= List of professional gardeners =

This is a list of people noted for their contribution to gardening, either by working as gardeners or garden designers, or by commissioning famous gardens.

It does not include the innumerable people who count gardening among their hobbies.

== Notable gardeners ==
The list follows gardeners or garden designers by occupation. It includes garden designers and landscape gardeners involved chiefly in garden design, and expert writers or broadcasters on the subject.

- John Abercrombie (1726–1806), Scottish horticulturalist and garden writer
- Ralph Austen (c. 1612–1676), English gardener and writer on gardening
- Chris Baines (born 1947), English horticulturalist and naturalist
- Luis Barragán (1902–1988), Mexican planner of public gardens
- William Barron (1805–1891), British landscape gardener and park designer
- Peter Beales (1936–2013), English rose grower
- Chris Beardshaw (born 1969), English garden designer, writer and broadcaster
- Beatrice Bligh (1916–1973), Australian gardener
- Knut Adolf Bovin (1853–1926), Swedish gardener, landscape architect, landscape gardener, publicist and writer on gardening
- Edward Augustus Bowles (1865–1954), English horticulturalist, plantsman and writer
- Lancelot "Capability" Brown (1716–1783), English landscape architect
- Toby Buckland (born 1969), English gardener, broadcaster and writer
- Stefan Buczacki (born 1945), English horticulturalist, botanist and broadcaster
- Edward Ashdown Bunyard (1878–1939), English apple breeder and market gardener
- Susan Campbell (1931–2024), English writer on kitchen gardens
- Percival Stephen Cane (1881–1976), English garden designer and writer
- George Frederick Carden (1798–1874), English developer of the garden cemetery movement and founder of Kensal Green Cemetery
- Alan Chadwick (1909–1980), English master gardener and organic farmer
- Beth Chatto (1926–2018), English creator of gardens at Elmstead Market showing gardening under extreme conditions
- Harold Basil Christian (1871–1950), South African/Rhodesian farmer, botanist and gardener
- Thomas Church (1902–1978), American landscape architect and pioneer of Modernist garden design
- Carolus Clusius (1526–1609), Flemish botanist and scientific horticulturist
- Marian Cruger Coffin (1876–1957), American landscape architect and garden designer
- Nigel Colborn (living), garden broadcaster
- Brenda Colvin (1897–1981), landscape architect and garden designer
- Herbert Cowley (1885–1967), botanist and garden writer
- Rachel De Thame (born 1961), English gardener and broadcaster
- Esther Deans, Australian pioneer of "no-dig gardening"
- Emily Dickinson (1830–1886), American botanist and gardener
- Charlie Dimmock (born 1966), English gardener and broadcaster
- Harry Dodson (1919–2005), English kitchen gardener
- David Domoney (born 1963), English garden broadcaster and horticulturist
- George Don (1798–1856), Scottish botanist
- Monty Don (born 1955), English garden broadcaster
- Andrew Jackson Downing (1815–1852), American landscape designer
- Henry Nicholson Ellacombe (1822–1916), English plantsman and garden writer
- Helena Rutherfurd Ely (1858–1920), American gardening author
- John Evelyn (1620–1706), English diarist, scholar and gardener
- Reginald Farrer (1880–1920), English plant collector and garden writer
- Jane Fearnley-Whittingstall (born 1939), English garden designer and landscape architect
- Xenia Field (1894–1998), English garden writer
- Ian Hamilton Finlay (1925–2006), Scottish artist and gardener
- Margery Fish (1892–1969), English cottage gardener and garden writer
- Bob Flowerdew (living), English organic gardener and broadcaster
- Alys Fowler (living), English gardener and broadcaster
- Robin Lane Fox (born 1946), English garden writer
- Robert Gathorne-Hardy (1902–1973), English garden writer
- Roy Genders (1913–1985), English garden writer
- Samuel Gilbert (died c. 1692), English writer on floriculture
- William Sawrey Gilpin (1761/1762–1843), English landscape designer
- Pippa Greenwood (living), English plant pathologist and broadcaster
- C. Z. Guest (1920–2003), New York Post gardening columnist
- Geoff Hamilton (1936–1996), English gardener, broadcaster and writer
- Ralph Hancock (1893–1950), Welsh landscape gardener and writer
- Joseph Harrison (1798–1856), English horticulturalist
- Robert Hart (1913–2000), English forest gardener
- Roy Hay (1910–1989), English horticulturalist and garden writer and broadcaster
- D. G. Hessayon (born 1928), English garden writer
- Shirley Hibberd (1825–1890), English garden writer
- Thomas Hill (born c. 1528), English garden writer
- Robert Hogg (1818–1897), Scottish nurseryman and botanist
- Percy Izzard (1877–1968), English garden writer
- Niki Jabbour (living), Canadian gardener and horticulturalist
- Gertrude Jekyll (1843–1932), English garden designer
- Geoffrey Jellicoe (1900–1996), English landscape architect and garden designer
- Susan Jellicoe (1907–1986), English plantswoman and garden writer
- George William Johnson (1802–1886), English garden writer
- William Kent (c. 1685–1748), English landscape architect
- Louisa Boyd Yeomans King (1863–1948), American gardener and author
- Antony King-Deacon (1941–2005), English gardening writer
- Noel Kingsbury (living), English garden designer and writer
- Carol Klein (born 1945), English gardener, writer and broadcaster
- Roy Lancaster (born 1937), English plantsman and writer
- Batty Langley (1696–1751), English garden designer and writer
- André Le Nôtre (1613–1700), French landscape architect
- Peter Joseph Lenné (1789–1866), Prussian landscape architect
- Arabella Lennox-Boyd (born 1938), Italian-born English garden designer
- Roddy Llewellyn (born 1947), English gardener and author
- Christopher Lloyd (1921–2006), English gardener and garden writer
- Claire Loewenfeld (1899–1974), German-born English herbalist
- Tony Lord (living), English gardener and garden writer
- Jane C. Loudon (1807–1858), English garden writer
- Mary McMurtrie (1902–2003), Scottish botanical artist and horticulturalist
- Patrick Neill (1776–1851), Scottish naturalist and horticulturalist
- Beverley Nichols (1898–1983), English author of gardening and other books
- J. C. U. Niedermann (1810–after 1865), American professional gardener in Wisconsin
- Frederick Law Olmsted (1822–1903), American designer and father of American landscape architecture
- Mirabel Osler (1925–2016), English garden designer and writer
- Piet Oudolf (born 1944) Dutch garden designer, nurseryman and writer
- Russell Page (1906–1985), English landscape architect
- Anna Pavord (born 1940), English gardening writer
- Eleanor Perenyi (1918–2009), American gardener and author
- Frances Perry (1907–1993), English gardener, writer and broadcaster
- Sarah Raven (born 1963), English gardener and broadcaster
- John Rea (died 1681), English nursery gardener and writer
- Humphrey Repton (1752–1818), English landscape designer
- William Robinson (1838–1935), Irish gardener/journalist prompting English cottage garden movement
- Katie Rushworth (born 1983), English gardening designer and broadcaster
- Anne Scott-James (1913–2009), English gardening writer
- Peter Seabrook (1935–2022), English garden writer and broadcaster
- Gay Search (living), English gardening broadcaster and writer
- Philip Morton Shand (1888–1960), English pomologist
- W. E. Shewell-Cooper (1900–1982), English no-dig, organic gardener
- George Sinclair (1787–1834), Scottish gardener
- Geoffrey Smith (1928–2009), English gardener and broadcaster
- Mary Spiller (1924–2019), English horticulturalist
- Fletcher Steele (1885–1971), American landscape architect and garden designer
- Andy Sturgeon (born 1965/1966), English garden designer and writer
- Joe Swift (born 1965), English garden designer and journalist
- Anne Swithinbank (born 1957), English horticulturalist and broadcaster
- Stephen Switzer (1682–1745), English garden designer and exponent of landscape gardening
- Patrick Synge (1910–1982), English botanist and plant hunter
- Colah B. Tawkin, American podcaster and gardener
- Christopher Thacker (1931–2018), English garden historian
- Theophrastus (c. 371–c. 287 BCE), Greek author of Enquiry into Plants and On the Causes of Plants
- Graham Stuart Thomas (1909–2003), English botanist and rose gardener
- Percy Thrower (1913–1988), English gardener and broadcaster
- Alan Titchmarsh (born 1949), English gardener and broadcaster
- John Tradescant the Elder (1570s–1638), English naturalist and gardener
- John Tradescant the younger (1608–1662), English botanist and gardener
- Inigo Triggs (1876–1923), English formal garden designer
- Roger Turner (living), English garden designer
- Rosemary Verey (1918–2001), English garden designer and writer
- Edna Walling (1896–1973), Australian garden designer, writer and photographer
- Rosamund Marriott Watson (1860–1911) English garden writer, The Heart of a Garden
- Edith Wharton (1862–1937), American novelist and landscape architect
- Thomas Whately (1726–1822), English landscape gardening writer
- Albert Wilson (1903–1996), American botanist, landscape architect, author and broadcaster
- Andrew Wilson (living), English garden designer
- Matthew Wilson (living), English garden designer and writer
- Frances Garnet Wolseley, 2nd Viscountess Wolseley (1872–1936), English garden writer and instructor
- Gabrielle van Zuylen (1933–2010), French gardener and garden writer

== People commissioning notable gardens ==
Other people whose primary profession was not gardening have made notable contributions to horticulture by planning or commissioning significant gardens.

- Michael Heseltine, 20th-century English politician, noted arboriculturist
- Thomas Jefferson, 19th-century American president, recognized for planning the grounds of the University of Virginia
- Lucullus, 1st-century BC Roman general, noted for laying out the Gardens of Lucullus
- Nebuchadnezzar II, 6th-century neo-Babylonian king, credited with founding the Hanging Gardens of Babylon
- Vita Sackville-West, English author, gardening columnist, creator of Sissinghurst Castle Garden in Kent
- William Shenstone, 18th-century English practitioner of landscape gardening through development of his estate
- Solomon, Biblical king recorded as creating gardens, possibly near Etam

== Fictional gardeners ==
- Agent 47, became a gardener in Sicily after he temporarily retired from being a hitman in Hitman 2: Silent Assassin
- Pat, the White Rabbit's gardener in Alice's Adventures in Wonderland
- Mr. McGregor, the elderly gardener in three children's books by Beatrix Potter: The Tale of Peter Rabbit, The Tale of Benjamin Bunny, and The Tale of the Flopsy Bunnies.
- Boothby, recurring character in Star Trek, groundskeeper of Starfleet Academy
- Chance the Gardener in the film Being There, a simple American whose name is misheard as "Chauncey Gardiner" and accidentally becomes a Presidential advisor and candidate
- Samwise Gamgee in The Lord of the Rings, a hobbit, the servant and companion of Frodo Baggins, the Ring-bearer
- Tom and Barbara Good in 1975 TV series The Good Life, a middle-class English couple who try to become self-sufficient on the produce of their garden in Surbiton
- Haru in the manga and anime "Beastars", a female rabbit who was the leader and only member of the gardening club at Cherryton Academy, and currently pursuing botany at University
- Souseiseki and Suiseiseki in the manga and anime Rozen Maiden, referred to as gardeners for their ability to tend not only plants but also the "soul trees" of humans
- The Chief Gardener of the Imperial Palace Grounds was a key figure on Trantor, the galactic capitol in Isaac Asimov's Foundation series – a high functionary with a palatial office in the enormous Imperial complex and "an army of men and women under him"
- There are multiple gardeners, botanists and herbologists in the Harry Potter series:
  - Pomona Sprout and Herbert Beery, Herbology teachers
  - Frank Bryce, the Riddles' gardener
  - Miranda Goshawk (in the film version) and Phyllida Spore, two authors
  - Elladora Ketteridge and Beaumont Majoribanks, discovered gillyweed, a fictional plant
  - Hadrian Whittle, named after a real-life garden designer
  - Rubeus Hagrid, gameskeeper, Keeper of Keys and Grounds at Hogwarts

== See also ==
- Celebrity gardener
- List of gardening topics
- List of landscape architects
