= Mark Lane (broadcaster) =

TV gardening presenter and designer

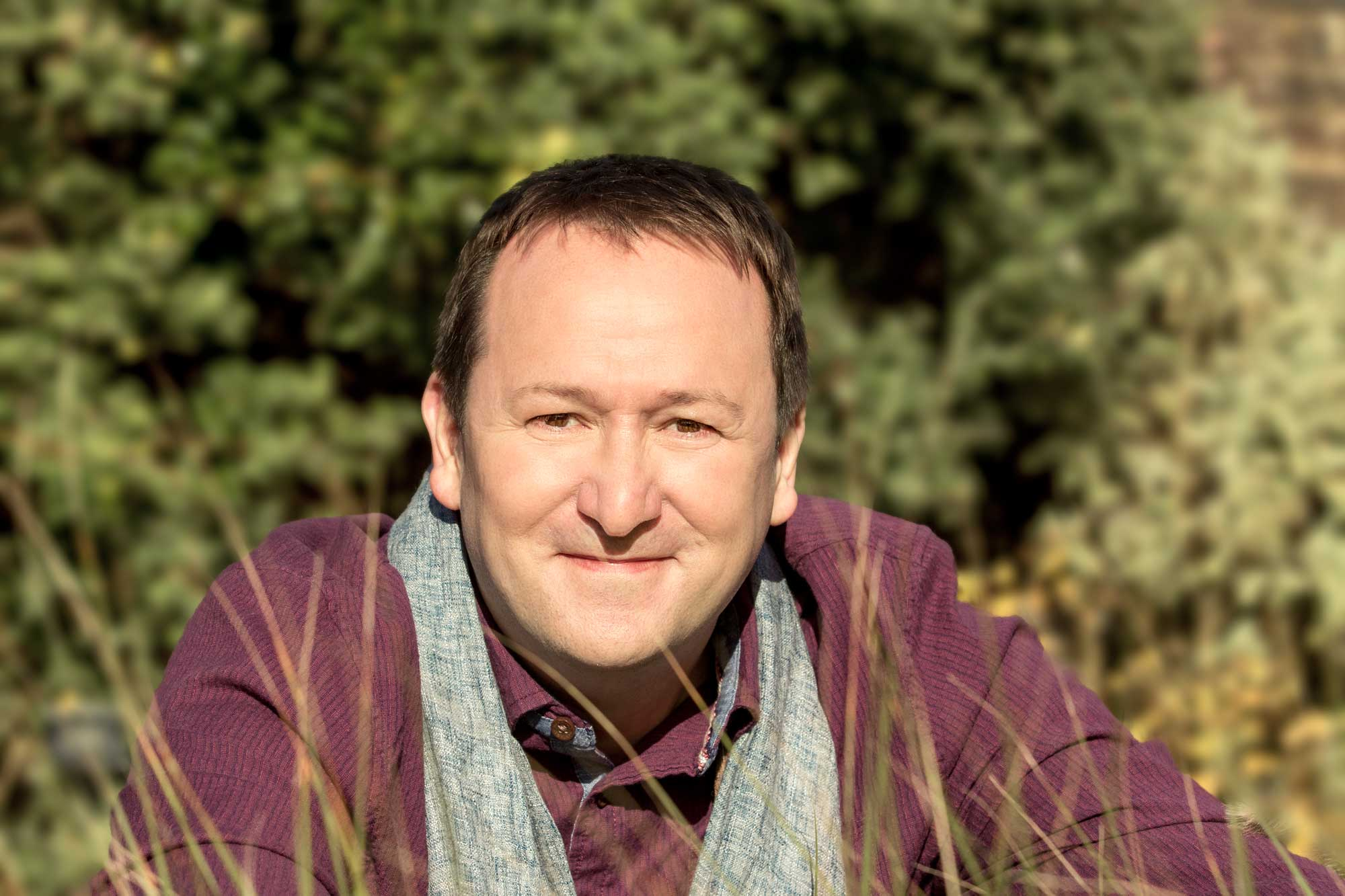
- Born: 27 October 1969 (age 56); Hertfordshire, England, UK
- Occupation(s): Broadcaster, gardener, journalist, author
- Spouse: Jasen John Cavalli

Mark Lane is a British television presenter, landscape designer, columnist, radio broadcaster and writer.

== Early life and education ==
Born in Hertfordshire in 1969 he is also a landscape designer, and the UK's first BBC gardening presenter who uses a wheelchair.

Lane was born with spina bifida and, in 2000, he had a car accident that led to operations on his spine. Lane uses a wheelchair full time.

After graduating from University College London in Art History, his career led him to work at the Royal Institute of British Architects (RIBA) where he eventually became the Publishing Director. After this, he moved to the Arts publisher Thames & Hudson as Managing Editor.

Lane's love for gardening led him to retrain as a garden designer via an Open Learning course.

Once Lane had retrained, he combined writing for newspapers and gardening magazines.

== TV work ==
Lane's break into TV presenting occurred after the BBC saw one of his articles and contacted him to see if he would be interested in presenting. He is now the only disabled presenter on Gardeners' World working alongside Monty Don, Carol Klein, Adam Frost, Jo Swift and Rachel de Thame, and he is the gardening expert on BBC Morning Live

Lane is a regular presenter at the Royal Horticultural Society (RHS) Flower Shows, namely RHS Chelsea Flower Show, RHS Hampton Court Garden Festival and RHS Tatton Flower Show. Lane is also working with the RHS and Morning Live to create a Feature Garden at Hampton Court Flower Show 2023.

Lane hosts his own 2-hour shows every week on QVC and QVC Style.

Lane appeared on BBC Celebrity Mastermind in 2018. His specialist subject was the Life and Works of Piet Mondrian. John Humphrys fielded the tricky questions. Joining Mark on the pre-Christmas ednetwor was broadcaster Reverend Richard Coles, BBC Media Editor Amol Rajan and Celebrity Big Brother winner Courtney Act. Mark raised £3,000 for the charity Leonard Cheshire.

Lane created the ITV ITV Ident for January 2021 with collage artist Sharon Walters

Lane was a finalist for 'Celebrity of the Year' in the National Diversity Awards 2021. Mark Lane Designs Ltd has also won numerous garden design awards in the UK and overseas and works closely with BALI, RHS and the BBC.

On 17 March, Lane appeared on BBC Comic Relief along with the rest of the BBC Morning Live presenter family to celebrate Gethin Jones's incredible BBC Strictly danceathon for Red Nose. An incredible £1.3 million was raised, the highest amount of any BBC fundraising event.

Lane was awarded an Honorary Doctorate from the University of Kent for his contribution to TV and garden design/horticulture.

In 2025, Lane appeared on BBC's Morning Live as part of their 'Grow Along' segment.

== Charity work ==
Lane is a patron of Core Arts, a Trustee for Gardening with Disabilities Trust, an Ambassador for Groundwork, Thrive, Greenfingers, Melanoma Fund, Leonard Cheshire and BALI.

Lane became a team leader of Disney Marvel Superhero Series in 2023, helping to create mass-participation sports events where people with disabilities do not need to worry about equipment restrictions.

Lane lives in Lincolnshire with his civil partner Jasen.

Lane's first book "Royal Gardens of the World" was published in 2020 by Kyle Books.

In January 2025, Lane was announced as an ambassador for the National Trust.
