= Katie Rushworth =

English television presenter and gardener

Katie Edwards
- Born: 9 May 1983 (age 42); Bradford
- Occupations: Gardener; Garden designer
- Known for: Love Your Garden (TV series)
- Spouse: Andrew Edwards
- Children: 2
- Website: www.katierushworth.com

Katie Louise Edwards (nee Rushworth; born 9 May 1983) is a garden designer, gardener and TV presenter from Bradford, West Yorkshire, England. In 2012, she successfully auditioned for a presenting role on the ITV television series, Love Your Garden as a co-presenter alongside Alan Titchmarsh, David Domoney and Frances Tophill. She has also been commissioned as a garden designer for many attractions and centres in Northern England, such as Airedale Hospital.

== Biography ==
Rushworth was born in Leeds and received her secondary education at Agnes Stewart High School in Burmantofts, before taking a part-time job in the fashion industry and then working full-time for Harvey Nichols in Leeds. After having her daughter, she decided upon a career change as she was travelling around with her job and it was not conducive to raising a child.

A friend asked Rushworth to help out with a bit of gardening and Rushworth found she really enjoyed it; so much so, that she enrolled on a horticultural course at Shipley College (the same college that her future co-presenter Alan Titchmarsh attended). Whilst she was on the course at Shipley College, she decided to go into garden design, which meant transferring to a degree course at Craven College (delivered by Bradford University). It was whilst she was at Craven College that a friend mentioned an e-mail asking for people to audition for Love Your Garden. She was among 90 people who applied for the role and the producers settled on Rushworth after interviews and a callback process.

In 2013, Rushworth was asked to turn on the lights at Bingley's Christmas festival (she was living in the town at the time) and in 2016, Rushworth released a book entitled Plants, Beds and Borders; Create and Maintain your Perfect Garden. In 2017, Rushworth teamed up with a garden centre in Tong to create a "people's garden" and became the designer for a garden outside the children's ward at Airedale Hospital in Steeton, West Yorkshire.

== Personal life ==
In 2008, Rushworth gave birth to a daughter at Airedale Hospital. Rushworth was born and brought up in Leeds, but whilst she was studying horticulture, she lived in Bingley, West Yorkshire. She now lives in Baildon and besides her own daughter, Polly, she has a step-daughter, Schyler, with her husband.
