= Marian Boswall =

British landscape architect

Marian Boswall FLI FSGD is a British landscape architect, garden designer, writer, and lecturer, known for her work in regenerative design, historic garden conservation, and large-scale private and public landscapes. She is the founding director of Marian Boswall Landscape Architects, based in Kent, England.

== Career ==
She trained in fine art and art history before studying landscape architecture at Greenwich University. She worked in business and international development before establishing her own practice in 2004.

Her studio has delivered projects across the United Kingdom, including country estates, historic landscapes, public gardens, and contemporary private gardens. She won the Society of Garden Designers’ Grand Award (2019) for a large residential garden project.

She is the author of Sustainable Garden: Projects, Insights and Advice for the Eco-Conscious Gardener (2022), which was shortlisted for the Garden Media Guild “Garden Book of the Year” award. She also writes columns on gardens and sustainability, for which she won “Garden Columnist of the Year” in 2019.

In 2025, she wrote The Kindest Garden: A Practical Guide to Regenerative Gardening.

Marian and Arit Anderson formed Sustainable Landscape Foundation in 2022. As of 2020, she is a Fellow of the Landscape Institute (FLI) and became a Fellow of the Society of Garden Designers (FSGD) in 2023
