= Gardening for the Million =

1904 book written for the English gardener by Alfred Pink

Gardening for the Million is a book written by Alfred Pink. It was written for the English gardener. It briefly describes the characteristics of 1252 different plants that are suitable for English gardens. The book was first published in London by Fisher Unwin in 1904 and is still available in both print and in electronic editions. Each of the plants is now described in a Wikipedia article.
