= Susan Kent =

Susan Kent may refer to:

- Susan Bertie, Countess of Kent (1554–?)
- Susan Kent (actress) (born 1975), Canadian actor and comedian
- Susan Kent (politician), member of the Minnesota Senate
- Sue Kent (born 1963), English gardening expert and garden designer
- Susan Kent, alter ego of the superhero Bulletgirl from Fawcett Comics
