= Capel Manor College =

Environmental school in Enfield, UK

Coordinates: 51.6799°N 0.0585°W

- Enfield, London; SE19 2BB; United Kingdom

Information
- Type: Further Education College
- Established: 1932
- Local authority: Enfield
- Category: Land-Based College
- Department for Education URN: 130438 Tables
- Ofsted: Reports
- Chair of Corporation: Joanne Roxburgh
- Principal and CEO: Peter Brammall
- Gender: Mixed
- Age range: 16-99
- Enrollment: c. 3,000
- Campuses: Crystal Palace Park, Enfield, Gunnersbury Park, Mottingham, Regent's Park
- Website: https://www.capel.ac.uk/

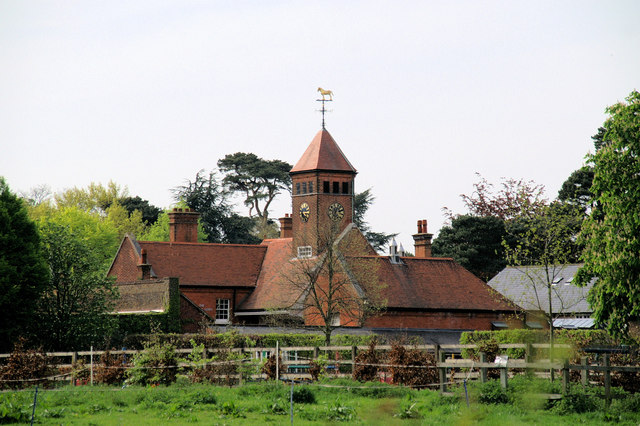
Capel Manor stable block. The weather vane depicts a Clydesdale horse.

Capel Manor College is a special environmental college located in Enfield, Greater London. The College has five campuses across the capital, Crystal Palace Park, Enfield, Gunnersbury Park, Mottingham and Regent's Park. It has a body of over 3,000 students. Peter Brammall is the current Principal of the College.

== History ==
In 1913 the Capel Manor estate in Enfield was privately owned by the Warren family, who were tea merchants, before being sold to Colonel Sydney Medcalf in 1932. Colonel Medcalf was passionate about horticulture and Clydesdale horses, and introduced soil steam sterilization to the Lea Valley Glasshouse industry. After the Colonel's death in 1958, parts of the estate were sold off and it became quite neglected.

However, it was Frances Perry, a local horticulturist, who succeeded with her vision of transforming the Capel Manor estate into a horticultural college with gardens open to the public. In 1968, the first 15 students started what was then called the Capel Manor Centre for Horticultural Education, and in the same year Perry became the first woman to be elected onto the Royal Horticultural Society Council.

Deborah Cavendish, Duchess of Devonshire became Patron of the College and Brigadier Andrew Parker Bowles became a trustee in 1985. Capel Manor College built its first garden at the RHS Chelsea Flower Show, ‘Garden for Everyone’, and won a Silver-Gilt medal. The College has continued to exhibit at the show, picking up several awards over the years. The College's Royal connections continued in 2000 when the new Duchess of Devonshire Pavilion at the College's Enfield Campus was opened by the Prince of Wales, and Queen Elizabeth II opened the Old Manor House Garden in 2010.

By 2013, Capel Manor College offered 65 courses across its campuses in subject areas such as, animal management, saddlery, horticulture, garden design, arboriculture and floristry.

The Royal Agricultural University became a partner and validating university for all degrees at the College in 2015.

2018 saw Capel Manor College celebrate its 50th anniversary and win Gold at the RHS Chelsea Flower Show and Gold at the Ideal Home Show, and in 2019 the College's students, apprentices and staff, designed and built the world's largest show garden at The Game Fair event held at Hatfield House.

== Curriculum ==
Students at the college tend the gardens as part of their programme of study. Courses include agriculture, animal management, horticulture, saddlery, arboriculture, floristry, wildlife and environmental conservation, and garden design.

== Facilities ==
The College's Enfield Campus is also home to Capel Manor Gardens, which features over 30 acres of 60 colourful gardens that are open to the public, along with the UK's only holly maze, a zoo, a florist (Manor Flowers) and a restaurant.

Forty Hall Farm is a certified organic farm in Enfield run by Capel Manor College, it is home to a variety of animals, including many rare breeds, and Greater London's only commercial vineyard, as well as a community orchard, market garden, farm shop and a certified organic veg bag scheme. Students can also study agriculture and horticulture here, gaining first-hand, practical experience as part of their learning.

Capel Manor College's Crystal Palace Park Campus is located within the National Sports Centre, serving as an education hub for environmental learning in South London. Students contribute to the welfare of the Park and its green areas, as well as care for the animals at Crystal Palace Park Farm. Similarly, the Gunnersbury Park Campus has working access to parts of Gunnersbury Park, enabling students the chance to gain practical experience in a real-world environment.

The Mottingham Campus in South East London has grounds that extend into woodland, where honey is harvested from bees and the animals are regularly exercised.

The Regent's Park Campus is located within the Inner Circle of Regent's Park, and the College works in partnership with The Royal Parks to increase the options for horticulture and garden design training for people living and working in inner London.

== Notable alumni ==
- Arit Anderson
- Kim Wilde

== See also ==
- List of universities and higher education colleges in London

== Sources ==
Capel Vine, Friends of Capel Manor, issue 4, 1997
