= Nick Macer =

English nurseryman

Nick Macer from Stroud is best known as a specialist nurseryman and owner of Pan Global Plants, Gloucestershire, UK, but also as a presenter on BBC's regular gardening show, Gardeners World, where he looked at gardens specializing in hardy exotics during the autumn of 2016.

After, in his own words, a 'rebellious youth', he took a three-year course in arboriculture at Merrist Wood College. Then with a bank loan he started Pan-global Plants in 1997, now based in Frampton-on-Severn. He has travelled the world to find plants for his unique nursery which supplies plants to many significant gardens throughout the UK including the RHS, National Trust and Buckingham Palace.
