= Advolly Richmond =

British garden writer and historian (born 1966)

- Born: August 1966 (age 60)
- Education: University of Bristol
- Occupations: Historian, gardener, television presenter
- Website: Official website

Advolly Xotshiwe Taylor Richmond OBE (born August 1966) is a garden writer, historian and a television presenter, who regularly appears on BBC Gardener's World.

== Career ==
Richmond formerly worked in the automobile industry, before choosing to retrain in horticulture. She is a graduate of the Work and Retrain As a Gardener Scheme (WRAG) which was developed by the Women's Farm and Garden Association. After completing her traineeship, she studied for and was awarded an MA in Garden History from the University of Bristol. She also studied for the Royal Horticultural Society Certificate in Horticulture, prior to her WRAG role.

Richmond is a presenter on BBC Gardener's World, where she presents regular sections on garden history. She has worked on the life of Reverend Thomas Birch Freeman and his influence on horticulture in the nineteenth century. She has also worked on the gardens of Capability Brown, the Botanic Garden in Harare and nineteenth-century African botanical stations. She has spoken out about her experiences of racism in horticulture.

== Eponym ==
Richmond has a variety of snowdrop named after her.

== Awards ==
- Alan Titchmarsh New Talent Award (finalist) - Garden Media Guild Awards 2020.
- Officer of the Order of the British Empire (OBE) - New Years Honours List 2026.
