= British Thyroid Foundation =

British health charity

- Abbreviation: BTF
- Formation: 1991
- Legal status: Charity
- Headquarters: Suite 12, One Sceptre House, Hornbeam Square North, Harrogate, HG2 8BP
- Region served: UK
- Affiliations: British Thyroid Association
- Staff: 6
- Volunteers: 20
- Website: BTF

The British Thyroid Foundation (BTF) is a UK-based, patient-led, registered charity dedicated to supporting people with thyroid disorders and helping their families and people around them to understand the condition.

== Function ==
The British Thyroid Foundation is a patient support organisation. The aims of the BTF are to help improve understanding of thyroid disease; represent the patient perspective to medical professionals; offer a peer support network and fund research into thyroid function and thyroid disease to improve patient outcomes.

The BTF is recognised by the British Thyroid Association, the British Association of Endocrine and Thyroid Surgeons, the British Society for Paediatric Endocrinology and Diabetes, and the Society for Endocrinology as a helpful resource. It is also listed as a carer centre and service by National Health Service (NHS) England.

== History ==
The British Thyroid Foundation was founded in 1991 by Janis Hickey MBE after she was diagnosed with Graves and thyroid eye disease. With the encouragement of Sir Richard Bayliss KCVO, who was involved with the British Thyroid Association, the BTF was set up as a registered charity based in Harrogate, North Yorkshire, UK. Past and present patrons include, Clare Balding, Jenny Pitman and Gay Search.

== Activities ==
The British Thyroid Foundation provides a support network to thyroid patients through its local support groups, volunteer telephone contacts and closed Facebook groups, run by people with thyroid disease. The BTF offers a medical query answering service. BTF News is the regular member newsletter featuring articles about thyroid research and treatment, patient stories and local group activities.

== Campaigns ==
The Cancer Project of the BTF has a goal to provide information, support and help to thyroid cancer patients and to help improve treatment and care in collaboration with medical professionals and other cancer groups. The Children's Project aims to help parents and carers find information and support about their children's condition, the BTF produces resources and holds regular information events for families. The Thyroid in Pregnancy program aims to educate patients, medical professionals and the general public with current research-based information about thyroid disease in pregnancy. In 2018 the ‘BTF Thyroid disorders and pregnancy' information prescription tools were adopted by EMIS Health. Originally developed by Anh Tran, the tools aim to help patients and clinicians better understand the importance of managing thyroid function during conception and pregnancy.
