= The Alan Titchmarsh Show =

2007–2014 British talk TV series

- The show's final titlecard used from 2013–14
- Genre: Entertainment
- Directed by: Dino Charalambous
- Presented by: Alan Titchmarsh
- Country of origin: United Kingdom
- No. of series: 15
- No. of episodes: 790 (including special episodes)

Production
- Executive producers: Annie Sweetbaum; Matt Young
- Producer: Phil McCullough
- Production locations: The London Studios (2011–2014); Television Centre (2007–2010)
- Running time: 60 minutes (inc. adverts)
- Production company: Spun Gold TV

Original release
- Network: ITV
- Release: 3 September 2007 – 14 November 2014

Related
- The Michael Ball Show (2010)

The Alan Titchmarsh Show is a British daytime chat show presented by Alan Titchmarsh. It was first broadcast on ITV on 3 September 2007 until 14 November 2014 and aired on weekday afternoons. The show's main focus is the "Best of British" theme with many of the shows' segments focusing on fashion, health, nature, cookery and animals.

On 18 March 2014, Titchmarsh announced that he was leaving the show. The last episode aired on 14 November 2014.

== Format ==
The show's original logo used from 2007–12

The programme made its debut on ITV in 2007. It focused on the theme of "The Best of British" focusing on food, entertainment and celebrities in a mid-afternoon slot. The focus of the show later shifted towards gossip, entertainment and a light-hearted discussion of sex tips. The latter was dropped after viewer complaints and a shift to a late afternoon 5 pm slot in 2010.

The show usually opened with a review of gossip and current affairs stories of the day with regular guests including Gloria Hunniford, Carole Malone, Penny Smith, Nick Ferrari, Janet Street-Porter, Jane McDonald and Emma Forbes offering their opinions. The programme resumed the studio debate format at half-past the hour with a "heated" discussion on the main "hot topic" of the day. The programme also included regular cookery slots with Nadia Sawalha or Claire Richards with Titchmarsh adopting a comical, "hands-on" role as a hopeless cookery assistant. In Shrager's cookery demonstrations, the pair alternated between bickering and flirting with visual "humour" and numerous double entendres from the host. A wine-tasting panel often featured along with items on flower-arranging, pets and gardening, the latter involving Titchmarsh answering viewer's horticultural questions assisted by studio guests. The show usually concluded with Titchmarsh interviewing a major celebrity or public figure and also contained regular musical items with live studio performances. The show was coloured with Titchmarsh's dry, slightly camp style and Yorkshire wit and was often peppered with risque puns of a mildly sexual nature.

In March 2011, the show returned to its traditional daytime TV mid-afternoon slot for its eighth series between 3-4pm after a spell in the "primetime" 5pm slot for a 10-week run. The programme celebrated its 400th edition on 9 March 2011. The show returned to ITV daytime on 5 September 2011, with a return to its original opening 'starry' titles and theme music. The latest series stars David Domoney as one of the expert gardeners.

The show was produced at The London Studios by Spun Gold TV. It is aired Monday to Friday with some editions broadcast live and other editions pre-recorded. Previous series were broadcast from BBC Television Centre.

=== 2013 revamp ===
The 2013 series, which began on Monday 21 January 2013, saw several changes to the show. Firstly the show's logo was replaced by a much more up-to-date and modern one. The former theme tune stayed the same but with a slower, fresher take on it. Several minor changes were made to the studio set. Many stars became regulars on the show, such as Coleen Nolan, Myleene Klass and Lisa Riley. Riley became a full regular on Monday's with up to date gadgets and ways to keep fit.

== Former features ==
=== Singing contest ===
The show returned for a third series at the start of September 2008. It launched a competition to find a soprano to sing alongside Jonathan Ansell in the A Night at the Opera tour. From the thousands of hopefuls who applied, eight ladies were selected to sing in front of a judging panel of David Grant, Ruthie Henshall and Jonathan Shalit. The four successful ladies – Rosie Bell, Rosie Havel, Olivia Safe and Esther Dee – faced a public vote on 15 September 2008 and Olivia Safe and Rosie Bell won through. They both sang with Jonathan Ansell Libiamo ne' lieti calici, the most famous duet from Verdi's La Traviata on 29 September 2008 and Olivia Safe won the public vote to appear in the tour of A Night at the Opera during October and November 2008.

== Presenters, experts and guests ==
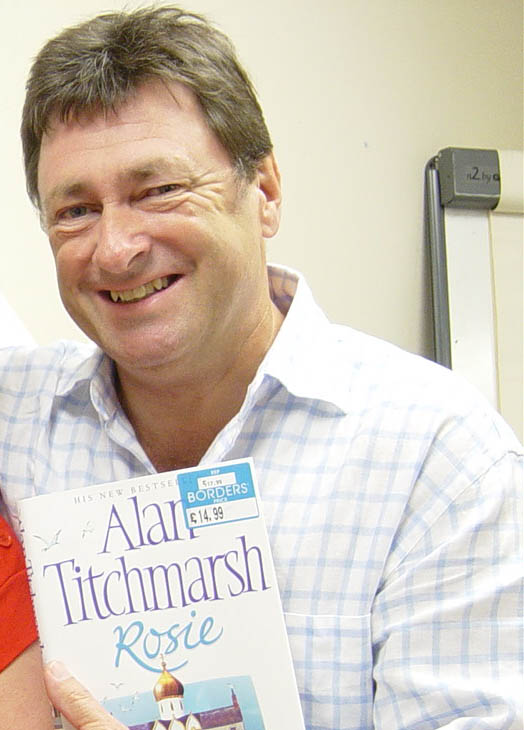
Alan Titchmarsh, the presenter of the show

Although the show is primarily presented by Alan Titchmarsh, presenters such as Myleene Klass and Claire Richards present segments such as fashion and cookery.

Tenure	Name	Title
2007–2014	Alan Titchmarsh	Main presenter
2010–12	Rosemary Shrager	Chef
2010–11	Ainsley Harriott	Chef
2011–12	David Domoney	Gardener
2012–13	Ellie Harrison	Nature Expert
2013–14	Myleene Klass	Fashion Expert
2013–14	Nadia Sawalha	Chef
2013–14	Claire Richards	Baker
2013–14	Lisa Riley	Regular Expert
2013–14	Dr Dirk Kremer	Doctor
2013–14	Coleen Nolan	Agony Aunt

== Transmissions ==
=== Main series ===
Series	Episodes	Premiere	Finale
1	40	3 September 2007	26 October 2007
2	50	14 January 2008	21 March 2008
3	50	1 September 2008	7 November 2008
4	64	12 January 2009	9 April 2009
5	60	28 September 2009	18 December 2009
6	61	11 January 2010	5 April 2010
7	60	27 September 2010	17 December 2010
8	49	7 March 2011	13 May 2011
9	50	5 September 2011	11 November 2011
10	50	16 January 2012	23 March 2012
11	50	3 September 2012	9 November 2012
12	50	21 January 2013	29 March 2013
13	50	9 September 2013	15 November 2013
14	50	20 January 2014	28 March 2014
15	50	8 September 2014	14 November 2014

=== Christmas editions ===
Series	Episodes	Premiere	Finale
1	5	17 December 2007	21 December 2007
Special	1	21 December 2008	

=== Broadcast on STV ===
STV, serving central and northern Scotland ITV regions, decided not to broadcast series' 3 to 7. STV wished to broadcast their afternoon chat show The Hour instead at 5 pm. STV also believe the show did not rate well and thus has an opt-out, but it became clear the series was partly axed to a dispute with ITV. In 2011, the dispute was resolved and STV began broadcasting the eighth series in March 2011, the same as the other ITV regions. During the period viewers had to use other means to watch the series including ITV Player or watch the show on ITV's London feed, on Sky or Virgin Media.

== Controversies ==
The programme's discussion of "adult" themes, including a former regular item on sex toys presented by Julie Peasgood have sparked a large number of viewer complaints. In 2010, Ofcom, the media regulator, released figures revealing that Titchmarsh's ITV show had the fifth highest number of complaints of any programme for that year.

In 2013, Ofcom ruled that an interview with actress Patsy Kensit breached regulations. Kensit was found to have made "promotional and unduly prominent" references to diet firm Weight Watchers, which she is paid to endorse, and Titchmarsh had failed to challenge her claims or mention that Kensit was a "weight loss ambassador" for the diet company.

== The Michael Ball Show ==
From 16 August to 24 September 2010, actor Michael Ball presented his own chat show also produced by Spun Gold TV which followed a very similar format to The Alan Titchmarsh Show during the latter's summer break. It ran for 30 editions over 6 weeks and was aired 3 to 4 pm and recorded at BBC Television Centre.
