= Sue Kent =

English gardening expert and TV presenter

- Born: Reading, England
- Occupations: Garden expert, garden designer, television presenter, speaker
- Employer: BBC
- Known for: Television gardening programmes
- Television: Gardeners' World, Garden Rescue, Chelsea Flower Show

Susan Kent (born 1963) is an English gardening expert and garden designer, who also works as a television presenter. She is best known for her work on BBC Two's Gardeners' World and Garden Rescue programmes.

== Early life and education ==
Born in Reading, England, Kent attended St Joseph's School from 1966 to 1977. She later attended King James College, in Henley, and studied marketing and advertising at the University of the West of England (UWE). Kent later gained a sports massage qualification at the University of Wales Institute, Cardiff (Uwic).

Kent was born with an upper limb disability called phocomelia caused by the drug Thalidomide, she has 8 in (20 cm) arms and seven fingers.

== Career ==
=== Television and shows ===
Kent made her television debut on Gardeners' World in 2020 after sending a home video in of her own garden. It was such a hit that she became a regular presenter on the show, winning a Garden Media Award for her efforts. Her appearance on television has shown how gardening can be accessible to those with disabilities.

In July 2022 Kent received a Silver Gilt medal and The People's Choice award at RHS Hampton Court Garden Festival for her garden.

In 2023, Kent created a Platinum Award Winning Border at BBC Gardener's World Live.

Kent is a Royal Horticultural Society ambassador for disability inclusion.

In 2025, Kent was part of the main daytime BBC One Chelsea Flower Show presenting team. Kent joined the new presenting line-up for BBC's Garden Rescue programme, due to be broadcast later in the year.

=== Writing ===
Kent has written her own book, called 'Garden Notes'. She often writes for gardening publications such as BBC Gardeners' World magazine and produces videos for the magazine's YouTube channel and podcast for Spotify.

=== Other work ===
Kent has previously worked as a sports massage therapist, using her feet.

== Personal life ==
Kent is married to chartered accountant Stephen Kent. The pair share two children.

She has Ménière’s disease which has caused her symptoms such as deafness, blindness and vertigo.

== Bibliography ==
- Sue Kent, Garden Notes ISBN 9781802585889
