= Joseph Harrison (horticulturalist) =

English horticulturist (1798–1856)

- Born: 1798; Sheffield, West Riding of Yorkshire, England
- Died: 16 May 1856 (aged 57–58); Plumstead, Kent
- Burial place: St Nicholas's Church, Plumstead
- Occupations: gardener; nurseryman; magazine editor
- Known for: The Horticultural Register; The Floricultural Cabinet; The Garden Almanack
- Parents: Charles Harrison (father); Ann Harrison, née Coe (mother)

Joseph Harrison (1798 – 16 May 1856) was a British horticulturalist and editor of horticultural periodicals.

== Life ==
Harrison was born in Sheffield in 1798, the first child of nine born to Charles Harrison and Ann, née Coe. The elder Harrison was from 1805 head gardener at Wortley Hall, the seat of James Stuart-Wortley-Mackenzie, and then, from 1818, of James Stuart-Wortley, 1st Baron Wharncliffe. Joseph took over the position in 1828 when his father moved to the estate of George Wyndham, 3rd Earl of Egremont, at Petworth House. Harrison married Ann Louise Weightman on 21 August 1818 at St. Peter's Church in Tankersley.

In 1830, with Richard Gill Curtis, he filed a patent relating to the glazing of greenhouses. He left his job at Wortley Hall in 1837, and moved to Downham, in Norfolk, where he set up as a florist. He later moved to Richmond in Surrey. He died in Plumstead, then in Kent, on 16 May 1856.

== Publications ==
Harrison edited the Horticultural Register, a digest and review of other publications, with Joseph Paxton in 1831. In 1833 he launched a low-priced monthly magazine, the Floricultural Cabinet, which was successful; it sold almost 60,000 copies in its first nine months. In 1859, after his death, his sons made it a weekly and renamed it the Gardener's Weekly Magazine and Floricultural Cabinet. They sold it in 1861, and – as The Gardener's Weekly – it remained in print until 1916. Harrison also edited The Gardener's and Forester's Record, with practical gardening advice, and also, from 1852, The Garden Almanack.
