= Chris Beardshaw =

British gardener (born 1969)

Christopher Paul Beardshaw (born 11 January 1969) is a British garden designer, plantsman, author, speaker, and broadcaster.

== Background ==
Beardshaw was born and grew up in Broad Green, near Broadwas, Worcestershire. He was formally trained in horticulture at Pershore College, and holds a BA Hons and PGDip in landscape architecture from the University of Gloucestershire. He has won 35 prestigious design awards, including 12 RHS Gold Medals. He has also been voted for the People's Choice Award six times, most recently in 2023.

His first TV appearance was in 1999 as the expert on Surprise Gardeners for Carlton TV. After this, he moved to the BBC TV and Real Rakeovers as the expert contributor. His first show as solo presenter was Weekend Gardener for UKTV Style in 2000. Also in 2000, he co-presented Gardening Neighbours for BBC 2. This was followed by three series of Housecall. After this, he joined Gardeners' World Live as a specialist presenter, and then soon moved on to become a presenter on Gardeners' World. Beardshaw presented The Flying Gardener series for BBC2, which ran for four series. He currently presents Beechgrove and is a regular panel member on BBC Radio 4's Gardeners' Question Time.

The Chris Beardshaw Rose was launched at the Hampton Court Flower Show in July 2007. Scented with soft pink blooms, the new rose was produced by international rose specialist C&K Jones. Chris Beardshaw specifically asked for a donation (£2.50) to be made to the Royal National Lifeboat Institution (RNLI) for every rose sold.

He holds an Honorary Degree from Liverpool University and is an Honorary Fellow of Gloucestershire University, and in 2017 was awarded the Kew Guild Gold Award.
