= Frances Tophill =

British horticulturalist and television presenter

- Born: Deal, Kent
- Education: Scotland's Rural College
- Occupations: Gardener, conservationist, sustainability campaigner, television presenter and gardening writer
- Known for: Appearances on Love Your Garden and Gardeners' World

Frances Tophill is a British horticulturist, author, and television presenter known for her contributions to Love Your Garden and Gardeners' World. She has written eight books.

== Early life ==
Tophill was born in Deal, Kent, and is one of three sisters. She did a BTEC in jewellery design, but was not interested in jewellery, and, aged 19, decided she wanted to be a gardener. She did an apprenticeship at the garden at The Salutation, Sandwich. She went on to a degree in horticulture with plantsmanship from the Scottish Agricultural College and Royal Botanic Garden Edinburgh, finishing in 2013.

== Career ==
In 2011, Tophill auditioned as a presenter on ITV's Love Your Garden, and was successful. In 2016, she became a presenter on the BBC's Gardeners' World.

In June 2022, her first show-garden won a platinum medal and best in show at Gardeners' World Live at the NEC in Birmingham. It showed a post-apocalyptic garden.

Her book, The Modern Gardener: A practical guide for creating a beautiful and creative garden (Octopus Publishing, 2022), has been described as containing a "passionate, environmental debate" about gardening and gardeners.

Tophill works with the Royal Horticultural Society's Campaign for School Gardening to promote gardening to young people.

She is a regular panellist on BBC Radio 4's Gardeners' Question Time.

== Personal life ==
Tophill lives in Devon. She is a quilter and amateur ceramicist.

== Books ==
- The First-Time Gardener. Kyle Books, 2015
- The Container Gardener. Kyle Books, 2017, ISBN 978-0857833808
- Container Gardener's Handbook. Companion House Books, 2018, ISBN 978-0857832542
- Rewild Your Garden: Create a haven for birds, bees, and butterflies. Quercus Books, 2020, ISBN 978-1529410259
- The Modern Gardener: A practical guide for creating a beautiful and creative garden. Octopus Publishing, 2022, ISBN 978-0857839435
- A Year in a Small Garden: Creating a Beautiful Garden in Any Space. BBC Books - Ebury Publishing, 2024, ISBN 9781785948640
