= Gardeners' World Live =

British gardening exhibition

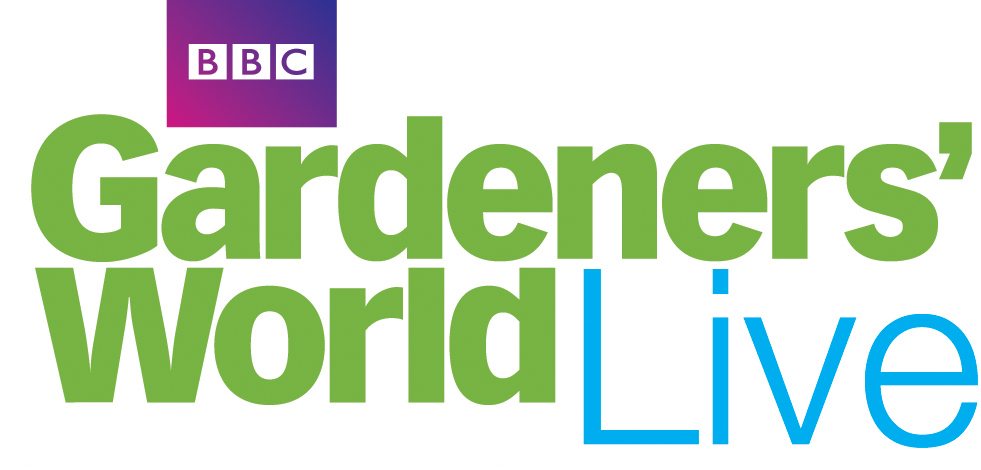
- Status: Active
- Genre: Gardening
- Venue: National Exhibition Centre
- Location: Birmingham
- Country: UK
- Inaugurated: 1991
- Attendance: 101,005
- Organizer: River Street Events Ltd
- Website: www.bbcgardenersworldlive.com

BBC Gardeners' World Live is a large multi-day gardening related consumer show held each June at the National Exhibition Centre, England, co-located with the Good Food Show Summer. Open to the general public, the BBC television programme endorsed event typically hosts celebrity focus groups and advice workshops, showcases new product announcements, show gardens, floral marquee, along with providing retail space to exhibiting parties. Exhibitors have included Thompson & Morgan, Makita tools and many more.

== History ==
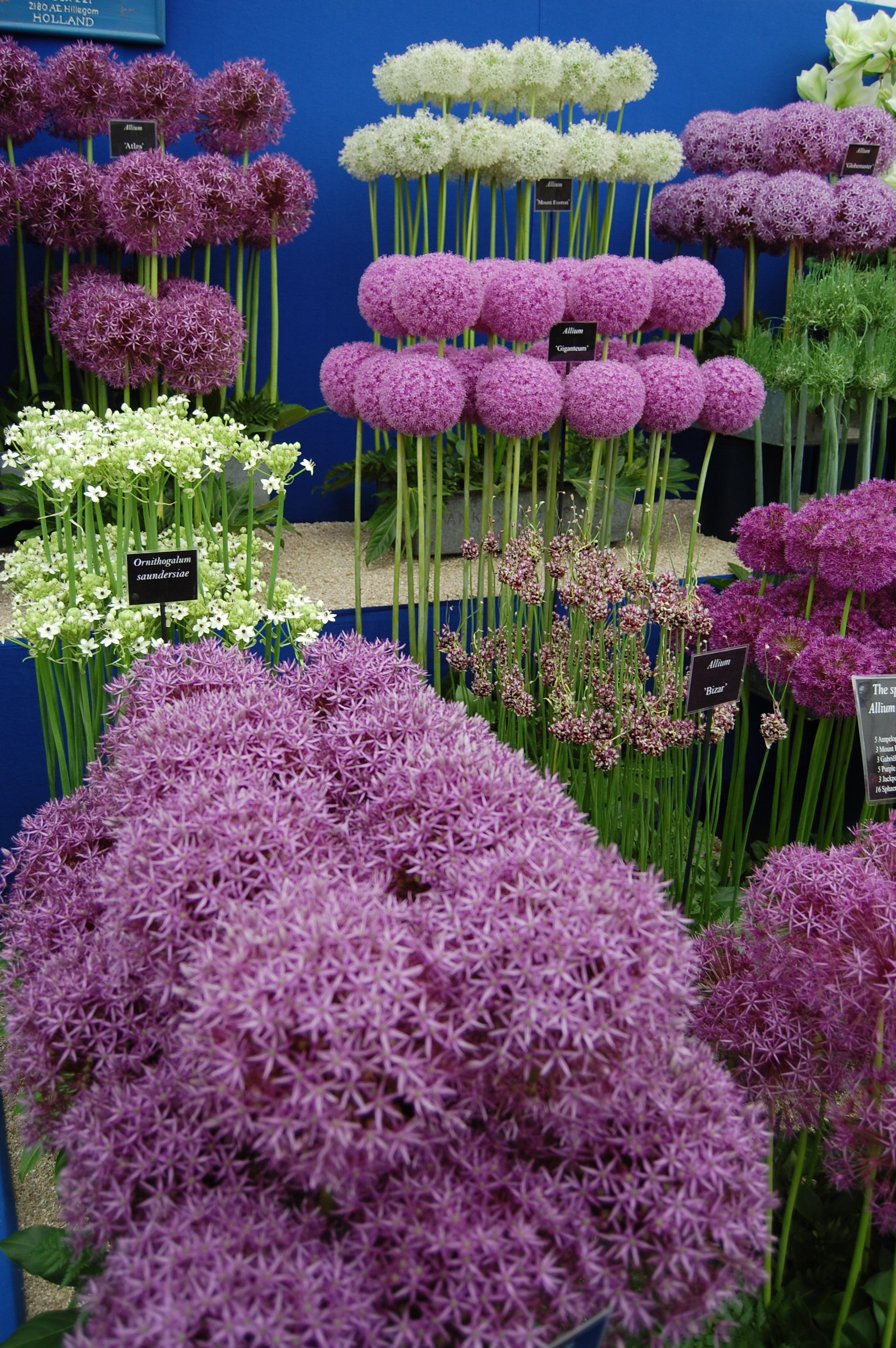
Selection of cultivated Alliums displayed at the 2011 show.

The first Gardeners' World Live was held in June 1992. It was a spinoff from the BBC Gardeners' World television series. The event had 17,500 attendees and over 100 exhibitors. Since 2005 Gardeners' World Live has been co-located with the Good Food Show Summer. Until 2015, Gardeners' World Live included the Royal Horticultural Society Flower Show Birmingham, but after the 2015 the two parted ways. BBC Gardeners' World Live continues to be one of the country's leading gardening events.

Since 2021, the Gardeners' World Spring Fair has been held every April or May at Beaulieu Motor Museum in Hampshire. Since 2022, the Gardeners' World Autumn Fair has been held every September at Audley End House in Essex.

== Recent years ==
The show attracts an audience of between 90,000 and 100,000 annually. The Audit Bureau of Circulations confirmed the 2010 show's attendance at 101,005. With 564 participating companies between 16–20 June 2010. In celebration of her 60th birthday formal model and socialite Twiggy was the honorary recipient of a named rose. Tickets are sold via the NEC's box office, The Ticket Factory. In 2017 the event celebrated 50 years of BBC Two's Gardeners' World.

=== Show highlights ===
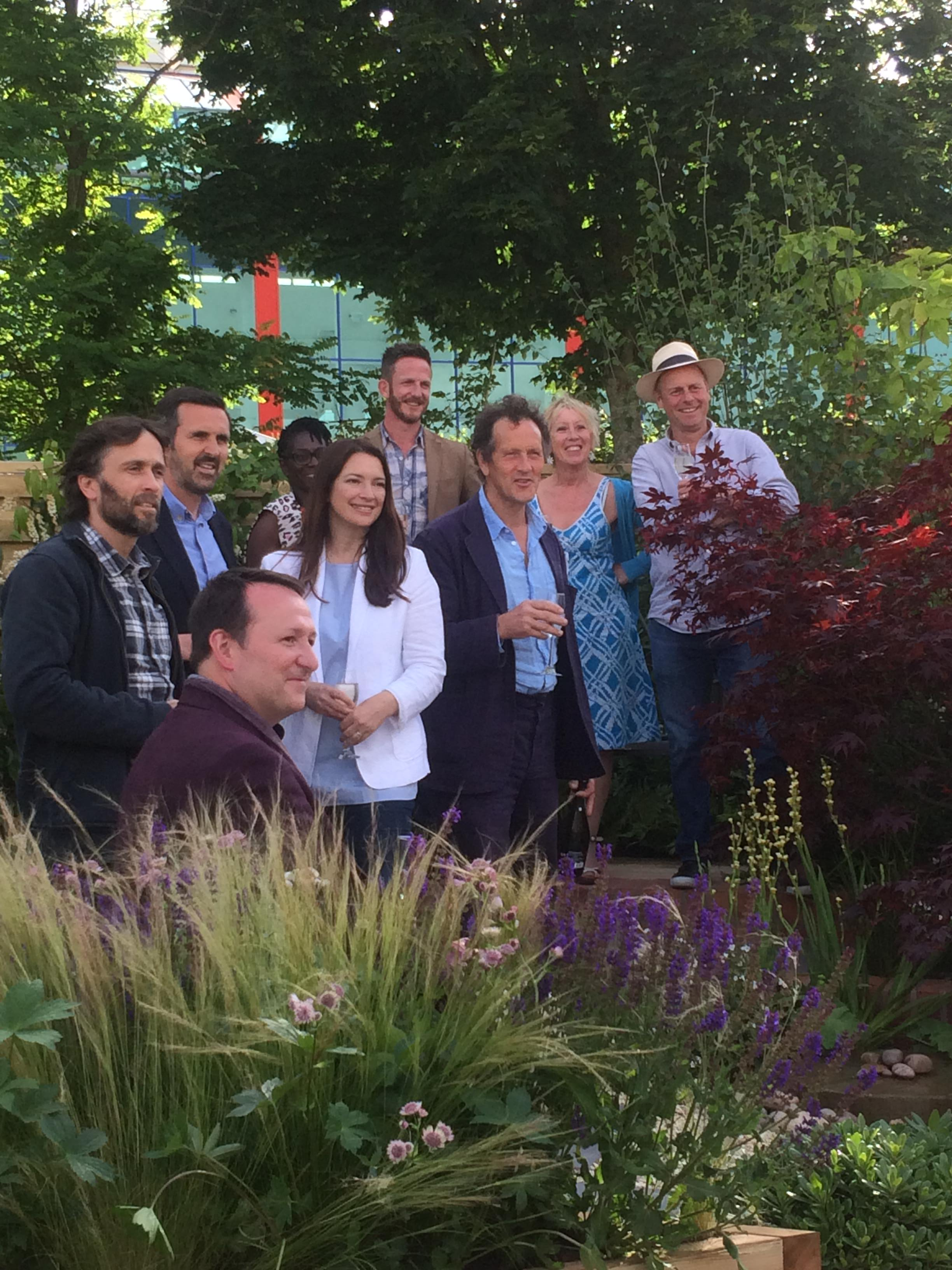
The presenters of BBC Two's Gardeners' World filmed from the event for their 1-hour anniversary special, which aired on Friday 17 June 2017.

The 2017 Show included features celebrating the 50th anniversary of BBC Two's Gardeners' World including The Nostalgia Garden set in the 60s (designed by Paul Stone), and The Anniversary Garden showing vignettes of how the garden design styles have developed over the decades (designed by Professor David Stevens). The BBC Two production team filmed at the event on Wednesday (before opening to the public) and Thursday, with the resulting 1-hour anniversary TV special airing on Friday 17 June. Best in Show was won by Wyevale Garden Centres for their 'Romance in the Ruins' garden designed by Claudia de Yong.

In 2016 the show includes Floral Marquee, Show Gardens and BBC Gardeners' World Live Theatre where the TV presenters shared their inspiration live on stage, along with Alan Titchmarsh on Friday.

In 2013 the show included the Royal Horticultural Society Floral Marquee, BBC Gardeners' World Theatre, The Kitchen Garden Stage, The Design Clinic, Gardening for Wildlife and Show Gardens. For the first time the outside area was brought together under the banner Royal Horticultural Society Flower Show Birmingham. Celebrity and expert gardeners included Monty Don, Carol Klein, Joe Swift, Diarmuid Gavin, Cleve West, Toby Buckland, Anne Swithinbank, Matt Biggs and David Domoney.

In previous years the shows featured the Gardeners' World Magazine Theatre, award winning show gardens, grow your own garden, Floral Marquee and Floristry Master-classes.

Celebrity guests are commonplace with familiar names such as Toby Buckland, Monty Don, Joe Swift, John Craven, Julia Bradbury, James Martin, Ainsley Harriott and the Hairy Bikers.

Each year prizes for best gardens are bestowed upon exhibitors by visiting celebrities attracting large media attention.

Rose Dedications - every year a new breed of rose is specifically dedicated and named after a leading public figure. Previous recipients include Phillip Schofield, Barbara Windsor and Twiggy. In 2017 the new rose 'Gardeners' Gold' was launched.

Sponsors

In recent years, sponsors involved in the Show include

- Lexus: Headline sponsors in 2014, 2015, 2016, 2017
- Wyevale Garden Centres: sponsors in 2015, 2016, 2017
- GreenThumb; Floral Marquee sponsors in 2016
- Honda
- Thompson & Morgan

=== Show Dates ===
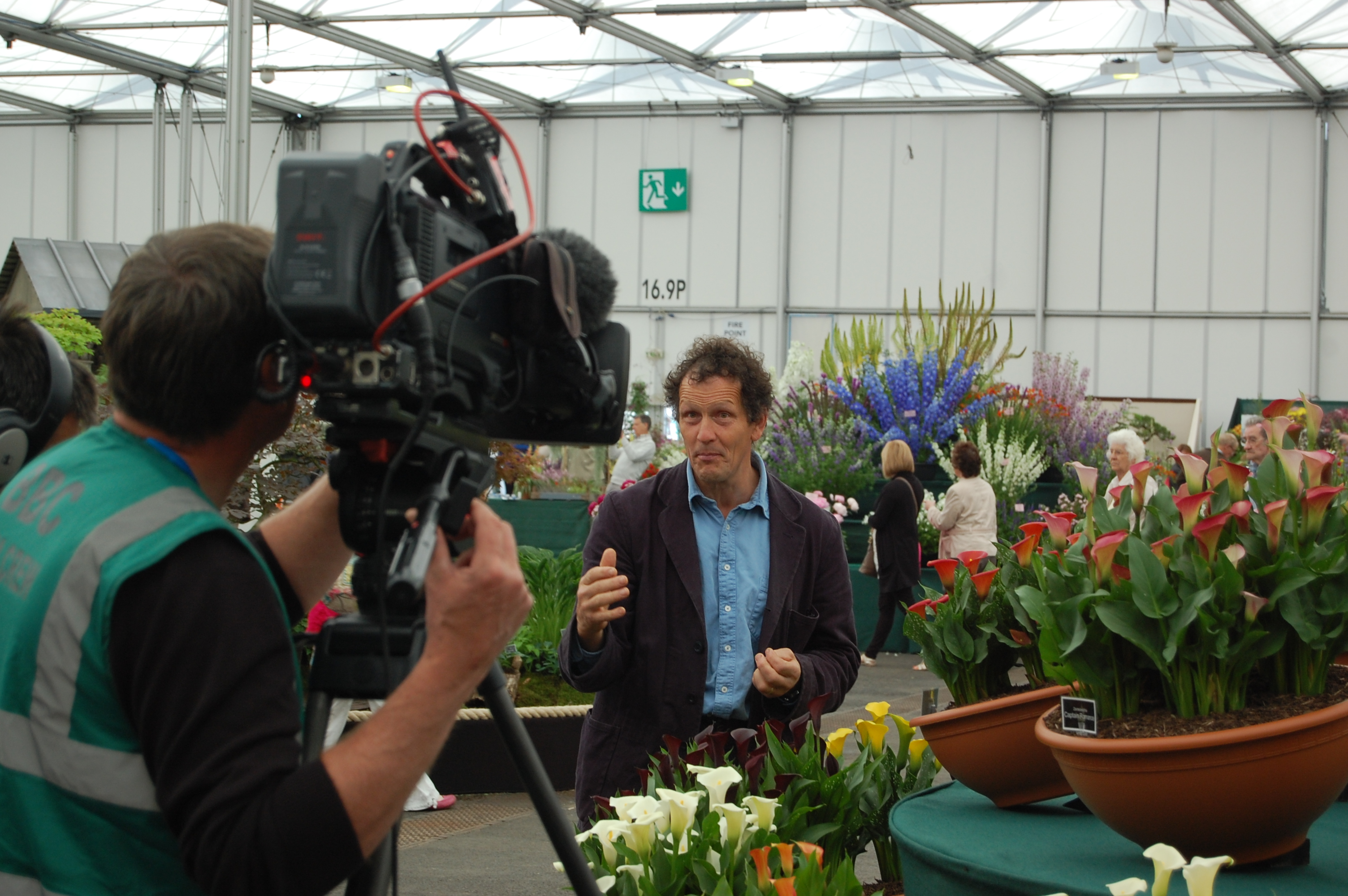
Monty Don records a piece to camera, for the television programme BBC Gardeners' World, at Gardeners' World Live 2012

- 14–18 June 2006
- 16–20 June 2007
- 11–15 June 2008
- 10–14 June 2009
- 16–20 June 2010
- 15–19 June 2011
- 13–17 June 2012
- 12–16 June 2013
- 12–15 June 2014
- 11–14 June 2015
- 16–19 June 2016
- 15–18 June 2017
- 14–17 June 2018
- 13–16 June 2019
- The 2020 show was cancelled due to the COVID-19 pandemic
- The 2021 show was held later in the year, from 26-29 August, due to COVID-19 restrictions
- 16-19 June 2022
- 15-18 June 2023
- 13-16 June 2024

== See also ==
- Royal Horticultural Society
- Chelsea Flower Show
- Tatton Park Flower Show
