= Arit Anderson =

British garden designer

Arit Anderson is a British garden designer, writer, and television presenter. She has presented on the BBC show Gardeners World and the BBC One show Garden Rescue.

== Biography ==
Anderson was born in London and raised in Hertfordshire by a single mother in a home with six siblings, five of whom were in foster care. After first pursuing a career as a pharmacy technician, she worked in the fashion industry for about 25 years. In 2010, she moved out of North London into a home with a garden, and later began a course in garden design at Capel Manor College while continuing to work for a retail consultancy.

In 2013, she won a RHS Fresh Talent award at the Chelsea Flower Show. In 2016, she won a gold medal at RHS Hampton Court Garden Festival for a conceptual garden with climate change and renewable energy themes. In 2021, Anderson designed a featured garden at the Chelsea Flower Show, titled The BBC One Show and RHS Garden of Hope.

From 2019 to 2021, she presented Garden Rescue with Charlie Dimmock and The Rich Brothers.
