= Geoffrey Smith (gardener) =

British gardener (1928–2009)

Geoffrey Denis Smith
- Born: 23 March 1928; Barningham Park, Barningham, North Riding of Yorkshire, England
- Died: 27 February 2009 (aged 80) near Harrogate, England
- Occupation: Gardener
- Known for: Writer and TV and radio presenter

Geoffrey Denis Smith (23 March 1928 – 27 February 2009) was a professional gardener, broadcaster, writer and lecturer. He was the presenter of Gardeners World from 1980 to 1982 and a number of other BBC series in the early 80s including Geoffrey Smith's World of Flowers, Mr Smith's Flower Garden, Mr Smith's Favourite Garden and Mr Smith's Indoor Garden all of which were accompanied by books.

== Biography ==
Smith was born at Barningham Park, Barningham, North Riding of Yorkshire (since 1974 in County Durham), where his father was head gardener. He was sent to board at Barnard Castle School but hated the restrictive life there. After leaving school he spent six years helping his father at Barningham Park. Smith trained at the Yorkshire College of Agriculture and Horticulture, which brought him the prize for best all-round student. At the age of 26, he was appointed Superintendent at the Northern Horticultural Society Gardens. He worked as the Superintendent of Harlow Carr gardens in Harrogate from 1954 to 1974 where he was known for growing plants which experts had labelled unfit for the northern climate.

In 1972 he was made an Associate of Honour to the Royal Horticultural Society, for services to gardening, and in 1988 he received an honorary master's degree from the Open University. He won the Garden Writers' Guild Lifetime Achievement Award for 2006 at the age of 78.

He made appearances on BBC TV's Gardening Club which were followed, in 1976, by his first BBC series, Mr Smith's Vegetable Garden. He had a distinctive voice and sharp wit which were well known to radio listeners as he became a regular panelist on Radio 4's Gardeners' Question Time.

Smith was a prolific writer, contributing to The Lady, Garden News and The Garden. His many books became gardening best sellers, among them Mr Smith's Flower Garden, Gardening (Sure & Simple), A Passion for Plants, The Book of Primroses, Shrubs and Small Trees for Your Garden and The Joy of Wildlife Gardening.

Geoffrey Smith lived in the heart of the Yorkshire Dales and his hobbies included fell-walking, photography, fly fishing and a passionate interest in all things pertaining to the countryside.

== Quote ==
Put the brown end in the soil, the green end above it, and you're in with a much better chance.

== Personal life ==
Smith was a Baptist.
