= Rachel de Thame =

British gardener and television presenter

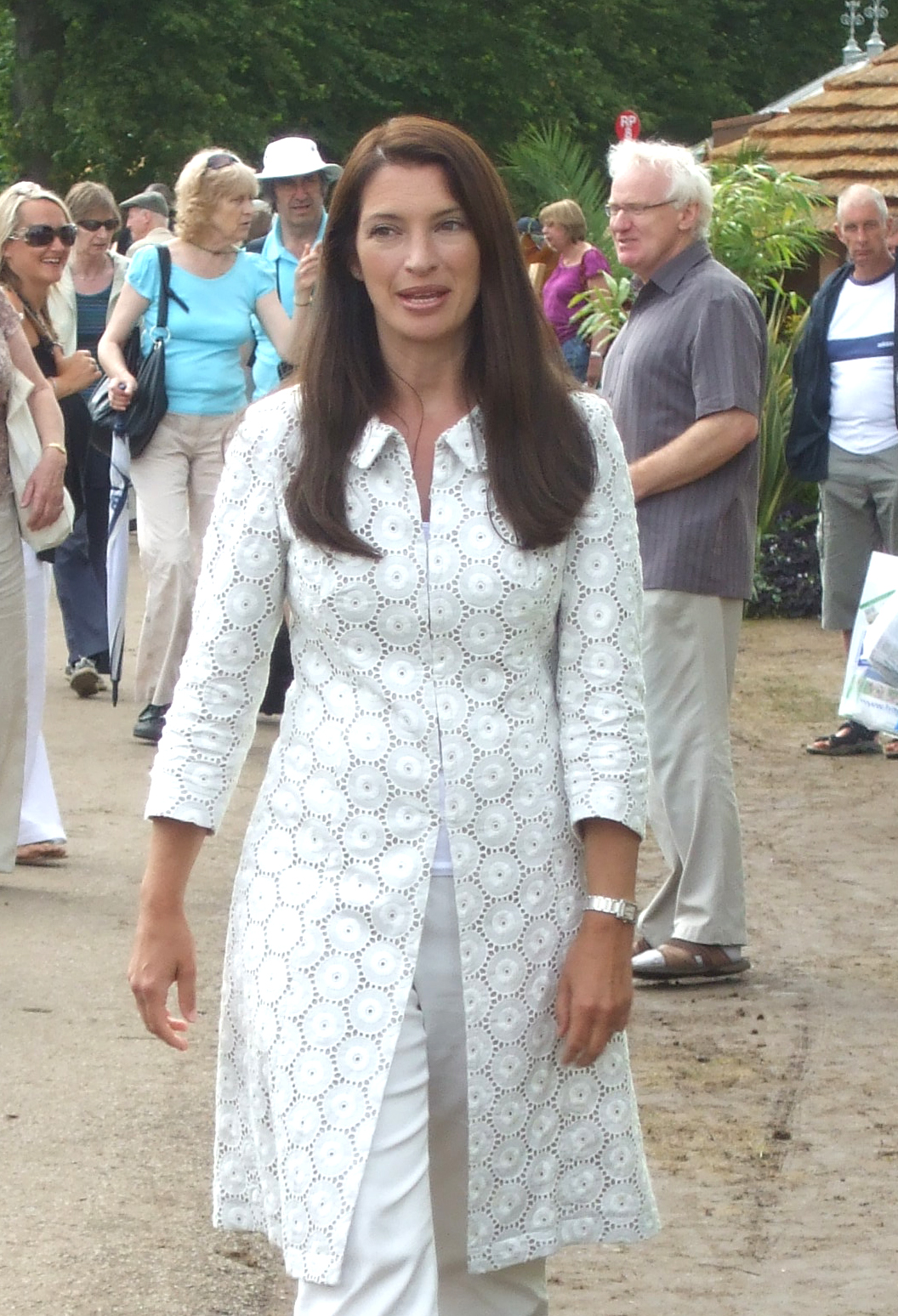
- De Thame at the 2009 Hampton Court Palace Flower Show
- Occupations: Gardener, television presenter, actress
- Years active: 1988–present
- Spouses: Stephen Colover (m. 1986; div. 1993) Gerard de Thame (m. 1999)
- Children: 4

Rachel de Thame (born Rachel Cohen) is an English gardener, television presenter and actress.

== Biography ==
From the age of 10, de Thame studied ballet to a professional standard at the Royal Ballet School, White Lodge, Richmond Park. De Thame contracted glandular fever at age 15, and chose to give up her dream of a dancing career at age 19. She then undertook a course in Drama at Southgate College in 1979–80 and studied History of Art at London's City Lit, after which she worked for a short period for Colnaghi, a well-respected international firm of art dealers in London. She then married for the first time.

While pregnant with her first baby, de Thame was recruited by a modelling agency and went on to enjoy a successful modelling career. A major part of de Thame's modelling included appearances in TV ads. Casting agents began to suggest de Thame for acting roles. By 1998, she had appeared in the mini-series Merlin and in the British feature film Bodywork, credited in both productions as Rachel Colover.

However, de Thame decided not to continue pursuing an acting career and in 1998, indulging a passion for plants and gardening inherited from her father, she enrolled for two years at the English Gardening School, studying Practical Horticulture and Plants & Plantsmanship, shortly after de Thame auditioned for BBC2's Gardeners' World. Initially presenting on the programme every week, following the birth of her second child from her second marriage, she has made occasional appearances on the programme. She has also filmed her own series' for the BBC, Small Town Gardens and Gardening with the Experts. De Thame also co-presents the BBC's annual coverage of the Chelsea Flower Show, Hampton Court Palace Flower Show as part of the Royal Horticultural Society output on BBC Two. Other gardening series include Gardeners' World Top Tips and Great British Garden Revival for the BBC, and Countrywise for ITV1. Non-gardening related television appearances include Going for a Song and Call My Bluff, both for the BBC.

In 2008, de Thame designed the 2008 LK Bennett garden at the Chelsea Flower Show, for which she was awarded a silver medal. In 2012 de Thame designed the floral decorations for the Royal Barge (The Spirit of Chartwell), used to convey Her Majesty The Queen and other members of the Royal Family during the Thames Diamond Jubilee Pageant. In 2016 de Thame co-curated the RHS London Rose Show

De Thame has written two gardening books, Small Town Gardens and Rachel de Thame's Top 100 Star Plants, and co-wrote Gardening with the Experts. She currently writes a regular horticultural column for The Sunday Times and has also contributed to the gardening pages of The Daily Telegraph, Gardeners' World Magazine, Woman's Own Magazine, and Eden Magazine.

She is currently vice-president of the wildflower charity Plantlife.

De Thame has a lupin variety named after her. In addition to Dahlia 'Rachel de Thame', Auricula 'Rachel de Thame and Rose 'Rachel' were also named in her honour by Pococks Roses.

In 2024 de Thame teamed up with her daughter Lauren, an illustrator, for her new book A Flower Garden For Pollinators.

== Personal life ==
She was raised near North London, the daughter and granddaughter of predominantly Jewish immigrants.

De Thame married her first husband, Stephen Colover, in June 1986. They had two children, and divorced around 1993.

She and her second husband, Gerard de Thame, have two children. They live in West London and the Cotswolds, Gloucestershire, having moved from Oxfordshire.

She was diagnosed with breast cancer in early 2018 and began treatment.

She continues to participate in gardening events, talks, and live presentations through venues such as BBC Gardeners’ World Live, talks at garden/flower shows, etc.
