= Love Your Garden =

British gardening and lifestyle TV series

- Genre: Gardening
- Presented by: Alan Titchmarsh
- Starring: David Domoney; Katie Rushworth; Frances Tophill; Danny Clarke
- Country of origin: United Kingdom
- Original language: English
- No. of series: 11
- No. of episodes: 81

Production
- Running time: 30 minutes (2011; 2018); 60 minutes (2012-2023)
- Production company: Spun Gold Productions

Original release
- Network: ITV
- Release: 10 June 2011 – 2023

Related
- Gardener's World

Love Your Garden was a British lifestyle gardening programme, first broadcast on ITV on 10 June 2011. The show was hosted by Alan Titchmarsh alongside co-presenters David Domoney, Katie Rushworth and Frances Tophill, and saw the team visit locations around the United Kingdom helping people to transform their gardens.

In the first series, Titchmarsh visited themed gardens around the United Kingdom, specific to the topic of the episode, and advised viewers on how to transform their gardens. However, since the second series, Titchmarsh and the team transformed the gardens of people who are described as "deserving them the most".

Landscape designer David Dodd joined Titchmarsh, Domoney, Rushworth and Tophill during the second season. Dodd's company, The Outdoor Room, left the show in October 2013.

Series 13 aired in 2023. In March 2024, the website HortWeek reported that there were no plans to film a new series of the show.
