= David Domoney =

Horticulturist and TV gardening presenter

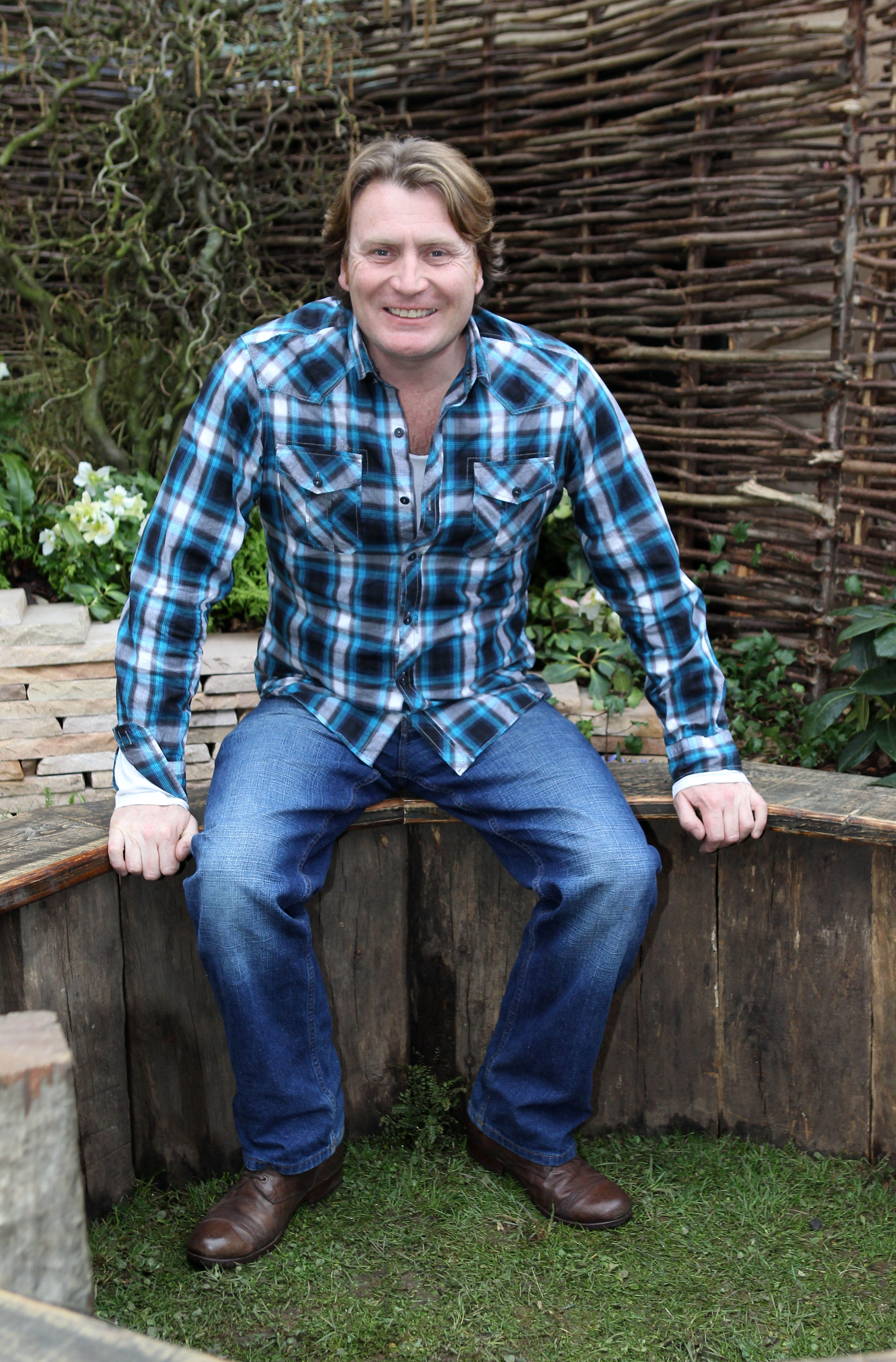
- Domoney (2012
- Born: 26 March 1963 (age 62); Devizes, Wiltshire, England
- Occupations: Horticulturalist, broadcaster, writer, gardener
- Television: This Morning (2011—); Love Your Garden (2012—)
- Website: daviddomoney.com

David Martin Domoney, C Hort. FCI Hort (born 26 March 1963) is an English Chartered Horticulturist and celebrity gardener. He co-presents the TV gardening programme Love Your Garden, alongside Alan Titchmarsh, and is the resident gardener on ITV1's This Morning.

Domoney maintains a gardening advice website and writes regular columns for the Sunday Mirror and Grow Your Own magazine. In 2011, Domoney created the Young Gardeners of the Year competition in association with the Prince of Wales' The Prince's Foundation to showcase new British talent in garden design and construction. In 2013, Domoney also founded Cultivation Street, which is a national campaign to promote school and community gardening with an associated competition.

== Life ==
David Domoney was born in 1963 in Devizes, Wiltshire, and was one of three children. He is the son of Raymond Domoney, who was a British Telecoms senior executive, and Jean Domoney, who was an Area Sales Manager for Tupperware. Jean was born in Rothesay on the Isle of Bute, Scotland.

Domoney attended Moseley School in Birmingham until leaving in 1979, aged 16. He went on to further study at Warwickshire College of Agriculture, where he gained a Pre Cert. Horticulture qualification. In 1980, Domoney enrolled in one of the last of the industry's old-style comprehensive three-year apprenticeships with Notcutts Nursery & Garden Centre Group (at the time, the Harrods of horticulture), which included study time at Hadlow College of Agriculture and Horticulture. At Nottcutts, Domoney acted as an Advisor and, later, a Manager in their Plant Advice Centre. In 1983, Domoney completed his Notcutts apprenticeship and went on to study full-time at Pershore College, where he earned an Advanced Certificate in Horticulture (ANCH). Domoney's career in horticulture continued with a position as Sales and Marketing Manager for Anglia Nurseries and then the Horticulture Director for Seasons Garden Centre Group PLC. Domoney then spent a decade heading up global buying teams for Texas Homecare and Do It All.

Domoney's broadcasting career began at Texas Homecare, where he presented gardening features on their satellite TV station for the company's 20,000 staff.

In 1999, Domoney formed his own garden design and gardening and lifestyle PR company, Domoney Ltd. His company's clients have included Everest, Pavestone, Globus, FITT, John Lewis, Harley Davidson, The Ritz, Lexus, Croft Sherry, Laura Ashley, Manchester Children's Hospital, the British Trust of Ornithology, and Levive Diamonds. Domoney has also landscaped gardens for other celebrities, including presenter, Phillip Schofield, in 2010, and England striker Michael Owen for his 'Hello' magazine wedding shoot. Domoney raised finance for his garden designs at Royal Horticultural Society (RHS) flower shows, including the Chelsea Flower Show, Hampton Court Palace Flower Show, and Tatton Park Flower Show, as well as at Gardeners' World Live. Domoney has won 30 Royal Horticultural Society medals, including Best in Show and Chelsea Gold awards, and in 2018, was selected by Prince Edward to receive the Award for Excellence in Horticultural Career Development.

== Career ==
=== Television ===
David Domoney has been a presenter on prime time and national television shows since 2002. These include:

- Love Your Garden (2012–present)
- James Martin's Saturday Morning (Feb 2019–present)
- The Alan Titchmarsh Show (2011–2013)
- Garden ER (2011–2013)
- 60 Minute Makeover (2009–2010)
- This Morning (2006–2017)
- Solution Street (2005)
- House of Horrors (2003–2004)
- Better Homes (2002–2003)
- House Auction (2003)
- Gardeners from Hell
- Plant Doctor (2002)

Domoney has also featured as a gardening and nature expert on The Chris Evans Breakfast Show.

=== Garden designs ===
Domoney created an underwater garden with five tanks of piranha fish and plant biotopes at the RHS Chelsea Flower Show in 2009. The following year he created the Ace of Diamonds garden – the most expensive show garden seen at the Chelsea Flower Show with £20m worth of diamonds.

For Harley Davidson, he built a garden for a Hells Angel, which even had a sculpture Ace of Spades made from Spades. He built the 2010 World Cup football garden at BBC Gardeners World Live, and he created a garden in 2015 with the biggest treehouse seen at a garden event for Quiet Mark, John Lewis & Lexus at RHS Hampton Court Palace.

Domoney was approached by the Commonwealth War Graves Commission (CWGC) to design a garden for the Chelsea Flower Show 2017.

=== Books ===
Domoney published his first book with DK books on 4 February 2021, titled My Houseplant Changed My Life. The book looks at how houseplants can have a positive impact on mental wellbeing and physical health.

== Achievements ==
- Selected by Prince Edward to receive his 2018 Award for Excellence in Horticultural Career Development
- Winner of 30 RHS Medals for garden design, floral and scientific exhibits in every RHS category (1999–2019)
- Winner of 4 & 5 Star RHS trade stands 2015
- Winner of RHS Chelsea Flower Best City Garden Trophy 2006
- Winner of RHS Most Creative Show Garden Trophy 2008
- Winner of the Frank Howell Trophy awarded to the most outstanding old student from Warwickshire College Group
- Awarded honorary membership of the HTA (Horticultural Trades Association) for services to the horticultural industry 2015
- Awarded honorary membership of BALI (British Association of Landscape Industries) for services to the horticultural industry 2010
- Winner of the GIMA (Garden Industry Manufacturers Association) Best Designed Product Trophy 2009

=== Other projects ===
Domoney sits on the Royal Horticultural Society (RHS) Commercial Board and is a Governor at the London Colleges of Horticulture at Capel Manor.

== Personal life ==
=== Charity work ===
He is the Gardening Ambassador for THRIVE, a British garden charity, which aims to enable positive change in the lives of disabled and disadvantaged people through the use of gardening and social horticultural therapy.

David is an ambassador of the Melanoma Fund, a charity that raises awareness of melanoma and other forms of skin cancer.

For over 15 years, David has hosted the charity auctions/lotto for Euro plants open days. Since childhood Domoney has collected for the Methodist charity, JMA.
