= Gardeners' World =

British TV gardening programme (since 1968)

- 2008 programme title
- Starring: Monty Don; Adam Frost; Frances Tophill; Arit Anderson; Advolly Richmond; Nick Bailey; Mark Lane; Rachel de Thame; Carol Klein; Sue Kent; Joe Swift; Jamie Butterworth; Rekha Mistry
- Theme music composer: Morning Light by Will Gregory
- Country of origin: United Kingdom
- Original language: English

Production
- Running time: 30–60 min. each
- Production companies: BBC Birmingham (1998–2016); BBC Studios Factual Entertainment Productions (2016–present)

Original release
- Network: BBC Two
- Release: 5 January 1968 – present

Related
- Beechgrove; Ground Force; Love Your Garden; The Big Allotment Challenge

Gardeners' World is a long-running British gardening programme, first broadcast on 5 January 1968. The 2026 series is the 57th. Its first series was presented by Ken Burras and came from Oxford Botanical Gardens. Up until 2020 most of its episodes have been 30 minutes in duration; however, this changed in spring 2020 when the format was extended to an hour. All episodes in the 2021 series onwards follow this 60-minute format. Gardeners' World currently airs between mid-March and late October on BBC Two every Friday. The programme usually takes a four-month winter break from November to February.

Since 2011 the programme's main presenter has been Monty Don. Other regular presenters include Adam Frost, Frances Tophill, Joe Swift, Arit Anderson, Advolly Richmond, Nick Bailey, Carol Klein, Mark Lane and Rachel de Thame. The magazine BBC Gardeners' World is a tie-in to the programme. In September 2026, Don announced that he would be standing down as the programme's main presenter.

== Presenters ==
=== Lead ===
Lead presenters have included:

- Ken Burras (1968–1969)
- Percy Thrower (1969–1976)
- Arthur Billitt (1976–1979)
- Geoff Hamilton (1979–1996)
- Geoffrey Smith (1980–1982)
- Alan Titchmarsh (1996–2002)
- Monty Don (2003–2008)
- Toby Buckland (2008–2010)
- Monty Don (2011–2026)

In September 2026, Don announced that he would be standing down as the programme's main presenter.

=== Co-presenters ===
Co-presenters have included: Arit Anderson, Nick Bailey, Chris Baines, JJ Chalmers, Nigel Colborn, Chris Beardshaw, Stefan Buczacki, Flo Headlam, Bob Flowerdew, Alys Fowler, Adam Frost, Diarmuid Gavin, Pippa Greenwood, Clay Jones, John Kelly, Sue Kent, (Note: Born in 1963 with phocomelia of both arms, eight inches long, no thumbs, and seven fingers – three on one hand, four on the other, Kent has appeared as a presenter on the show since 2020, demonstrating her ability to garden using her feet and toes where others would use their hands.) Carol Klein, Roy Lancaster, Mark Lane, Rekha Mistry, Arthur Parkinson, Sarah Raven, Advolly Richmond, Liz Rigbey, Rod and Rachel Saunders, (Note: The Saunders were murdered in an unrelated robbery two days after their last appearance on the show. Bailey and his recording crew were among the last to see the couple alive on February 8, 2018. The episode was dedicated in their memory.) Peter Seabrook, Gay Search, Geoffrey Smith, Mary Spiller, Joe Swift, Anne Swithinbank, Rachel de Thame, Frances Tophill, Christine Walkden, and Ali Ward.

== Locations ==
Since its inception in 1968, the show was presented until 2003 from the lead presenter's own garden. In 2011, the show returned to this practice.

- First was Percy Thrower's The Magnolias near Shrewsbury
- Then Arthur Billitt's Clack's Farm at Ombersley in Worcestershire
- Followed by two gardens, both called Barnsdale, owned by Geoff Hamilton in Rutland
- Next was Alan Titchmarsh's garden at Woodroyd in Alton, Hampshire, renamed Barleywood for the programme
- Next was a rented garden, called Burmans Farm at Shottery (52°11′29.59″N 1°44′6.4″W) in Stratford-upon-Avon which was called Berryfields for the purposes of the programme although it was often described as a 'top secret location near Birmingham'
- Partly as a result of changes in the presenters, for the 2009 series the garden was relocated to Edgbaston in Birmingham. A playing-field was redeveloped and this garden was given the name Greenacre. This garden was intended to be a permanent home for the programme.
- In 2011, with the return of Monty Don, the base relocated to Don's own garden Longmeadow in Herefordshire (52°12′22.4″N 2°46′49.2″W).

== History ==
The 2010 show was returned to the original 30 minutes and several features of the 2009 series, such as the '30 second fix', were dropped. The show concentrated more on gardening content, reintroducing 'Jobs for the weekend' and focusing on plant species.

In March 2011, Monty Don returned as the main presenter of the programme.

In 2016 new executive producer Paolo Proto (previously producer of The Great British Bake Off) extended the programme from 30 minutes to one hour in September and October, also introducing new presenters Adam Frost, Frances Tophill, Nick Bailey, Nick Macer, Florence Headlam and Arit Anderson.

== Theme tunes ==
The first theme tune to the series in 1968 was a piece composed by Peter Craddy and played by Michael Saxton on clarinet. A year later this was replaced by the long-running Green Fingers composed by John Clarke and Reg Reid, played by Harold Rich & His Players, a version of which, with sweeping strings, was soon used. The most famous theme, which had the longest run from the late 1980s through the 1990s and is still heard in a slightly classical vein today, is a guitar piece that was composed by Nick Webb and Greg Carmichael. It had two titles, one for commercial release and one for library, Morning Light and Natural Elements. Natural Elements was the title track of a commercial album released in 1988 on MCA Records under the composers' band name of Acoustic Alchemy. The current theme tune, introduced in 2014, is an arrangement of "Morning Light" by Will Gregory.

== Links and spin offs ==
Former lead presenter, Alan Titchmarsh later teamed up with Charlie Dimmock and Tommy Walsh to make the series Ground Force. This was about rapid garden makeovers.

A book based on the history of the series entitled Gardeners' World Through The Years was released in 2003 by Gay Search.

== BBC Gardeners' World Live ==
The BBC Gardeners' World Live Show is an extension of the television programme and magazine. Running annually in June, it is hosted at the Birmingham NEC, co-located with the BBC Summer Good Food Show.

The show includes live appearances from the presenters giving topical advice and tips including many of the presenters, such as Alan Titchmarsh, Monty Don, Carol Klein and Joe Swift, Toby Buckland, Alys Fowler, Chris Baines, Diarmuid Gavin, Anne Swithinbank, Pippa Greenwood, Rachel de Thame, Bob Flowerdew and Mark Lane.

The presenters film at BBC Gardeners' World Live, with the content aired within the programme on the Friday night of the live show.

Due to the COVID-19 pandemic, the 2020 show was cancelled, with the next scheduled for 17–20 June 2021.

A number of new rose varieties have been launched at the show including

- 2016: Roses UK presented the new 'Eve Rose' to Simon Lycett on behalf of the Eve Foundation
- 2008: Rachel de Thame presented the new rose 'Prince Caspian' to actor Ben Barnes
- 2005: The show presented the new 'Duchess of Cornwall' rose to the Duchess of Cornwall

== See also ==
- Beechgrove Garden, a long-running gardening show from BBC Scotland.
