= House Auction =

British television series

House Auction is a programme on the United Kingdom television station Channel 4, which aired during the channel's weekday daytime programming. As the name suggests, the show features properties for sale at auctions and follows what happens to them afterward—whether they are refurbished and made into homes or converted into business, such as, in one case, a dentist.

== See also ==
- Channel 4
