= Adam Frost (garden designer) =

British garden designer (born 1969)

Adam Frost (born September 1969) is a British garden designer and horticulturist known for his successes at the Chelsea Flower Show and as a presenter on the BBC's Gardeners' World.

== Early life ==
He was born in Harlow in Essex. When he was 15 his family moved to North Devon and he lost interest in school, eventually leaving home to start working.

== Career ==
He started his career working for North Devon Parks Department and then he moved to London, to work as a landscaper. His big break came when he worked with Geoff Hamilton at his garden at Barnsdale, Rutland.

In 2013 he was instrumental in setting up the Homebase Garden Academy and in 2014 became an RHS Ambassador. He is also an author and his book Real Gardens tells the journey of his award-winning Chelsea gardens. He has won seven gold medals at the Chelsea Flower Show. Frost discussed his life and career on BBC Radio 4's Saturday Live in April 2019.

== Personal life ==
On BBC' Gardeners' World, in April 2022, Frost said that he had "downsized", with his family, to a smaller property. He previously lived in Barnack, Lincolnshire.

In April 2025 he introduced Gardeners' World viewers to Buster his new miniature Jack Russell dog.
