= Gay Search =

English television presenter and journalist (born 1945)

- Born: Mary Gay Search; 1 May 1945 (age 80); Hammersmith, London, England
- Occupations: Television presenter; journalist
- Television: Gardeners' World; Front Gardens
- Spouse: Anthony Laryea (m. 1977)
- Children: 2

Mary Gay Laryea (née Search; born 1 May 1945) is an English television presenter and journalist. She worked on the BBC television series Gardeners' World with Geoff Hamilton and on the series Front Gardens.

== Early life ==
Mary Gay Search was born on 1 May 1945 in Hammersmith, London, to Ruth (née Tapsell) and Wilfred Search. As a teenager, Search was a bystander in the capture of the Portland spy ring; her parents' house was used to surveil Peter and Helen Kroger, two members of the ring.

== Career ==
Search started her horticultural career writing the garden column for Woman magazine, with help from Alan Titchmarsh, who prevented her from writing "daft" things. She devised and hosted gardening shows for BBC2 from 1988. She worked as gardening editor for Sainsbury magazine for 13 years as well as the Radio Times.

Search is also patron of the British Thyroid Foundation.

== Personal life ==
Search married Anthony Laryea in 1977 and they have two sons.

== Bibliography ==
- Front Gardens
- Gardening from Scratch
- Gardening without a garden
- Delia's Kitchen Garden, written with Delia Smith.
- Perfect Plants for Problem Places
