= Carol Klein =

English gardening expert and TV presenter

Carol Klein VMH
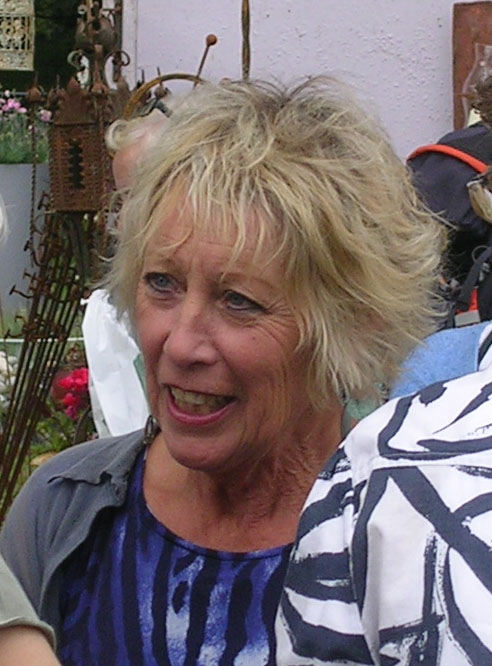
- Klein at the 2010 RHS Tatton Park show
- Born: 24 June 1945 (age 80); Walkden, Lancashire, England
- Education: Bolton School
- Occupations: Garden expert, television presenter, newspaper columnist
- Employer: BBC
- Known for: Television gardening programmes
- Television: Gardeners' World

Carol Ann Klein VMH (born 24 June 1945) is an English gardening expert, who also works as a television presenter and newspaper columnist.

In July 2023 the Royal Horticultural Society named Klein as the RHS Iconic Horticultural Hero 2023.

== Early life ==
Born in Walkden, Lancashire, in 1945, Klein attended Bolton School on a scholarship, but left school when she was 15, due to changes in the catchment area boundaries. (Note: Klein suspects the actual reason she was asked to leave was that her father had spent time in HM Prison Preston for fraud.) She was the eldest child of the family, with two younger brothers. Interviewed for Lancashire Life in 2014 she recalled: "I think I was quite close to being chucked out. I loved art and biology but in those days you had to choose between the two subjects. I was fed up about that." She aspired to art school but her father was opposed and she secured a job as a retail assistant at the Kendal Milne department store in Manchester. Her love of gardening was inspired partly by her grandfather, whose allotment she enjoyed, and partly by her mother.

Klein originally trained as a fine artist and spent many years teaching art in schools and colleges. Klein met her husband Neil in London, where they lived, first in Kensal Rise and later in St Giles Square in Ladbroke Grove. After 13 years she moved from London to North Devon where she established a plant nursery at Glebe Cottage in Chittlehamholt. She exhibited at more than 200 Royal Horticultural Society (RHS) shows and began exhibiting at the annual Chelsea Flower Show in 1990, where she won six gold medals.

== Television and shows ==
Klein made her television debut on Gardeners' World in 1989 and has since presented other gardening programmes such as Real Gardens and Open Gardens. Projects include Life in a Cottage Garden with Carol Klein which followed a year in the life of Klein's garden at Glebe Cottage in North Devon, and Grow Your Own Veg. Each week the programme looked at a different group of crop plants or techniques suitable for home gardening. Both programmes were made for BBC Two. She has been a permanent presenter of Gardeners' World since 2005.

Klein has been described as having a "weather-beaten face, forthright manner and fruity accent – mainly her native Manchester but with hints of West Country."

In 2013 she was a joint presenter for two episodes of BBC's Great British Garden Revival.

In March 2023 the RHS announced Klein as the RHS Iconic Horticultural Hero 2023 and invited her to create a garden at the Hampton Court Palace Garden Festival between 4 and 9 July. RHS Ambassador Klein said: "It's very flattering to have been named the RHS Iconic Horticultural Hero. I've always loved nature, plants and gardening and am lucky that I have been able to forge a career out of my passion. I'm really excited by the challenge and look forward to hearing what visitors think. I intend to be on the garden as much as I can during the show so I can talk to visitors about how to propagate and discuss our shared love of plants." Her show garden at the festival was divided into six main habitats: wetland, woodland, hedgerow, meadow, exposed mountain and seaside, plus a small vegetable patch. She said "My ideas about gardening with nature just seem to reflect the way most people like to garden. And perhaps they want to listen to me because I'm good at talking! I can put an idea across and I hope that I enthuse people: for me, there's no point otherwise. I'm hoping that this show garden will do just that."

In May 2024 she was a co-presenter for BBC's coverage of the Chelsea Flower Show.

In 2024, Klein released her book Hortobiography, an autobiography about her life and career.

== Writing ==
As well as television work, Klein has written a number of books for Mitchell Beazley and writes for gardening publications such as BBC Gardeners' World magazine as well as a column for The Guardian. She writes a weekly column, syndicated through the Trinity Mirror regional's newspaper publishing business, which appears in the "Saturday Extra" magazine given with regional newspaper titles such as the Liverpool Echo and Manchester Evening News.

== Personal life ==
Klein is married to Neil Klein and has two daughters, Annie and Alice. Annie lives in California and Alice lives in Lewisham and has two children. In 2011 Klein closed her nursery business, based at her home at Chittlehamholt, near Umberleigh in Devon, after a dispute with her neighbour.

In 2016 she was voted the nation's favourite gardener in a poll for Yorkshire Women's Life Magazine over her Gardener's World colleague Monty Don.

In March 2018 Klein was awarded the Victoria Medal of Honour by the Royal Horticultural Society.

In May 2024 Klein revealed that she had been diagnosed with breast cancer and had undergone major surgery on 3 April.

On 6 July 2025 she was the castaway for BBC Radio 4's Desert Island Discs, where her choices included Nina Simone's "Feeling Good", "Not Fade Away" by Buddy Holly and the song of the skylark. Her book choice was Flora Britannica(1996) by Richard Mabey.

== Bibliography ==
- Plant Personalities: Choosing and Growing Plants by Character with Jonathan Buckley (Cassell Illustrated, 2004) ISBN 1-84403-046-6
- RHS Grow Your Own Veg (Mitchell Beazley, 2007) ISBN 978-1-84533-293-8
- RHS Grow Your Own Fruit (Mitchell Beazley, 2008) ISBN 978-1-84533-434-5
- RHS Grow Your Own Veg Journal (Mitchell Beazley, 2008) ISBN 978-1-84533-471-0
- Cook Your Own Veg (Mitchell Beazley, 2008) ISBN 978-1-84533-407-9
- Making a Garden (Mitchell Beazley, 2015) ISBN 978-1-84533-797-1
- Hortobiography (Carol Klein, 2024) ISBN 978-1-5291-4424-6
