= Gardener =

Person who tends gardens

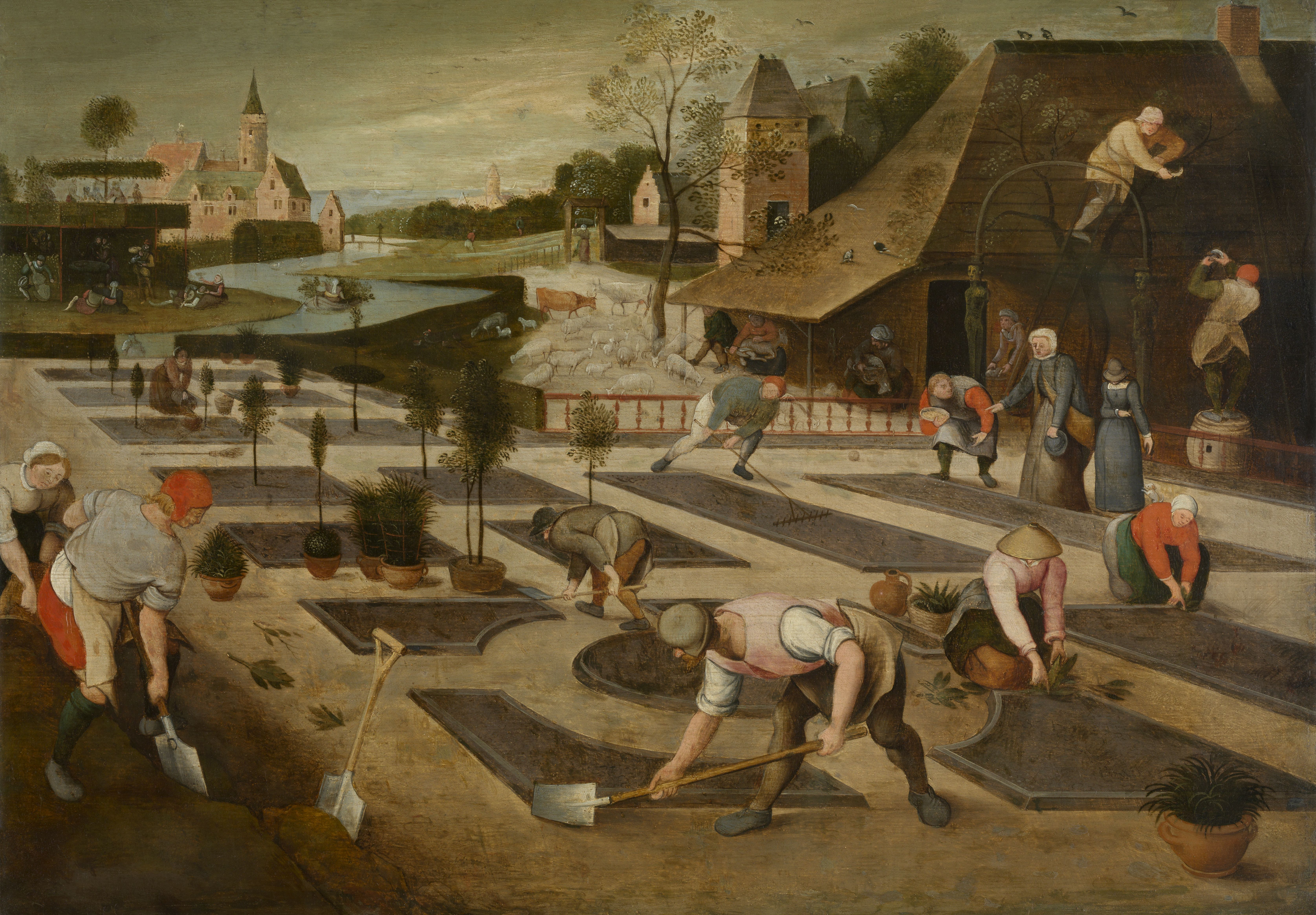
Gardeners at work, painting by Abel Grimmer, Flemish painter, 1607

A gardener is someone who practices gardening, either professionally or as a hobby.

== Description ==
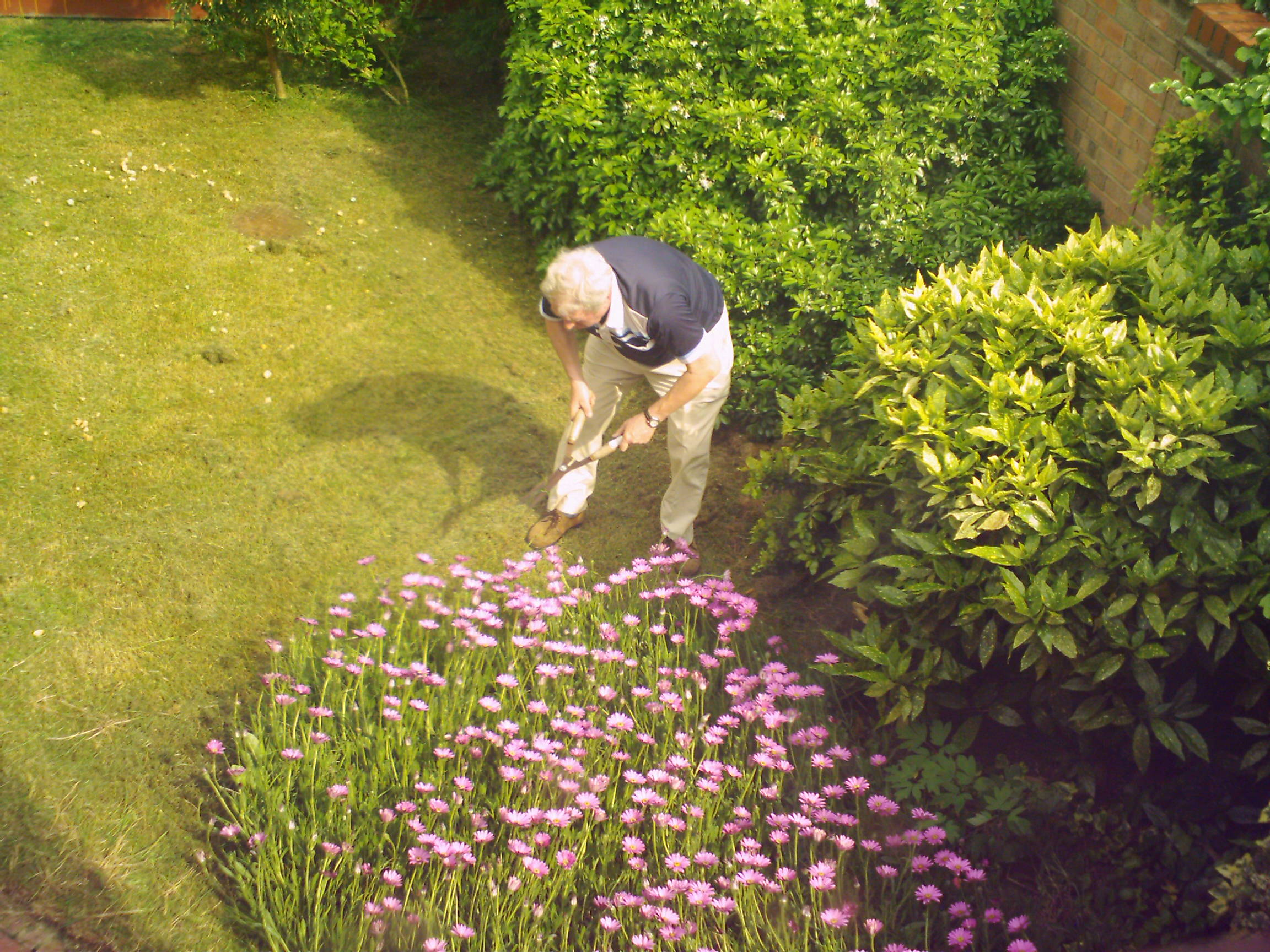
A gardener

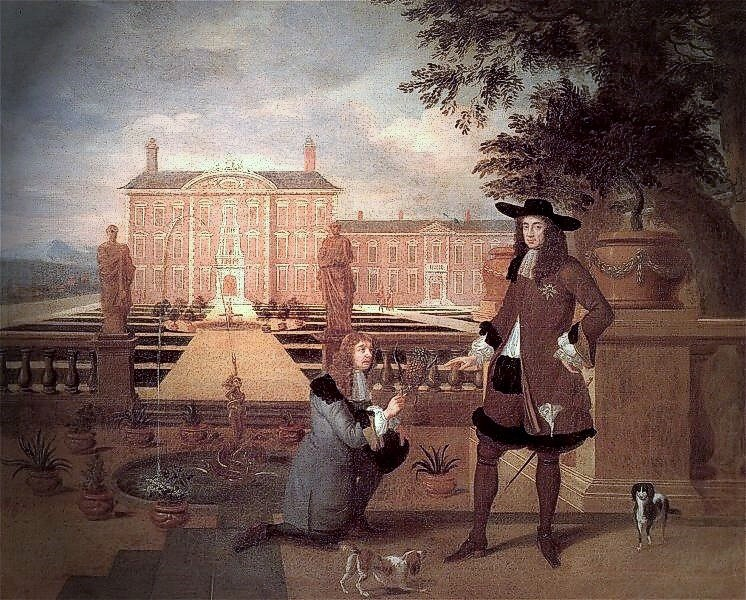
Hendrick Danckerts, Royal Gardener John Rose and King Charles II, 1675

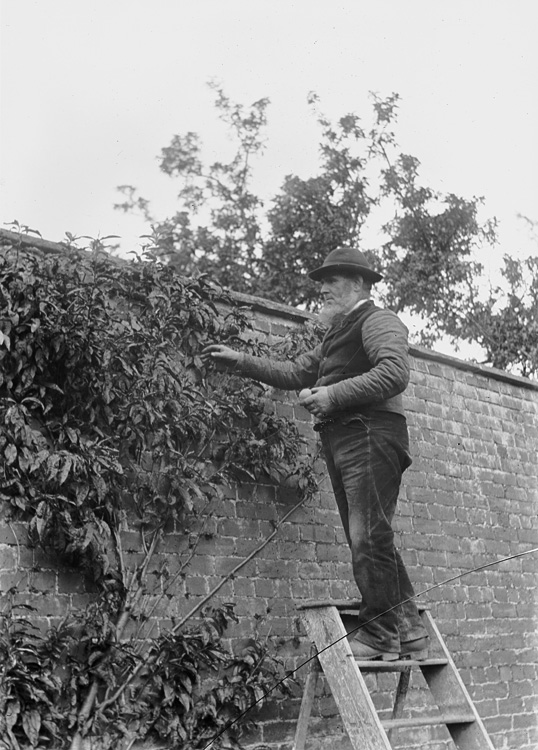
Gardener on a stepladder collecting fruit c.1910

A gardener is any person involved in gardening, arguably the oldest occupation, from the hobbyist in a residential garden, the home-owner supplementing the family food with a small vegetable garden or orchard, to an employee in a plant nursery or the head gardener in a large estate.

== Garden design and maintenance ==
The garden designer is someone who will design the garden, and the gardener is the person who will undertake the work to produce the desired outcome.

== Design ==
The term gardener is also used to describe garden designers and landscape architects, who are involved chiefly in the design of gardens, rather than the practical aspects of horticulture. Garden design is considered to be an art in most cultures, distinguished from gardening, which generally means garden maintenance. Vita Sackville-West, Gertrude Jekyll and William Robinson were garden designers as well as gardeners.

Garden design is the creation of a plan for the construction of a garden, in a design process. The product is the garden, and the garden designers attempt to optimize the given general conditions of the soil, location and climate, ecological, and geological conditions and processes to choose the right plants in corresponding conditions. The design can include different themes such as perennial, butterfly, wildlife, Japanese, water, tropical, or shade gardens. In 18th-century Europe, country estates were refashioned by landscape gardeners into formal gardens or landscaped park lands, such as at Versailles, France, or Stowe Gardens, England.

Today, landscape architects and garden designers continue to design both private garden spaces, residential estates and parkland, public parks and parkways to site planning for campuses and corporate office parks. Professional landscape designers are certified by the Association of Professional Landscape Designers.

== Maintenance ==
The designer also provides directions and supervision during construction, and the management of establishment and maintenance once the garden has been created. The gardener is the person who has the skill to maintain the garden's design.

The gardener's labor during the year includes planting flowers and other plants, weeding, pruning, grafting, deadheading, mixing and preparation of insecticides and other products for pest control, and tending garden compost. Weeds tend to thrive at the expense of the more refined edible or ornamental plants. Gardeners need to control weeds using physical or chemical methods to stop weeds from reaching a mature stage of growth when they could be harmful to domesticated plants. Early activities such as starting young plants from seeds for later transplantation are usually performed in early spring.

== See also ==
- History of gardening
- Landscape architecture
- Celebrity gardener
- List of professional gardeners
- Garden centre
- Flower garden
- Order of Free Gardeners
