= Hampton Court Garden Festival =

Annual British flower show

Coordinates: 51.4021°N 0.3267°W

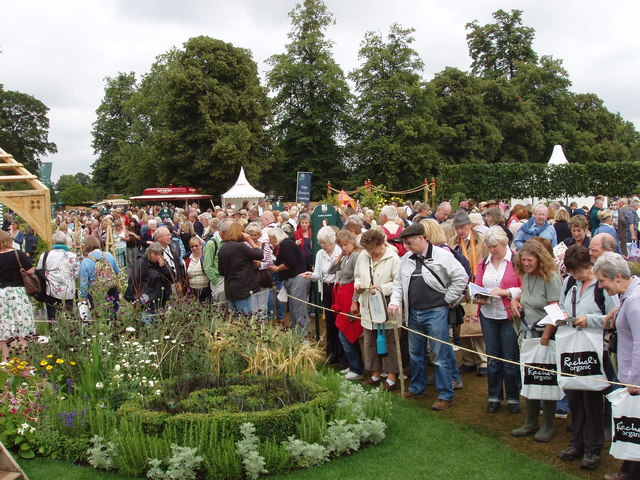
Visitors at the 2009 show

The Hampton Court Garden Festival (formerly the Hampton Court Flower Show) is an annual British flower show, held in early July of each year. The show is run by the Royal Horticultural Society (RHS) in Hampton Court Park next to Hampton Court Palace in the London Borough of Richmond upon Thames. The show features show gardens, floral marquees, and a trade show.

== History ==
=== Foundation ===
The original Hampton Court Palace Flower Show was the brainchild of the management consultant Adrian Boyd, who saw an opportunity to connect two organisations facing times of uncertainty in a joint venture. The Department of the Environment had been dismembered in the 1980s, and one of the results was Historic Royal Palaces, which found itself looking for ways of increasing revenue and attracting a larger audience. Similarly, Network SouthEast (NSE), one of the temporary aggregations thrown up by the pre-privatisation of British Rail, was looking for ways of making its rail services more profitable. Boyd's idea was that Network SouthEast should sponsor a flower show at Hampton Court, and provide the public transport to Hampton Court railway station. At the time the RHS Shows Department was working on four new events for 1993, in Birmingham, Harrogate, Wembley, and Glasgow.

=== Early shows – 1990 to 1992 ===
In July 1990 the first Hampton Court Palace Flower Show was held. An effort was made to attract people to the show with special trains being laid from London Waterloo and porters wore carnations in their hats to create a buzz around the show. Even though there was comparatively little trade support for the show, it drew in large crowds. Network SouthEast was pleased, saying "70 per cent of the estimated 300,000 visitors used rail and that has paid for our sponsorship many times over".

The RHS debated whether to offer assistance with the show, especially when Chelsea reached full capacity. After initial dismissal, the organizers indicated they would welcome RHS involvement from 1992, and RHS members were granted a reduced admission price at the 1991 show. Adrian Greenoak, the Show's horticultural director, achieved continuous improvement in the standards. The 1991 Show introduced a British Rose Festival with the joint involvement of the Royal National Rose Society and the British Rose Growers' Association.

In November 1992 came the announcement that Network SouthEast was withdrawing its support for the show. A flurry of negotiations took place: Boyd, having no title to the Show, had to join in competitive tendering by blind bid. Stephen Bennett outlined the benefits of RHS involvement: 'We can reduce the costs hugely… Apart from saving publicity costs with our extensive media relations network, we have a colossal amount of equipment. We have around £1m worth of tentage and tons and tons of staging equipment. Try to hire that sort of stuff and it costs and arm and a leg.' Historic Royal Palaces accepted the RHS bid on condition that it undertook to keep certain staff on the payroll, including Adrian Greenoak. The venture was a risky one, with four new shows already booked for 1993.

=== The RHS years – 1993 to present ===
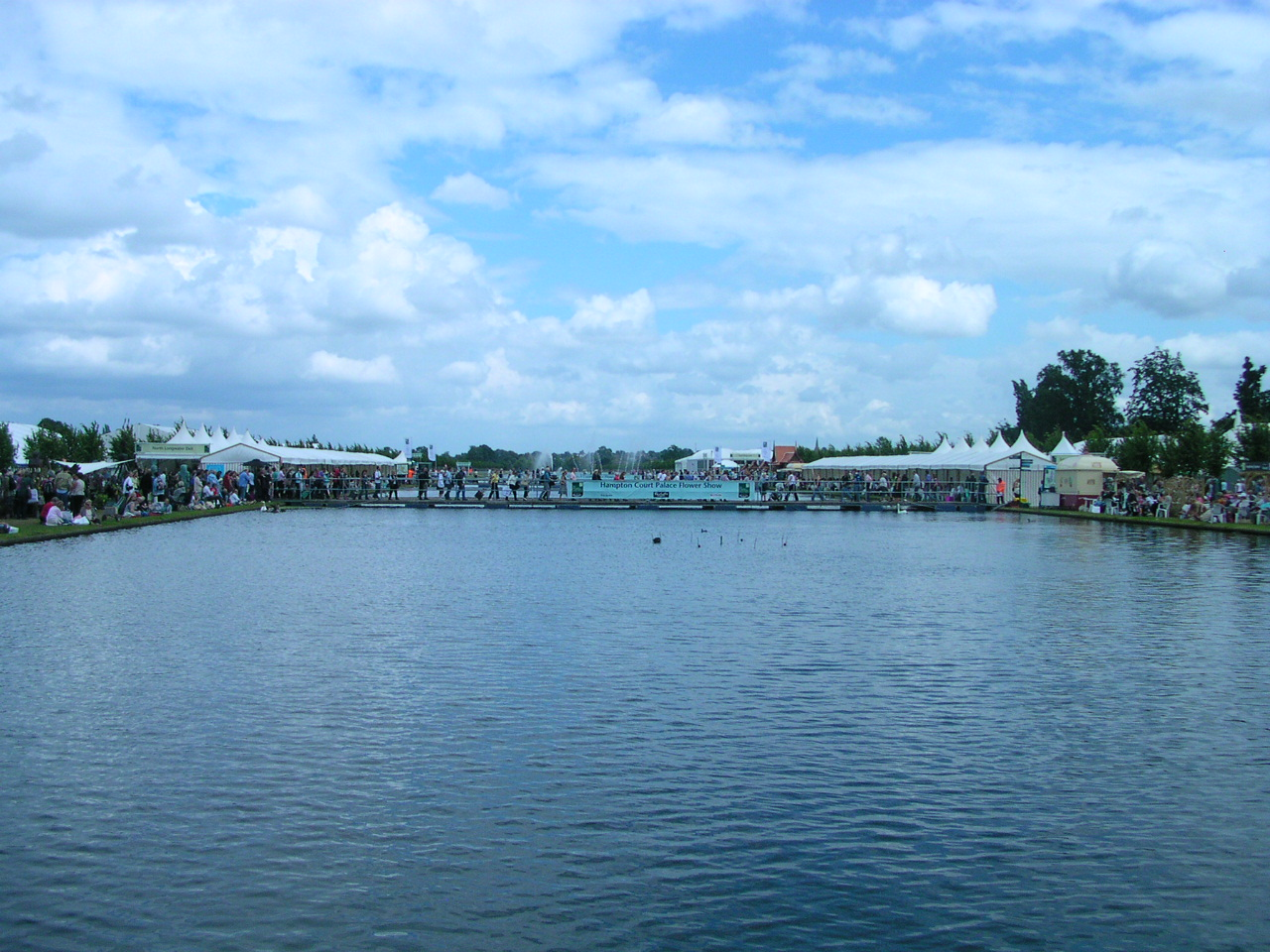
Displays on either side of the Long Water

The first RHS Hampton Court Show took place in 1993, with additional sponsorship from the Daily Mail. The Show was a considerable success, and the following year was declared to be the best outdoor public event of 1994.

With a 25-acre (10 ha) show ground, there was room for considerable expansion before the infrastructure would be severely tested, and over the next few years a Heritage Marquee was set up for the NCCPG and its national collections – initially a rather quiet area, but increasing steadily in public interest; crafts pavilions, which under Adrian Boyd were the first sight to greet the visitor, were gradually moved to a less prominent position; there was room for a couple of dozen display gardens, plus a separate section, on the other side of the Long Water from the major part of the exhibition, for ten water gardens.

In 1998 a Hampton Court garden was rebuilt at the Royal Hospital for Neuro-disability. While Chelsea remained the most prestigious of the Society's shows, Hampton Court was the largest, and readily marketed as such. Within a couple of years the investment in Hampton Court had been more than recouped.

The show rebranded as the Hampton Court Garden Festival in 2019, with the festival manager saying that this "better reflected the atmosphere and the experience of our visitors at the event".

The 2020 festival was cancelled due to the COVID-19 pandemic, along with most of that year's other RHS flower shows.

== Dates ==
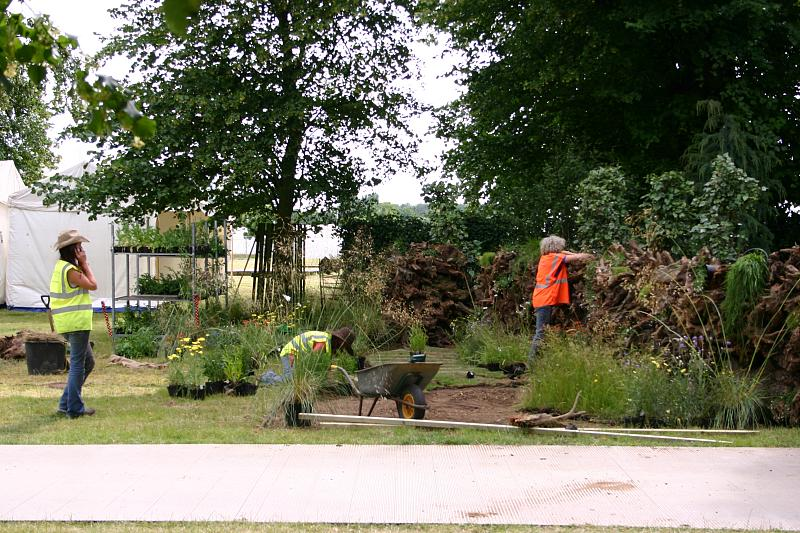
A stand under construction in 2008

The show is always held on a Tuesday until Sunday, usually ending on the second Sunday in July.

== Gallery ==
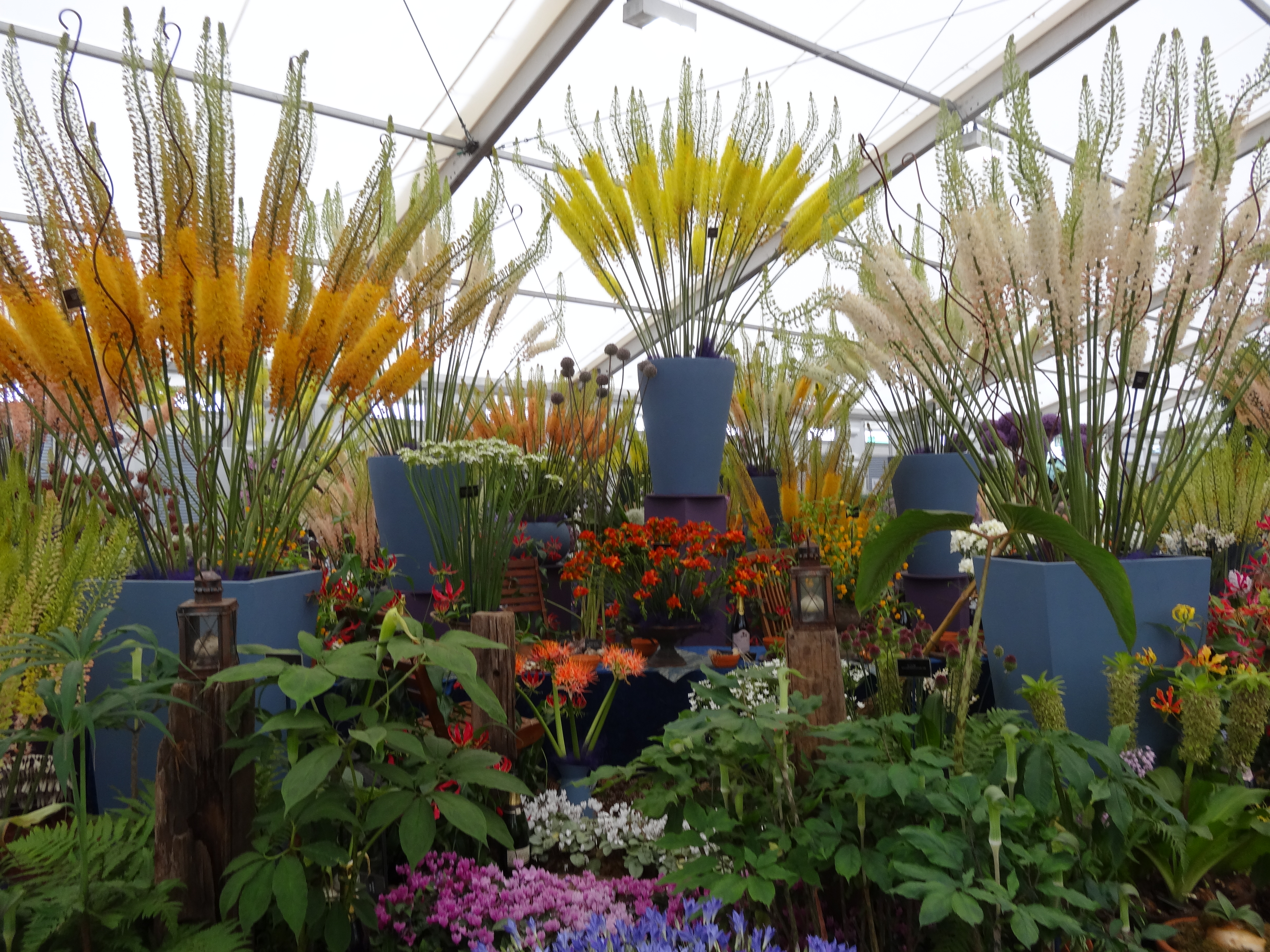
Jacques Amand's display in the Floral Marquee

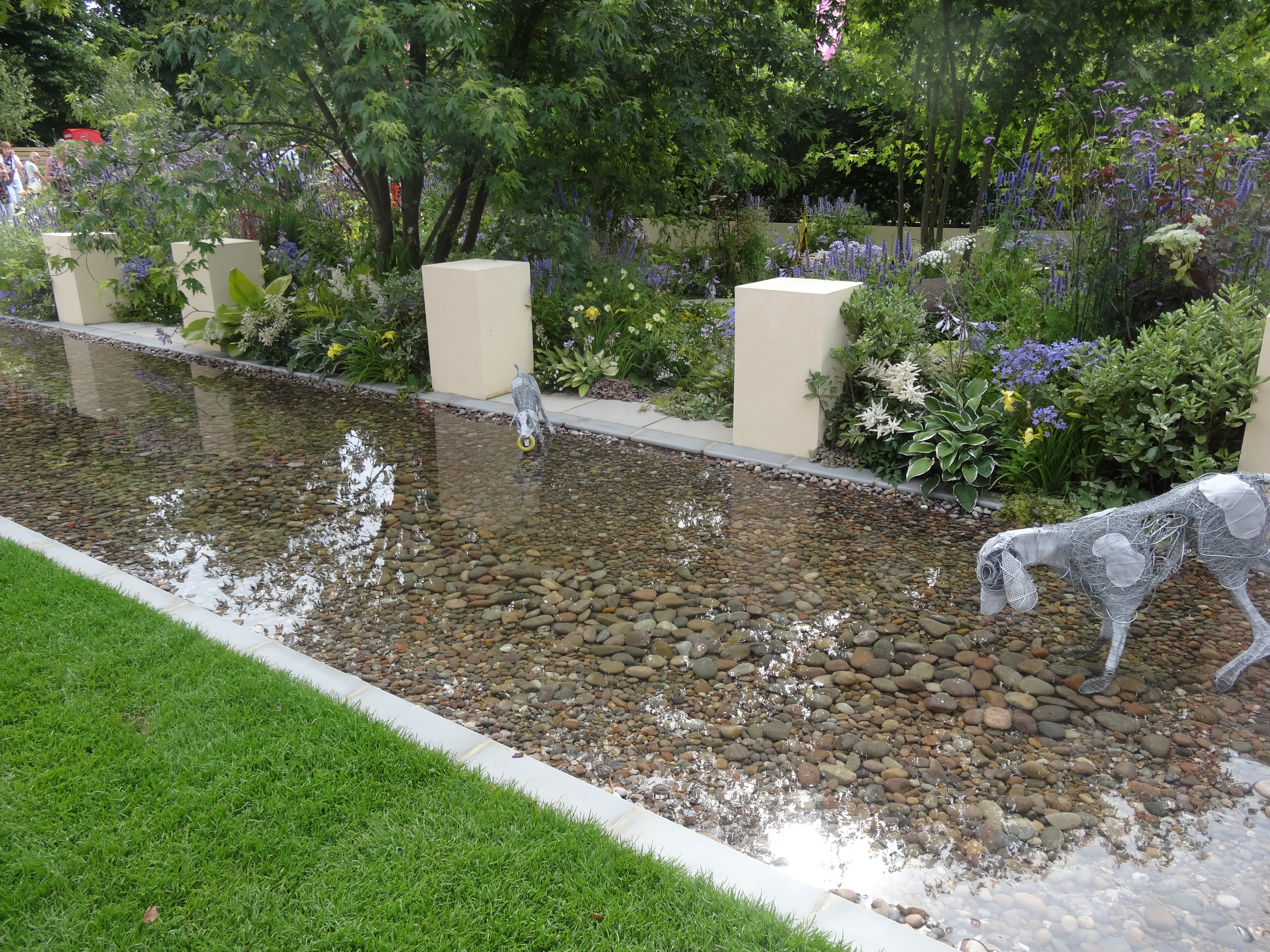
A Dog's Life – a gold-winning garden

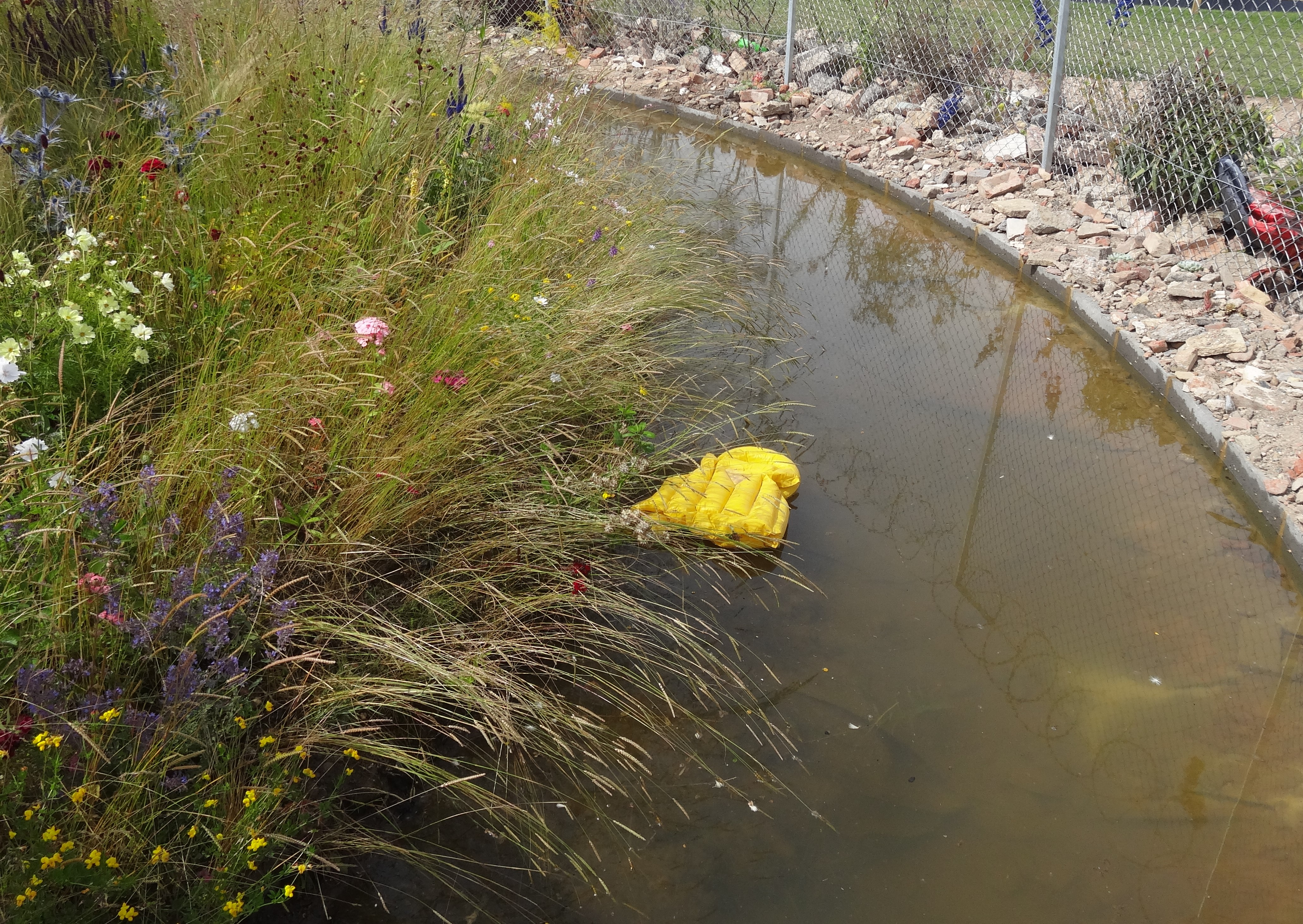
A life jacket floats in the water at the UNHCR Border Control garden, 2016's Best Conceptual Garden

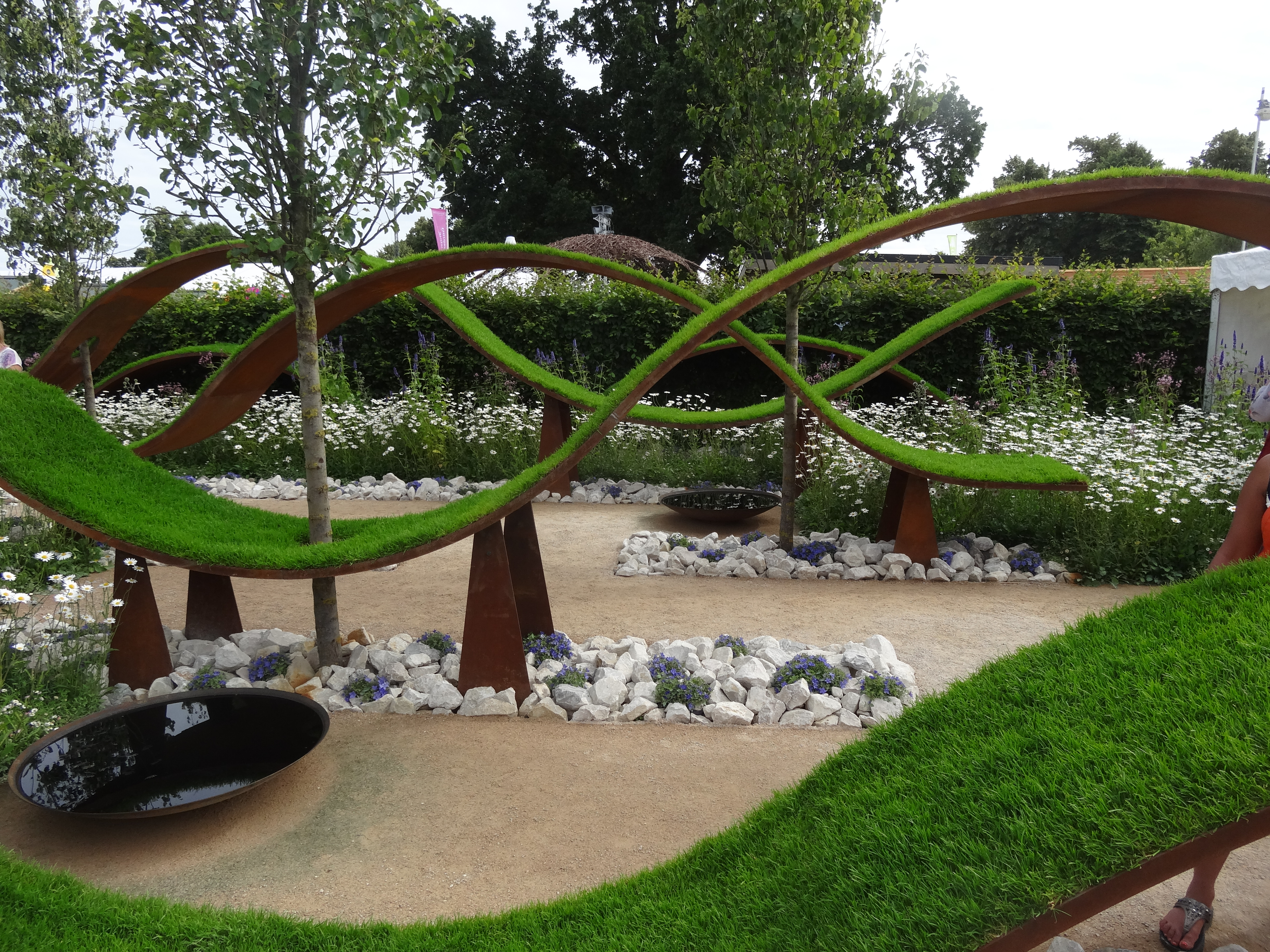
World Vision Garden had curved lawns floating in the air

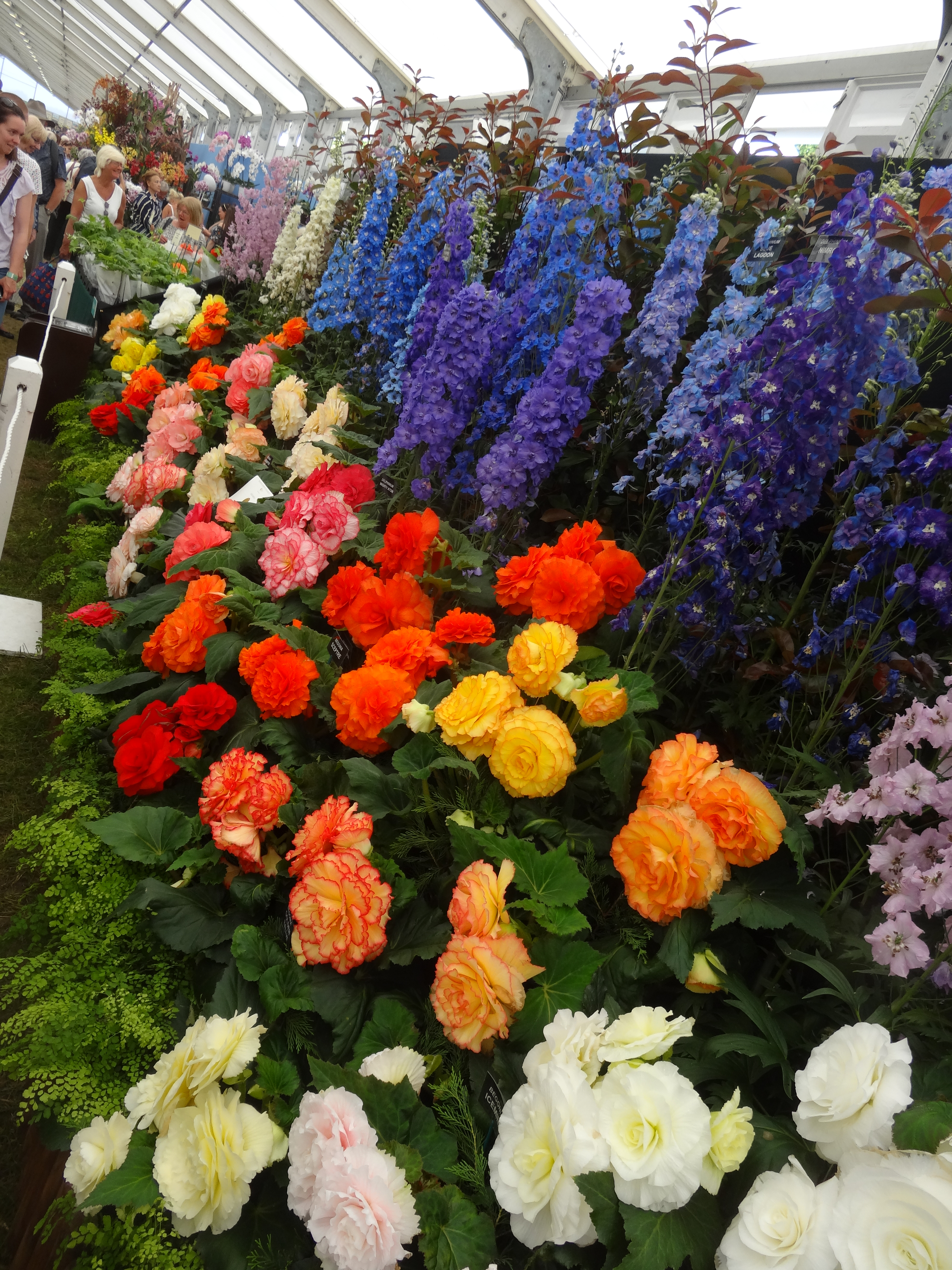
Begonias and Delphiniums from Blackmore & Langdon

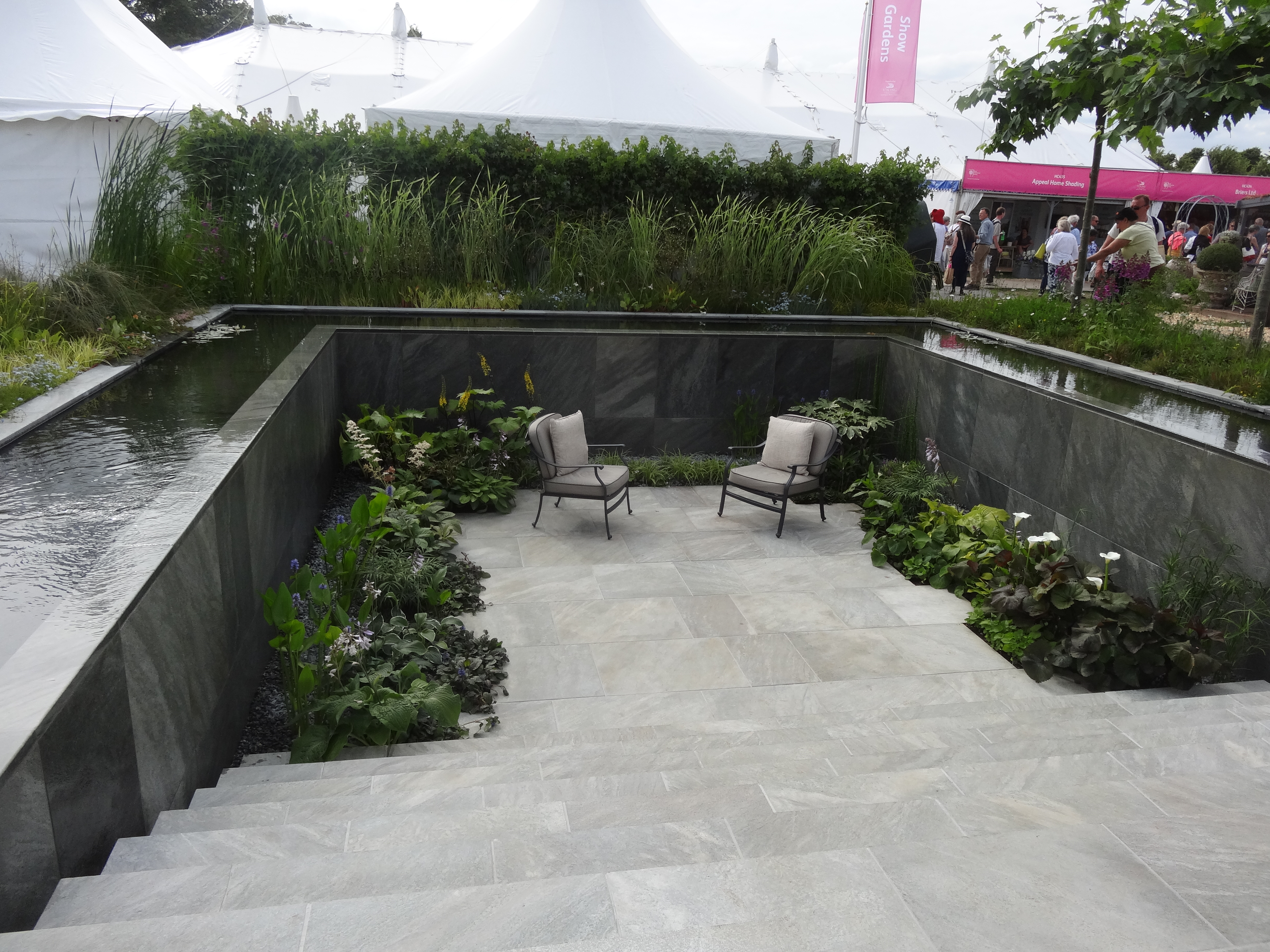
Gardens exhibited at the Hampton Court Palace Flower Show, 2016

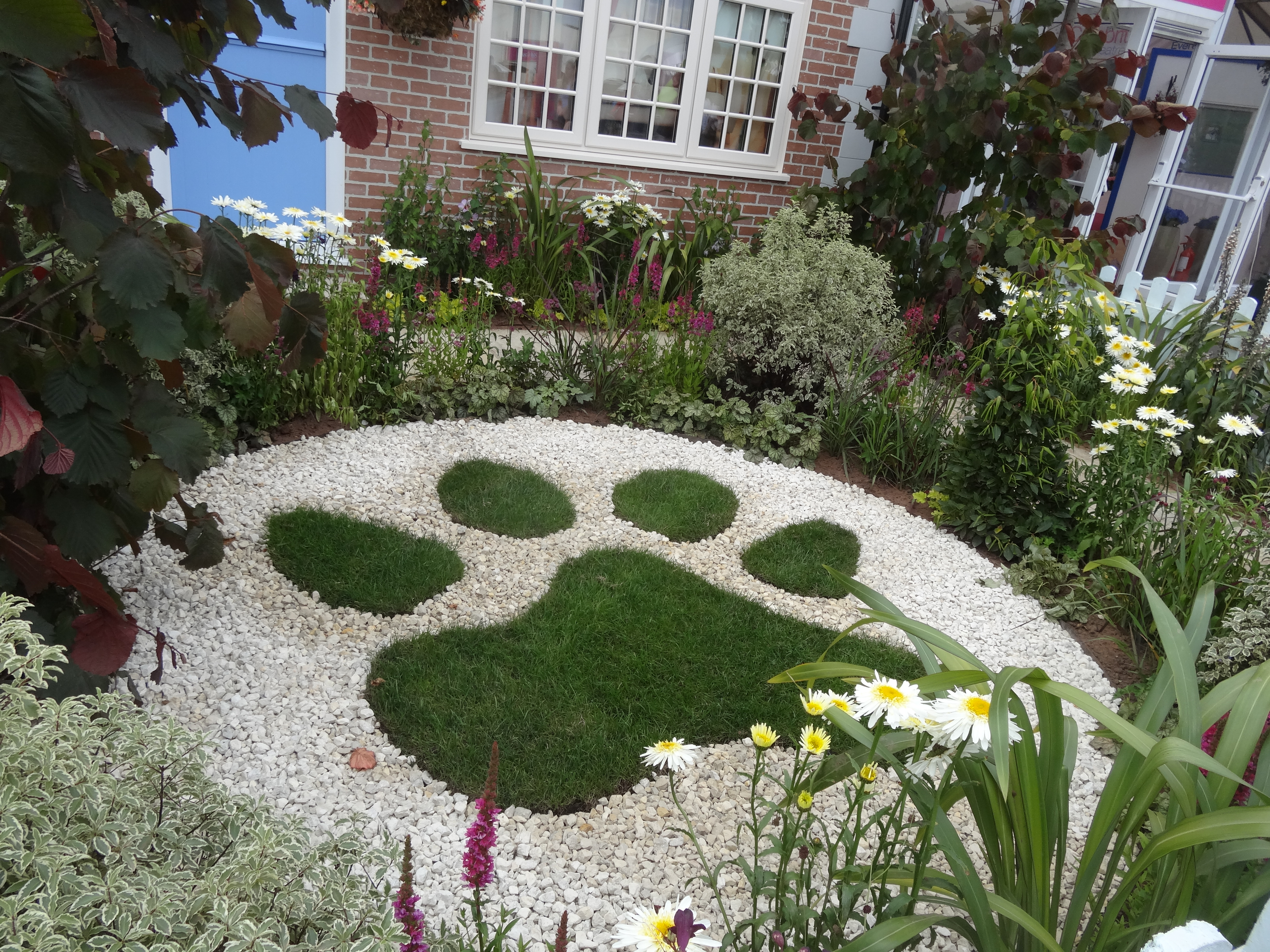
Show gardens displayed at the Hampton Court Palace Flower Show in 2016

== See also ==
- Royal Horticultural Society
- Chelsea Flower Show
- Tatton Park Flower Show
- HM Prison Leyhill, whose award-winning entries inspired the 2000 film Greenfingers
