= List of hammered dulcimer players =

Noted musicians who play the hammered dulcimer include the following:

== A ==
- Matthew Abelson
- Azam Ali (santur)

== B ==
- Billy Bennington
- Tarun Bhattacharya (santoor)
- Blue Man Group
- Basia Bulat (occasionally, main instrument is autoharp)
- Botanist

== C ==
- Evan Carawan (multi-instrumentalist)
- Guy Carawan (multi-instrumentalist)
- Dorothy Carter (multi-instrumentalist)
- Mitzie Collins
- Russell Cook
- Jimmy Cooper
- Jim Couza

== D ==
- Malcolm Dalglish
- Constance Demby
- Toby Driver

== F ==
- Chris Funk (multi-instrumentalist, plays occasionally)

== G ==
- Lisa Gerrard (yangqin)

== H ==
- Dana Hamilton
- Sue Harris
- Steve Hogarth (multi-instrumentalist, mainly keyboard player)
- Brenda Hunter

== K ==
- Ardavan Kamkar (santur)

== L ==
- Dan Landrum
- Laraaji
- James Lascelles
- Arjen Lucassen

== M ==
- Tom MacKenzie
- John McCutcheon
- Parviz Meshkatian (santur)
- Ion Miu (cimbalom)
- Rich Mullins (multi-instrumentalist)

== N ==
- New Victory Band (Christine Coe)
- Joanna Newsom (mainly known for harp)
- Simon Nicol (mainly known for guitar)

== P ==
- Carl Palmer (in Still...You Turn Me On)
- Chet Parker
- Faramarz Payvar (santur)
- Neil Peart (mainly known for drums)
- Brendan Perry (yangqin)

== R ==
- John Rea
- Sam Rizzetta

== S ==
- Maggie Sansone
- Timothy Seaman
- Rahul Sharma (santoor)
- Shivkumar Sharma (santoor)
- Geoff Smith
- Bill Spence

== T ==
- Richard Thompson (mainly known for guitar)
- Trapezoid

== V ==
- Paul Van Arsdale

== W ==
- Collin Walcott (mainly known for sitar, tabla and percussion)
- Joemy Wilson
- Steven Wilson (mainly known for guitar and keyboard)
