= Celebrity gardener =

Gardeners who have achieved fame through their pioneering innovations, writing or, more often, their television personas, may be classed as celebrity gardeners.

The writing of Helena Rutherfurd Ely, C. Z. Guest and Esther Deans brought them enough fame for them to be considered celebrity gardeners.

In England, the Royal Horticultural Society has described both Alan Titchmarsh and Monty Don as celebrity gardeners.

== Notable gardeners on radio, television and social media ==
- Craig Allison – host of The Carefree Gardener
- Chris Beardshaw
- Matthew Biggs – Gardeners' Question Time
- Don Burke – host of Burke's Backyard; producer of Backyard Blitz
- Danny Clarke - British horticulturist, host of BBC series The Instant Gardener
- James Underwood Crockett – original host of The Victory Garden
- Peter Cundall – host of ABC TV's Gardening Australia
- Charlie Dimmock
- Harry Dodson – head gardener for the BBC television show The Victorian Kitchen Garden
- David Domoney – gardener on ITV1's Love Your Garden and ITV's This Morning
- Monty Don – host of BBC2's Gardeners' World
- Art Drysdale – Canadian gardener with various broadcasts
- Jamie Durie – host of axed show Backyard Blitz on Channel Nine; now host of Australia's Best Backyards on Channel Seven
- Kevin Espiritu - creator of Epic Gardening Youtube Channel
- Bob Flowerdew – Gardeners Question Time
- Alan Gardner – British Channel4 series The Autistic Gardener
- Diarmuid Gavin – garden designer; television host of Homefront in the Garden
- Pippa Greenwood – Gardeners' Question Time
- James Hewitt
- Ivan Hričovský – gardener on the Slovak Television and Radio show Farmer's revue
- Carol Klein – BBC2's Gardeners' World
- Roy Lancaster
- Sarah Raven – BBC2's Gardeners' World
- P. Allen Smith
- Joe Swift – BBC2's Gardeners' World
- Percy Thrower – Britain's first celebrity gardener
- Alan Titchmarsh – writer for BBC Gardeners' World magazine; celebrity television gardener
- Brian Welch – freelance celebrity gardener
- James Wong – BBC science presenter and obsessive foodie grower

== See also ==
- List of professional gardeners
