= Bill Spence (musician) =

American musician (1940–2019)

- Born: August 12, 1940; Iowa City, Iowa, United States
- Died: February 7, 2019 (aged 78) Albany, New York, United States
- Occupations: Instrumentalist, vocalist
- Instruments: Hammered dulcimer, guitar
- Website: billspencemusic.com

Bill Spence (August 12, 1940 - February 7, 2019) was a hammered dulcimer player from New York.

== Music ==
Spence began playing the hammered dulcimer after hearing Howie Mitchell at the 1969 Fox Hollow Festival in Petersburgh, New York. He made his first dulcimer following a plan in Mitchell's book. The only hammered dulcimer recordings available at the time were by Mitchell and another player, Chet Parker on the Folkways label. Spence developed his own style, working out tunes he heard on recordings of other instruments.

In 1970, Spence helped form Fennig's All-Stars, which featured his hammered dulcimer as the lead instrument. The group made its first recording, The Hammered Dulcimer in 1973, using a two-track recorder in Spence's living room. The album was widely distributed (over 60,000 copies have been sold), and became very influential in the early part of the hammered dulcimer revival. One of the cuts from the record (Gaspé Reel and Fiddle Head Reel) was used as the theme for the popular PBS series Crockett's Victory Garden. The album was also designated as a "Recording of Special Merit" by Stereo Review magazine.

The Hammered Dulcimer marked the beginning of Spence's own record label, Front Hall Records. In addition to several further albums by Spence and Fennig's All-Stars, the label released albums by other folk performers, including John McCutcheon, Walt Michael and Company, Louis Killen, and Alistair Anderson. Spence and his wife, Andy, also operated Andy's Front Hall, a mail-order business selling instruments, recordings, instructional materials, and related items. In 2005, the business was scaled down from a full-service operation.

== Biography ==
Born in Iowa City, Iowa, on August 12, 1940, Spence graduated from the University of Iowa in 1962 with a degree in communications. He worked for the Army Security Agency until 1965, and then at the State University of New York at Albany as an audio-visual and computer graphics specialist until retiring in 1998. He lived in Voorheesville, New York, until his death on February 7, 2019, in Albany, New York.

== Discography ==
- The Hammered Dulcimer, Front Hall Records FHR-01, 1973
- Saturday Night In The Provinces, Front Hall Records FHR-05, 1975
- The Hammered Dulcimer Strikes Again, Front Hall Records FHR-010, 1977
- Dookin' For Apples (with Alistair Anderson), Front Hall Records FHR-08, 1979
- Fennigmania, Front Hall Records FHR-024, 1981
- The Hammered Dulcimer, Front Hall Records FHR-302CD (compilation of FHR-01 and FHR-05), 1990
- The Hammered Dulcimer Returns!, Front Hall Records FHR041CD, 1992
- The Hammered Dulcimer Strikes Again & Fennigmania, Front Hall Records FHR-303CD (compilation of FHR-010 and FHR-024), 2000
- The Hammered Dulcimer Rides Again, Front Hall Records FHR-305CD, 2018
