= Louis Raymond =

Louis Raymond may refer to:

- Louis Raymond (horticulturalist) (born 1954), American landscape designer
- Louis Raymond (tennis) (1895–1962), South African tennis player
