= Kid Pan Alley =

American non-profit organization

- Type: Non-profit organization
- Industry: Nonprofit, Education
- Founded: 1999
- Headquarters: Washington, Virginia
- Key people: Paul Reisler, Founder
- Website: www.kidpanalley.org

Kid Pan Alley is an American 501(c)(3) nonprofit organization based in Washington, Virginia, founded by Paul Reisler of the band Trapezoid in 1999 that provides group songwriting residency programs to children in schools across the United States. Kid Pan Alley's mission is "to inspire and empower children to work together to become creators of their own music and to rekindle creativity as a core value in education". Reisler guides the students through the group songwriting process and together they complete the songs in two class periods.

Kid Pan Alley instructors work with students as they brainstorm ideas, vote on the song's subject, and create lyrics and melodies with the instructors until the song is completed. Each class performs their song in front of their school and community at the end of the week. The program is known for promoting community awareness of the arts while creating opportunities for children to explore their creativity through songwriting in a school setting. They have released six compilation studio albums of songs written with children including Tidal Wave Of Song in 2001, Kid Pan Alley Nashville in 2006, I Used To Know The Names Of All The Stars in 2008 and One Little Song Can Change the World in 2017, Best Friends in 2019, and Maybe by Next year (2021). These albums feature artists such as Amy Grant, Sissy Spacek, Pinchas Zukerman, Raul Malo, Suzy Bogguss, Nashville Chamber Orchestra, Delbert McClinton, Kix Brooks, John McCutcheon, Bill Harley, and Cracker. Kid Pan Alley has written over 2,800 songs with over 80,000 children and their albums have won two Parent's Choice Awards, a WAMMIE award, a NAPPA Gold Award, and have also received one Grammy Award Nomination.

Kid Pan Alley also has created two musicals: Bouncin' (2017) and The Talented Clementine (2019, based on the book by Sarah Pennypacker). Reisler wrote the script and songs for both musicals drawing from the Kid Pan Alley catalog of songs.

== History ==
Kid Pan Alley started in 1999 in Rappahannock County, Virginia, when Reisler conducted the first Kid Pan Alley residency with a local elementary school where he composed over 50 songs with 600 children. Shortly after, Reisler invited professional musicians from the county to record 19 of the 50 songs, in their own style, to be featured on Kid Pan Alley's first album release, Tidal Wave Of Song. In the following years, Kid Pan Alley expanded into many other states including Hawai'i, California, and Colorado. Reisler chose the name Kid Pan Alley as a play on words derived from New York City's Tin Pan Alley.
