= Trapezoid (band) =

American folk music group

Trapezoid is an American folk music group led by Paul Reisler. Founded in 1975 by Sam Rizzetta and Reisler, they began as a quartet of hammer dulcimer players. Two of the four played the traditional hammer dulcimer, while the other two played baritone and treble hammer dulcimers specially designed by Rizzetta. The name of the band reflects the shape of the hammer dulcimer. Since 1975, the group's membership and instrumentation changed repeatedly, always with Paul Reisler as a member. Their sound has been described as a "plinking and plunking, buzzing, sweeping, ringing, droning, and wailing acoustic construction" and as "a delightful musical melange" by the New York Times.

In 2004 and 2005, the 1984 lineup that recorded Winter Solstice with John McCutcheon - minus fiddler Freyda Epstein, who was killed in 2003 in a car accident - reunited with McCutcheon to perform acoustic concerts, called the Winter Solstice tour.

Reisler has gone on to form a new band, Paul Reisler and A Thousand Questions, and to form the Kid Pan Alley children's songwriting project.

== Discography ==
=== Studio recordings ===
- Trapezoid (Skyline Records, 1975) OCLC Number: 15012240; Featuring Paul Reisler, guitars and hammered dulcimer (bass); Sam Rizzetta, hammered dulcimer and mountain dulcimer; Pete Vigour, hammered dulcimer, banjo, pennywhistle, and vocals; and Paul Yeaton, Dulcetta hammered dulcimer (soprano) and mandolin.
- Three Forks of Cheat (Rounder, 1979) OCLC Number: 7055047; Featuring Paul Reisler, guitars and hammered dulcimer (soprano); Sam Rizzetta, hammered dulcimer and mountain dulcimer; Tina Liden-Jones, banjo, mandolin, dulcimer, and concertina; Ralph Gordon, bass, cello, and dulcimer (bass); Stuart Light, vocals, fiddle, dulcimer (bass), guitar, and pedal steel guitar.
- Now and Then (Flying Fish, 1980) OCLC Number: 26137155; Recorded at Bias Studios, Springfield, VA (engineering by Bill McElroy, production by David Essig) Featuring Lorraine Duisit, vocals, mandola, bowed psaltery, and mandolin; Freyda Epstein, vocals, violin and viola; Ralph Gordon, vocals, cello and bass; and Paul Reisler, hammered dulcimer and guitar.
- Another Country (Flying Fish, 1982) OCLC Number: 13947009; Recorded at Bias Studios, Springfield, VA (engineering and production by Bill McElroy). Featuring Lorraine Duisit, vocals, mandola, bowed psaltery, and guitar; Freyda Epstein, vocals and violin; Ralph Gordon, cello and bass; and Paul Reisler, hammered dulcimer and guitar.
- Cool of the Day (Sugar Hill, 1985) OCLC Number: 26121328; Recorded at Bias Studios, Springfield, VA (engineering and production by Bill McElroy). Featuring Lorraine Duisit, vocals, mandola, mandolin, bowed psaltery, and harp; Freyda Epstein, vocals and violin; Ralph Gordon, cello, bass, bass guitar; and Paul Reisler, hammered dulcimer and guitar. Special guests include Glen Velez (bodhran, vocal harmony) and Howard Levy (harmonica, pan flute, pan pipes, piano, soprano saxophone, and synthesizer).
- Moon Run (Narada/MCA, 1990) OCLC Number: 22689518; Featuring Paul Reisler, guitars, hammered dulcimer, and autoharp; Bobby Read, keyboards, winds, and percussion; Cheryl Hurwitz, violins and vocals; Peter Mark Prince, fretless bass; Lorraine Duisit, harp; Tim Valdes, percussion, drums, and mandolin; and Anne Louise White vocals and keyboards.
- Remembered Ways (Azure, 1994) OCLC Number: 31140808; Featuring Paul Reisler, guitars and hammered dulcimer; Bobby Read, keyboards, winds, and percussion; Cecil Hooker, violin; Martha Sandefer, vocals, rhythm guitar and a bunch of Trapezoid's favorite musician friends, including: Ysaye Barnwell, Howard Levy, Mike Auldridge, Lorraine Duisit, Peter Mark Prince and others.

=== Compilations ===
- Long Time Down This Road (Azure, 1995) OCLC Number: 34786360; A 20th anniversary retrospective mastered by David Glasser featuring 65 minutes of music including four previously unreleased recordings and ten Trapezoid favorites. Does not include tracks from the first Trapezoid album.
- Hammered Dulcimer Quartet & Stringband (Rizzetta Music, 1999) Digital re-issue of the first Trapezoid album plus new bonus cuts featuring Sam Rizetta, hammered dulcimers, fretted dulcimer; Paul Reisler, bass hammered dulcimer, guitar; Pete Vigour, hammered dulcimer, banjo and pennywhistle; Paul Yeaton, Dulcetta (soprano hammered dulcimer) and mandolin.

=== Other recordings ===
- Watch Out! with Holly Near (Redwood, 1984) Produced by John McCutcheon and featuring Trapezoid: Paul Reisler, Ralph Gordon, Freyda Epstein, and Lorraine Duisit.
- Winter Solstice with John McCutcheon (Rounder, 1986) Recorded at Bias Studios, Springfield, VA (engineering and production by Bill McElroy). Featuring the Washington Bach Consort and Trapezoid: Sam Rizzetta, Paul Reisler, Freyda Epstein, Lorraine Duisit, Ralph Gordon, Howard Levy, and Paul Reisler.
- Generations with Sally Rogers (Flying Fish, 1989) Produced by Paul Reisler and featuring Pete Kennedy and Trapezoid: Bobby Read, Howard Levy, Anne Louise White, Cheryl Hurwitz, and Paul Reisler.
- I'll Be There: Songs for Jobs with Justice with Si Kahn (Flying Fish, 1989) Produced by Paul Reisler and featuring Trapezoid: Bobby Read, Howard Levy, Anne Louise White, Cheryl Hurwitz, Tim Valdes, and Paul Reisler.
- Dissin’ the Diz with John McCutcheon (Azure, 1994) consisting of three songs to benefit the Piedmont Environmental Council.
