= Stockbridge School of Agriculture =

Agricultural school of University of Massachusetts Amherst

- College of Natural Sciences; University of Massachusetts Amherst
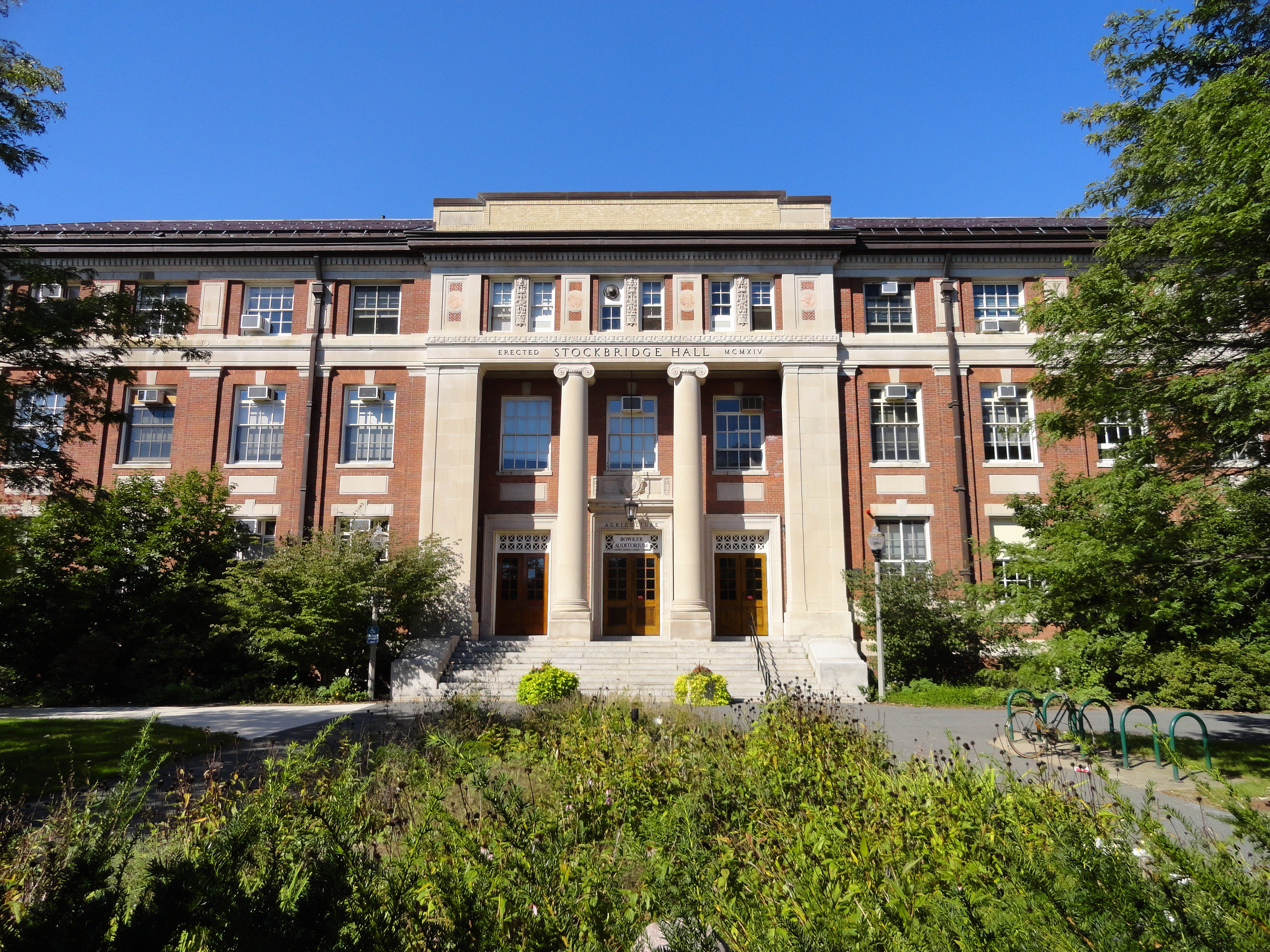
- Stockbridge Hall

- Seal
- Location: Amherst, Massachusetts
- Coordinates: 42.392252°N 72.529373°W
- Motto: "Give Your Best To Dear Old Stockbridge. Body, heart, soul."
- Established: 1870 Short Courses; 1892 First Official Two-Year Courses; 1918 Separate Institution
- Named for: Levi Stockbridge
- Colors: Blue and Gold school, unofficial Maroon and White university
- Gender: Co-educational
- Administrator: Wesley R. Autio
- Dean: Tricia Serio
- Undergraduates: 311
- Postgraduates: 36
- Fellows: 31
- Website: http://stockbridge.cns.umass.edu/

The Stockbridge School of Agriculture is a constituent college of the University of Massachusetts Amherst. It offers associate, bachelor's, and graduate degrees related to agriculture. It was founded as part of the Massachusetts Agricultural College (now University of Massachusetts Amherst) in 1918.

The school's main facility and school symbol is Stockbridge Hall, named after Levi Stockbridge, a founder of Massachusetts Agricultural College and its first professor of agriculture; however, its faculty occupies various buildings on the University of Massachusetts campus, including Agricultural Engineering, Bowditch, Clark, Fernald, French, Stockbridge, and West Experiment Station. Research, education, and extension activities occur at the UMass Cold Spring Orchard Research & Education Center, the Hadley Farm (Stockbridge Stables), the Joseph Troll Turf Research Center, the UMass Vegetable & Agronomy Research Farm, and the CNS Greenhouses.

== Degrees ==
The following Associate of Science degrees are available at Stockbridge:

- Arboriculture and Community Forest Management
- Equine Management
- Sustainable Food & Farming
- Sustainable Horticulture
- Landscape Contracting
- Turfgrass Management

The following Bachelor of Science Degrees are available:

- Sustainable Food & Farming
- Sustainable Horticulture
- Turfgrass Science & Management
- Plant, Soil, & Insect Sciences

The following graduate degrees are offered:

- M.S. and Ph.D. in Plant Biology
- M.S. and Ph.D. in Organismic & Evolutionary Biology
- M.S. and Ph.D. in Molecular & Cellular Biology
- M.S. in Soil Science

== Athletics ==
Stockbridge has two National Junior College Athletic Association (NJCAA) teams: basketball and golf. As a two–year school, its students are not allowed by the NCAA to play on varsity teams. Stockbridge teams compete against small four-year schools, preparatory schools, and community colleges. Stockbridge students may try out for the Intercollegiate Horse Show Association equestrian team and Intercollegiate Dressage Association team. These teams compete throughout the year with other colleges in the Northeast. Students may also take advantage of many noncompetitive recreational opportunities or participate in the University of Massachusetts' intramural program, one of the largest in the East.

== Greek life ==
Alpha Tau Gamma is the social and academic fraternity of the Stockbridge School of Agriculture. Their Chapter House is located at 118 Sunset Avenue on several acres of land near the Southwest dormitories. There has been at several time throughout the history of the Stockbridge School of Agriculture a sorority Sigma Sigma Alpha. They are currently not active on campus.

== Notable alumni ==
- James Underwood Crockett, producer and host of the public television show The Victory Garden

== Accreditation ==
Stockbridge is accredited through the New England Association of Schools and Colleges
