= Epic Gardening =

American gardening brand

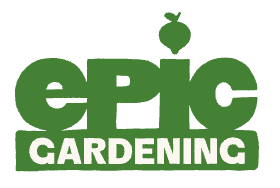

YouTube information
- Channels: Epic Gardening; Epic Homesteading
- Years active: 2013–present
- Genre: Gardening brand
- Subscribers: 4.12 million
- Views: 965 million
- Last updated: 18 Sept 2026
- Website: www.epicgardening.com

Epic Gardening is an American gardening brand with a YouTube channel operated and founded by Kevin Espiritu (born August 1987) since 2013. As of September 2026, the channel has 815 videos, 4.12 million subscribers and 965 million views.

== History ==
Espiritu grew up in Rancho Peñasquitos, San Diego. In order to pay for college, Espiritu made money playing online poker. In 2013, he graduated from the University of California at Santa Barbara receiving a degree in accounting after having been undeclared. To combat his addiction to video games after college graduation, Espiritu's mom suggested he and his younger brother take up gardening as a hobby.

Espiritu's first video on Epic Gardening was uploaded in February of 2013, focusing on hydroponics systems. In 2016, he made the decision to leave his position at a book subscription service to cultivate food in backyards while simultaneously developing a gardening blog as a full-time job. As his following expanded, he ventured into YouTube and various other social media platforms, culminating in the establishment of an e-commerce website. He documented online the conversion of his San Diego residence into an eco-friendly smart urban homestead: raising chickens for eggs, reusing rainwater and greywater, composting food and yard scraps, and installing solar panels.

In 2019, Espiritu was selected by Timberland as one of their 8 "Heroes for Nature" in an international sustainability campaign. In 2021, Espiritu was featured on the Today Show on multiple occasions throughout the year.

In January 2022, TCG invested $17.5 million in Epic Gardening. At the end of 2022, Epic Gardening reached 2 million subscribers. The company now has over 80 employees. In 2022, Epic Gardening added Jacques Lyakov of Jacques in the Garden as a guest star on the channel. In January 2023, Epic Gardening acquired Botanical Interests, a seed selling company based in Broomfield, Colorado.

== Bibliography ==
- Field Guide to Urban Gardening (Cool Springs Press, May 2019)
- Grow Bag Gardening (Cool Springs Press, March 2021)
- Epic Homesteading: Your Guide to Self-Sufficiency on a Modern, High-Tech, Backyard Homestead (Cool Springs Press, January 2024)

== See also ==
- Celebrity gardener
