= Brenda Hunter =

American musician and composer

Brenda J. Hunter is an American musician and composer best known as a hammered dulcimer player. She also plays Irish fiddle, Celtic harp, and classical piano, with the latter influence evident in her particular style on the dulcimer and harp. She won the National Championship in 1995 at the Walnut Valley Festival in Winfield, Kansas, receiving as her prize a Masterworks hammered dulcimer built by Russell Cook. She has also played a Rick Thum instrument, and currently uses a Nick Blanton Compact model on stage. She performs and teaches nationally on hammered dulcimer, also performs on solo Celtic harp, plays fiddle and hammered dulcimer with Celtic trio Banshee in the Kitchen, and was previously with Celtic duo Briar Rose.

== Discography ==
=== With Briar Rose ===
- 1995 - Christmas Collage
- 1997 - The Captive Maiden

=== With Banshee in the Kitchen ===
- 2002 - If We Were Us
- 2003 - Catching the Mooncoin (featuring the hammered dulcimer)
- 2005 - Even Hotter Water
- 2006 - Invite the Light: World Music for Winter
- 2008 - Live at Painted Sky

=== Other ===
- 2000 - Mel Bay Presents 2000 hammered dulcimer compilation book and CD
- 2006 - National Champions compilation CD
- 2011 - Skyride: Hammered Dulcimer and Guitar (EP with Mary Tulin)
