= Louis Raymond (horticulturalist) =

American landscape and garden designer (born 1954)

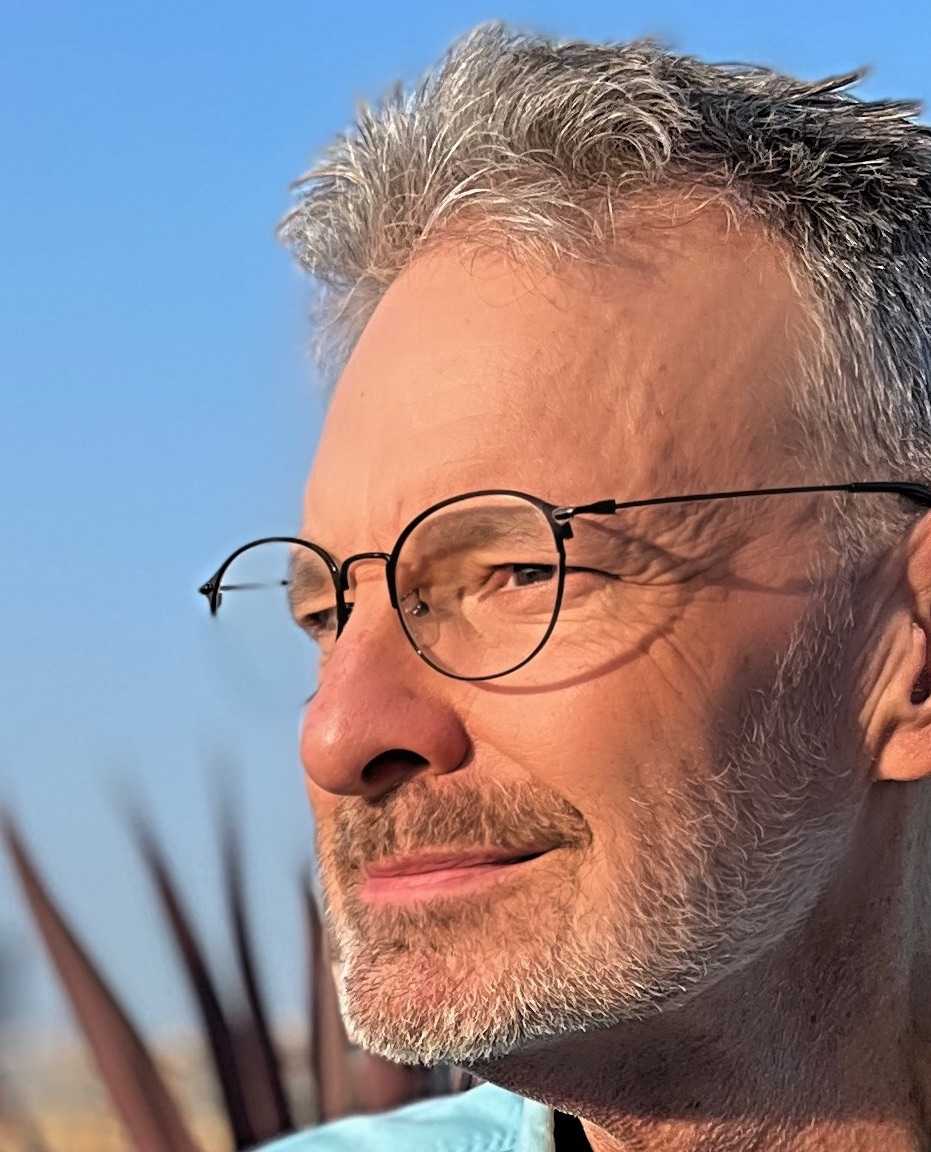
- Raymond in 2020
- Born: Dale Louis McKinley; March 23, 1954 (age 72); Erie, Pennsylvania, U.S.
- Education: (BA) in Chemistry, Lehigh University (BA) in Piano, (BA) in Voice, Peabody Institute of Johns Hopkins University
- Occupations: Development director & gardener
- Spouse(s): Richard Ericson, III

Louis Raymond (born March 23, 1954), is a landscape and garden designer, consultant, and steward. An American landscape designer, he manages a solo design-build practice. He consults on residential, resort, and exhibition garden and landscape design in the United States and abroad.

== Early life ==
Raymond was born Dale Louis McKinley in Erie, Pennsylvania, on March 23, 1954. He has been interested in plants and gardens since pre-school. He obtained a Bachelor of Arts degree in chemistry from Lehigh University, and attended medical school for two years. He then studied music, obtaining two more Bachelor of Arts degrees, in piano and in voice, from the Peabody Institute of Johns Hopkins University. He performed as an opera singer in greater Washington, DC, and then, under management, in NYC, where he adopted the stage name of Louis Raymond. By the mid-1980s, Raymond had retired from the stage to concentrate on garden design.

== Career ==
In his horticultural career, Raymond has been active in many flowershows. He was the show designer—the head of exhibition gardens—for the Boston flowershow for six years, when it was under the auspices of the Massachusetts Horticultural Society. He has judged at the Boston, Philadelphia, and Worcester flowershows. He has exhibited at the Newport, Rhode Island, and Providence, Rhode Island, flowershows. He lectured widely on horticulture, the history of garden and landscape design and their intersection with popular culture, and his own projects and personal gardens.

== Works & Press ==
In a feature in The Providence Journal, Louis & his personal gardens were introduced in advance of their being featured as a studio tour for the September 2016 edition of Design Week. Louis provided commentary as well as pictures of plants from his own garden for a June 12, 2014 feature by The Washington Post garden writer, Adrian Higgins, on gardening so as not to attract bees. One of his projects in Rhode Island was featured in the July/August, 2013 issue of Design New England. One of his projects in Connecticut was the subject of a feature in the September/October, 2012 issue of Design New England. Another of his projects in Connecticut was the subject of a feature in the June, 2012 issue of Good Housekeeping. One of his projects in New York City was featured in USA Today in 2002. An oceanfront project in New England was a House & Garden (magazine) cover story. A project in Providence, Rhode Island, was featured in Metropolitan Home. One of his country-house projects was featured in the same magazine in 2001.

Design New England has published two features on Raymond's own gardens.

A designer showhouse project was featured in The Boston Globe in 2001. The showhouse garden was a collaboration with noted found object sculptor Jill Nooney, creator of Bedrock Gardens, in Lee, New Hampshire.

People, Places, and Plants published a feature on his work as designer at the Boston flowershow. A feature in The Boston Globe highlighted the 1999 edition of the Boston Flowershow, Raymond's first as show designer.

A residential project in Providence, Rhode Island, was featured in the Rhode Island Monthly, which had earlier featured a three-season garden designed specifically for that publication. Two features appeared in The Providence Journal on Raymond's first signature project, the gardens of Theatre-By-the-Sea, in Matunuck, Rhode Island. A feature on one of Raymond's projects that celebrated horticulture that deer don't nibble appeared in "The Narragansett Times".

== Charitable service ==
For over twenty years, Raymond has been active in the Southside Community Land Trust, a Providence-based organization that champions urban agriculture and sustainable, affordable access to healthy food. He has been Board President for over ten years; in July 2019, he welcomed a new Board President, and resumed a regular Board seat. In 2021, Raymond became Southside's first-ever Board Member Emeritus.

== Personal life ==
On August 3, 2013, Raymond and his life partner of forty years, Richard Ericson, a theater and media director and producer, were married in Lenox, Massachusetts.
