= Edible Communities =

Edible Communities is a for profit business, which groups independently owned local food magazines in North America, numbering 81 as of June 2013. Edible Communities is an umbrella publishing and information services company that creates community-based, local-foods publications in culinary regions throughout the United States and Canada.

== History ==
It was founded by Tracey Ryder and Carole Topalian in 2002 in Ojai, California. Gourmet described them as "gorgeous, intelligent locavores of the magazine world." As of 2013 consists of 90 Edible magazines in North America. Each magazine has culinary news tailored to the local area. Local publishers pay a licensing fee and a royalty fee to Edible Communities, Inc.

Edible Communities won the 2011 James Beard Foundation Award for Publication of the Year.

In January 2013, Edible Communities launched an iPhone app. In the same year, Edible Communities in partnership with PBS re-launched the show The Victory Garden as "The Victory Garden: Edible Feast." It lasted two seasons.
