= Levi Stockbridge =

American soil scientist (1820–1904)

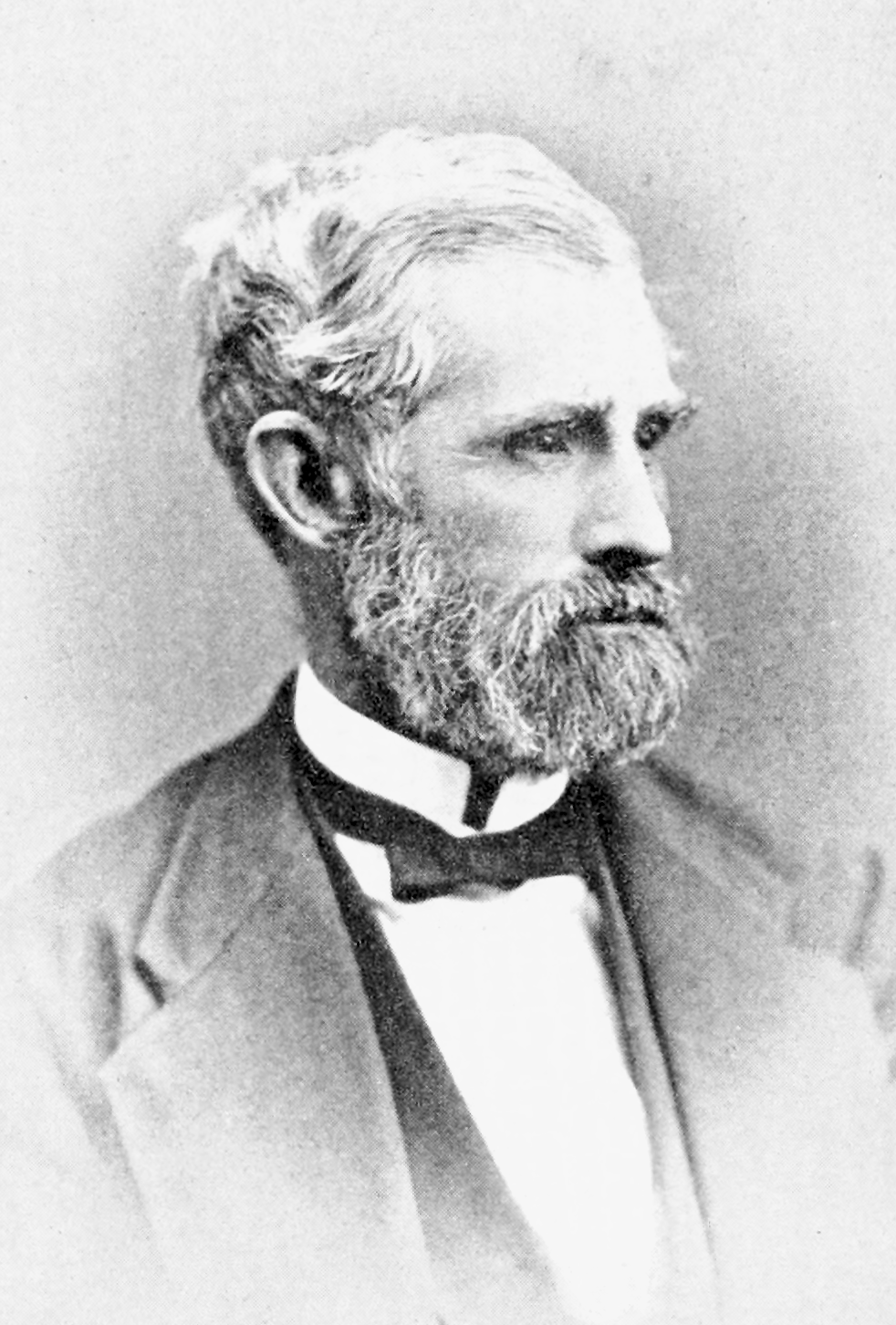
- Levi Stockbridge c. 1880

President of the Massachusetts Agricultural College (now the University of Massachusetts Amherst)
- In office 1876, 1880 – 1882

Member of the Massachusetts House of Representatives
- In office 1855, 1870, 1883 – 1884

Member of the Massachusetts Senate, Hampshire and Franklin district
- In office 1865–1866

Presidential Elector, 1872

Personal details
- Born: March 13, 1820 Hadley, Massachusetts, U.S.
- Died: May 2, 1904 (aged 84) Amherst, Massachusetts, U.S.
- Party: Greenback Party

Levi Stockbridge (March 13, 1820 – May 2, 1904) was a farmer and scientist from Hadley, Massachusetts. He was instrumental in the early history of the Massachusetts Agricultural College now known as the University of Massachusetts Amherst.

== Biography ==
Stockbridge held the following positions with the college:

- Farm Superintendent: 1867-1869
- Professor: 1867-1879
- Acting President: 1876
- Fifth President: 1880-1882

He held patents for pioneering experiments in: fertilizer development, nutrient leaching and soil mulching. In 1876 he published Experiments in Feeding Plants. Stockbridge served three terms in the Massachusetts State Legislature, 12 years on the state board of agriculture and for 32 years was a state cattle commissioner. In 1880 he ran for Congress on the Labor-Greenback Party ticket and lost.

The Boltwood-Stockbridge House in Amherst, Massachusetts, is probably the first house built in Amherst and is certainly the oldest remaining and was originally built as the home of Samuel Boltwood. Eventually the Boltwood house and the 111-acre (0.45 km^{2}) farm surrounding the house became part of the Mass Agricultural College. Henry Flagg French, first president of MAC, resided there until he resigned in 1867, after which Stockbridge made the house his residence and office. Stockbridge Hall, built in 1915 to house the Department of Agriculture, and the Stockbridge School of Agriculture at the University of Massachusetts Amherst also bear his name.

The town of Stockbridge, Georgia, is also named after him.

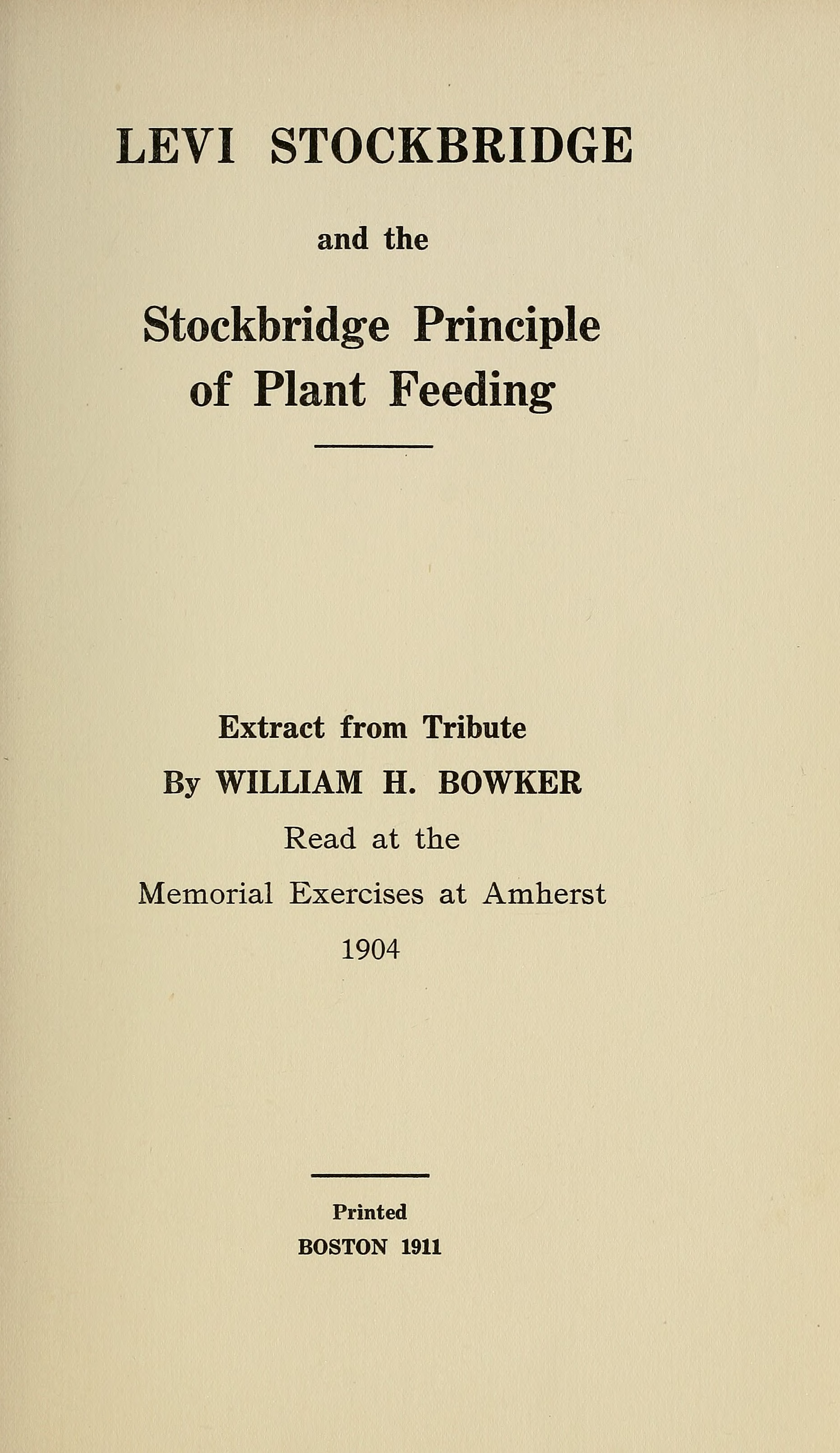
William Henry Bowker, Levi Stockbridge and the Stockbridge principle of plant feeding, 1911

== Selected works ==
- Investigations on Rainfall, Percolation and Evaporation of Water (1879)
