= Sustainability advertising =

Communications strategy

Sustainability advertising is communications geared towards promoting social, economic and environmental benefits (sustainability) of products, services or actions through paid advertising in media in order to encourage responsible behavior of consumers.

== Definition ==
Conventional advertising is part of the promotion of products and services.

Sustainability advertising is used to advert customers to sustainable products, services and actions. It is not only focused on environmental issues and the product or service itself, but includes communication about the entire life cycle of the product. It furthermore informs about the sustainability of the producing company and communicates desirable lifestyles changes to consumers. Advertising in general is a one-way communication through mass media and is used to create brand recognition, brand knowledge and some brand preference. Sustainability advertising contributes to all three pillars of triple bottom line: economic development, environmental protection and social responsibility.

== Objectives ==
Whenever an advertisement campaign is developed and launched as a marketing strategy for a sustainable product or service, it must be aligned to the objectives defined by the company in the context of sustainability. Some of the common objectives of marketing communications are: generation of awareness, informing consumers, reminding consumers, persuading consumers, reassuring consumers, motivating and rewarding consumers and connecting with them. These are the basis for more specific objectives of sustainability advertising with the emphasis on environmental and social aspects.

The United Nations Environment Programme (UNEP) has developed documents that give insights about the objectives of the sustainability advertising. They include:

1. "Ensuring truth in advertising – the advertising codes provided and supported by the advertising industry and other mechanisms to ensure that claims can be substantiated, to prevent consumers from being misled". This is related to the objectives of informing consumers and reassuring them whenever there is misleading critics or arguments against a particular product, service or implemented action.
2. "Ensuring ethical behavior from advertisers, so that messages are legal, decent, honest and truthful". Advertisement should not include attempts of greenwashing and reference to false social responsibility claims.
3. "Ensuring that all sectors of society, including women, minorities, the elderly and children are sensitively portrayed." This "is associated with the challenge of sustainability advertising to address and "connect" with different audiences through a mass media message".
4. "How advertising agencies, and the advertisers themselves, operate. As with all other sectors, organizations in the advertising industry need to address their direct effects on the environment and society, and the need for environmental management systems, reporting and corporate social responsibility programs." This area refers to the coherence needed whenever a sustainability message in advertising is set. The advertising message and the behavior of the company should be consistent to create trust and credibility.

== Background ==
The conventional marketing mix concept was gradually developed during the economic miracle right after World War II and included the 4P's model, introduced around 1960. This model, in which the promotion of products with advertising as one of its main tools plays an important role, was helpful for many industries in many markets." However, the market situation changed: consumers became more aware of the social and ecological implications of their purchases and at the same time inherent attributes like efficiency and cost effectiveness, health and safety, symbolism and status needed to be highlighted by companies in order to remain competitive in the market. The companies have been adapting to the changes and now move towards "relationship marketing focused more on communicating with the consumer" rather than just promoting the product. They use advertising, along with other activities and resources, as a tool to inform the consumers and stakeholders about the sustainability solutions the company provides and about the company as a whole.

Of the three pillars, the environmental dimension has captivated the most attention and has a large body of marketing literature that is not discussed in social sustainability. "The relationship between marketing and the environment has been examined since the early 1970s". First, the idea of ecological marketing was developed and mainly centered in the "depletion of energy and non-energy natural resources and the pollution created as by-product of production and consumption." "The first tentative steps of non-polluting industry and first uses of nature in advertising arose" and were later accompanied by an intensive mediatization of environmental issues in the 1980s. For example: the discovery of the 'hole in the ozone layer' in 1985 and Chernobyl in 1986. By this time, green marketing and environmental marketing concepts were built up and elements from the product life cycle assessment (associated with environmental marketing) as well as destruction of ecosystems and poverty in developing countries (associated with green marketing) were considered in the advertising campaigns.

Lately, the concept of sustainability advertising has evolved as it is defined in the first part of this article. It has encountered critics, and limitations, but also challenges that are guiding the companies, governments and organizations to the implementation of more holistic and sustainable practices in the process of providing products and services worldwide.

== Information carriers ==
Information carriers of marketing messages are mainly mainstream media like national television, national radio and print. Those media are also engaged in sustainability promotion, because they are central players in building consumers culture. Within radio, print or television campaigns sustainability advertisements are pointing out the social, environmental and economical benefits of sustainable products and services. Strategic advertising messages are then connected with corporate communication leading towards the development of a responsible and civic image of the company. However, mainstream media have constrains in promoting sustainability issues due to limitations to the application of persuasive, motivational or educative communication. Most sustainability advertising campaigns therefore combine different types of mainstream media to approach the consumer on different levels of information reception.

=== Radio ===
Sustainability advertising on the radio refers only to audio. High imagery ads that elicit visual images in the minds of listeners show positive effects on attitude toward the brand and purchase intention. The right choice of words for the campaign and the possibility to activate imagination of the consumer and raise the desire for the product or service is the challenge for radio advertising.

=== Print ===
Print media are paper based media methods like magazines, newspaper, books, flyers or posters. Therefore, print advertising generally includes a higher resource use in terms of paper, compared to digital radio and television campaigns. The choice of the right print media is important to inform the defined target group about the sustainable products and services. Advertisements in daily newspapers whose readers are educated and interested in sustainability issues, as well as in magazines promoting a sustainable lifestyle contribute to raise consumers' interest in sustainable products and services. Posters on the other hand are often used for social marketing campaigns.

=== Television ===
Television is the dominant type of media in the developed countries and combines audio and visual possibilities of sustainability advertising. Its effectiveness results from 'learning without involvement' which means that the consumer takes up the information even without being interested at first. Consequentially, television is an essential media for sustainability advertising.

=== Social Media ===
Social media and internet use is rapidly increasing, with a reported 4.62 billion active social media users each averaging 2 1/2 hours daily. Among the primary reasons people use social media is to follow trends on what to do or to buy. Therefore, social media can be a valuable platform for promoting sustainability in products and lifestyle choices.

== Target group ==
The target group for sustainability advertising is "responsible consumers". They are aware of sustainable development issues or in the niche of activists and follow sustainability principles. These consumers have a continuously developing commitment towards a more responsible lifestyle and are serious in their sustainable intentions and behavior. They are interested in information about products or services, real product labeling and have an independent attitude towards mass media and advertising. Responsible consumers can be seen as 'optimistic realists' encouraging society to continue development in a sustainable way. They are critical towards their own behavior concerning environmental impact of the products or services they consume. Responsible consumers are sensitive for corporate behavior and are careful in trusting companies which laud their social or environmental commitment even if it is independently monitored.

They consume efficiently, see economic growth decoupled from environmental degradation and focus on 'common but differentiated responsibility' to improve the quality of life. Responsible consumers demand a higher value from their purchases in terms of social responsibility and environmental impact. They show an increasing awareness on social and environmental issues and offers in domestic and export markets. Focusing on the responsible consumer as an overall target group, further division into the following target subgroups can be made:

- LOHAS – who are strongly concerned about their health, taste of food and with a high level of responsibility for environmental and social issues.
- Status addicts – who are strongly concerned about social visibility of the purchase and want to be perceived as sustainability consumers.
- Transition towns community members – narrow group with the focus on local consumption and sustainability.
- Concerned parents – who want the best and the healthiest products for their children.
- Currently constrained – who would like to be more sustainable, but do not think there is much they can do in their current circumstances.

== Advantages ==
Range of coverage: speed and scale with which the message is spread refers to one of the most significant advantages of the sustainability advertising. Advertising is capable of reaching a large or dispersed market repeatedly with persuasive and informative messages and is considered to be one of the most powerful sources of symbolic meaning in modern society. Sustainability advertising campaigns motivate pro-environmental attitudes. Being one of the tools of sustainability communication strategy, advertising campaigns focus on the intrinsic motivations of the consumers, their attitudes and beliefs as one of the determinants of the sustainability friendly consumption behavior.

Sustainability advertising represents the primary communication tool to which major part of consumer group is exposed on the market. It serves as a source of initial information for the consumers, concerning the social and environmental status of product and company. On the basis of the primary impression the consumer than takes the decision whether the product and the company behind deserve further evaluation as a potential purchase choice. Therefore, sustainability advertising "helps to inform consumers and facilitates consumer choice".

As a marketing communication tool, sustainability advertising can be used as an instrument to modify the impact of human activities on the planet. There are three factors that contribute to the total human impact: population, affluence and technology.

Sustainability advertising addresses affluence by promoting reduction of the environmental and social footprint of the society on the planet. Originally advertising was one of the factors that created consumption culture, thus playing an important role in shaping consumer preferences and the social and environmental impact they produce. Sustainability advertising, however, is responsible for the lifestyle changes in the society, from materialistic towards more sustainable.

A variety of marketing communication tools offer producers a wide range of opportunities to build relationships with a consumer. Due to the format restrictions sustainability advertising often is not able provide comprehensive information about the product. Nevertheless, it serves as a link to more substantial sources of information (e.g. a company's web page) where consumer can find more data on environmental and social aspects of the product. This link enables further development of the communication process between the company and the consumer. So, under favorable conditions and linked to a competent communication strategy it can be transformed into long lasting mutually beneficial relationships between the two.

== Disadvantages, limitations, and challenges ==
Promoting sustainable solutions through sustainability advertising provides corporations with big competitive advantages and allows them to educate and inform consumers as well as stimulate their emotions towards the product. Nevertheless, there are some limitations:

General advertising as well as sustainability advertising operate by sending out unidirectional messages to its entire audience at one. At the same time the ability to connect with the single consumers as well as the chances for them to respond are strongly limited. That means the creation of feedback-relationships between corporations and its customers through sustainable advertisement is limited too. To avoid the typical one-way communication and to provide consumers and corporations with the chance to give and receive feedback, advertising can be used in combination with other key media such as online communication or labeling. Interactive advertising then enables the company to build op strong customer-relationships despite the primer lack of personalized messages.

A special challenge for sustainability advertising is the complexity of the messages that have to be communicated. To avoid what is called 'Sustainability Advertising Myopia' – an exclusive focus on the "green" aspects of the product – the advertising message should not only include the social and environmental attributes of a product, but also connect them to the inherent consumer benefits, (Note: Inherent consumer benefits: cost-effectiveness, health & safety, convenience, status symbol,) as well as mention the main buying criteria (Note: Main buying criteria: functionality, performance, design, durability, taste, freshness.) influencing the consumers' buying decision. However, communicating meaningful about the complex interplay of social, environmental, economic, technical and consumer benefits of a product from a sustainability perspective using a 30-second radio or television slot or a single printed page can be a serious challenge. To make information uptake easier for consumers a selection of the core information and its transformation into simple advertising messages in combination with other key media, like annual environmental reports or links to web pages that provide more detailed information about the product, can be helpful.

A challenge related to the complexity of messages is the risk of information overload. It results from the corporations' effort to gain more credibility and trust by providing search qualities in form of text and fact oriented advertising. However, facing the information overload of today's consumers mainly socio-ecologically conscious consumers perceive the fact focused advertising. Enhancing the emotional appeal of sustainability advertising can create emotional connections with a larger range of consumers and stimulate their involvement with the product. One of the most common approaches is the so-called "Ecotainment" – the creation of consumer's involvement by including a celebrity into the advertisement.

A strong threat to the credibility of sustainability advertising can be seen in corporate "greenwashing", a form of disinformation from organizations seeking to repair public reputations and further shape public images. It allows firms to manipulate an image of environmental, social, and cultural responsiveness by communicating false or misleading sustainability claims. This common practice damages the overall credibility of corporate sustainability claims and leads to mistrust of the consumers. This general inconsistency between a company's messages and it actions could finally explain the value-action gap between consumers strongly expressed concerns about socio-ecological issues and their nevertheless relatively low purchase of sustainable goods and services.

Therefore, the most important future challenge concerning firms as well as advertising agencies is certainly a better understanding of the benefits of corporate socio-ecological responsibility in communications. Especially advertising agencies often lack the technical expertise to ensure that the communications of new sustainable messages are credible and fail to ensure that there is alignment between a client's corporate practices and external communications. This often leads to passed up marketing opportunities and hinders the creation of positive brand value. To overcome those barriers advertising agencies must gain expertise and experience in the fields of sustainable advertising, so the promotion of sustainability issues becomes part of a real corporate philosophy advertised through all communication channels.

== See also ==
- Carrying capacity
- Ecological economics
- Ecologically sustainable development
- Green building
- Greenwashing
- Limits to growth
- List of sustainability topics
- Sustainable living
- Sustainable yield
- Zero carbon city

== Sources ==
- Beder, S. (1997). Global Spin: The Corporate Assault on Environmentalism. Green Books.
- Beder, S. (2000). Global Spin: The Corporate Assault on Environmentalism. Green Books.
- Belz, F.-M.; Peattie, K. (2009). Sustainability Marketing. A global perspective (1st ed.). Glasgow: John Wiley & Sons.
- Bentley, M. (2004). "Tracking Progress: implementing sustainable consumption policies". A global review of implementation of the United Nations Guidelines for Consumer Protection (2nd ed.). UNEP and Consumers International.
- Bolls, Paul D.; Muehling, Darrel D. (2007). "The Effects of Dual-Task Processing on Consumers' Responses to High- and Low-Imagery Radio Advertisements". Journal of Advertising. 36 (4): 35–47. doi:10.2753/JOA0091-3367360403. S2CID 143523914.
- Dennis, E.E. (1991). "In context: environmentalism in the system of news". Media and the Environment. Washington: Island Press. pp. 55–64.
- Dollt, Andreas, ed. (2003). Cinema, TV and radio in the EU – Statistics on audiovisual services – Data 1980–2002. Luxembourg: Office for Official Publications of the European Communities. ISBN 92-894-5709-0. ISSN 1725-4515.
- Earthprint publishing (2007). Sustainability Communications: A Toolkit for Marketing and Advertising Courses.
- Gronroos, C. (1999). "Relationship marketing: Challenges for the organization". Journal of Business Research. 46 (3). doi:10.1016/S0148-2963(98)00030-7.
- Gronroos, C. (1994). "From Marketing Mix to Relationship Marketing:Towards a Paradigm Shift in Marketing". Management Decision. 32 (2). doi:10.1108/00251749410054774. hdl:11323/385.
- Jackson, T. (2005). Motivating sustainable consumption: a review of evidence on consumer behavior and behavioral change. Centre for Environmental Strategy. University of Surrey.
- Kilbourne, William E. (2004). "Sustainable communication and the dominant social paradigm: can they be integrated?". Marketing Theory. 4 (3): 187–208. doi:10.1177/1470593104045536. S2CID 154778630.
- Kolandai-Matchett, K. (2009). "Mediated communication of 'sustainable consumption' in the alternative media: a case study exploring a message framing strategy". International Journal of Consumer Studies. 33 (2): 113–125. doi:10.1111/j.1470-6431.2009.00754.x.
- Krugman, H.E. (1965). "The impact of television advertising: learning without involvement". The Public Opinion Quarterly. 29 (3): 349–356. doi:10.1086/267335.
- Laufer, W.S. (2003). "Social Accountability and Corporate Greenwashing". Journal of Business Ethics. 43.
- Lichtl, M. (1999). Ecotainment: Der neue Weg im Umweltmarketing. Wien, Frankfurt.
- Longhurst, M. (July–August 2003). "Advertising and sustainability: a new paradigm". Admap.
- Lovell, C. (8 May 2004). "Is sustainability an advertising issue?". Campaign.
- McCarthy, E.J. (1960). Basic Marketing. Homewood, IL: Irwin.
- Michaelis, L. (2001). The Media: A Resource for Sustainable Consumption. Oxford: Oxford Centre for the Environment, Ethics & Society.
- Munshi, D.; Kurian, P. (2005). "Imperializing spin cycles: A postcolonial look at public relations, greenwashing, and the separation of publics". Public Relations Review. 31 (4): 513. doi:10.1016/j.pubrev.2005.08.010.
- Pavlou, P.A.; Stewart, D.W. (2000). "Measuring the Effects and Effectiveness of Interactive Advertising: A Research Agenda". Journal of Interactive Advertising. doi:10.1080/15252019.2000.10722044. S2CID 168153520. Archived from the original on 2011-07-26.
- Sandman, P. (1974). "Mass environmental education: can the media do the job?". In Swan, J.A.; Stapp W.B. (eds.). Environmental Education: Strategies Toward a More Livable Future. New York: Sage Publications, Inc. pp. 207–247.
- Sander, Frauke; Fohl, Ulrich; Walter, Nadine (25 March 2021). "Green or social? An analysis of environmental and social sustainability advertising and its impact on brand personality, credibility and attitude". Journal of Brand Management. 28 (4): 429–445. doi:10.1057/s41262-021-00236-8. hdl:10419/287669. S2CID 233676078.
- Schrader, Ulf (2005). "Von der Öko-Werbung zur Nachhaltigkeits-Kommunikation". In Belz, F.-M.; Bilharz, M. (eds.). Nachhaltigkeits-Marketing in Theorie und Praxis. pp. 61–74.
- Shabbir, Muhammad; Sulaiman, Mohammed; Al-Kumaim, Nabil; Mahmood, Arshad; Abbas, Mazhar (29 October 2020). "Green Marketing Approaches and Their Impact on Consumer Behavior towards the Environment—A study from the UAE". Sustainability. 12 (21): 2–8. doi:10.3390/su12218977.
- Shanahan, J. (1996). "Green but unseen: marginalizing the environment on television". In Morgan, M.; Leggett, S. (eds.). Margin(s) and Mainstreams: Cultural Politics in the 90s. Westport, CT: Greenwood Press. pp. 176–193.
- United Nations Environment Programme (UNEP); World Federation of Advertisers (WFA); European Association of Communications Agencies (EACA) (2002). Industry as a partner for sustainable development: Advertising. United Nations Environment Programme.
- United Nations Environment Programme – UNEP (2007). Sustainability Communications. A Toolkit for Marketing and Advertising Courses. Division for Technology, Industry and Economics.
