= Roger Swain =

American television personality

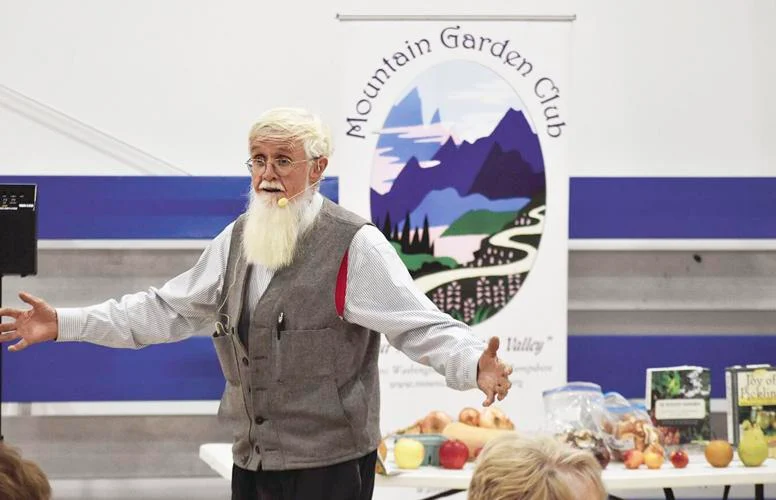
- Swain presents at the North Conway Community Center. (Photo by Daymond Steer)
- Born: February 5, 1949 (age 77); Cambridge, Massachusetts, U.S.
- Education: Harvard College (B.A., 1971; M.A., 1972); Harvard University (PhD)

Roger Bartlett Swain (born 5 February 1949, Cambridge, Massachusetts), known as "the man with the red suspenders", is most famous for hosting The Victory Garden on PBS from the mid-1980s until 2001.

== Career ==
From 1978 to 2008 he was writer and science editor at Horticulture Magazine. He is the author of five books: Earthly Pleasures, Field Days, The Practical Gardener, Saving Graces, and Groundwork.

From 2005 to 2006 he was the co-host of the television show People, Places, and Plants with Paul Tukey on HGTV.

== Personal life and education ==
He graduated from Harvard College with B.A. in 1971 and M.A. in 1972 and went on to earn in 1977 a Ph.D. from Harvard University in Biology.

Roger was married for 31 years to Elisabeth Ward Swain, who died in February 2008.
