= James Underwood Crockett =

American television personality (1915–1979)

- Born: October 9, 1915; Haverhill, Massachusetts, US
- Died: July 11, 1979 (aged 63); Cambridge, Massachusetts, US
- Other names: Jim Crockett, Jim Underwood Crockett
- Occupations: Gardener, TV host
- Children: 4

James Underwood Crockett (October 9, 1915 – July 11, 1979) was a celebrity gardener and author. Crockett is known as the original host of The Victory Garden on PBS television.

== Early life ==
October 9, 1915, Crockett was born in Haverhill, Massachusetts. Crockett's father was Earle Royce Crockett. Crockett's mother was Inez Underwood Crockett.

== Education ==
Crockett studied horticulture at University of Massachusetts and was a member of the Alpha Tau Gamma Fraternity. In Texas, Crockett studied horticulture at Texas Agriculture and Mechanical College. In 1935, Crockett graduated from Stockbridge School of Agriculture in Amherst, Massachusetts.

== Career ==
In the 1940s during World War II, Crockett served in the U.S. Navy in the Pacific Theater.

In April 1975, Crockett became the original host of PBS's The Victory Garden, then called Crockett's Victory Garden. Crockett had been chosen by producer Russell Morash because he had previously written several gardening books. The show debuted on April 16, 1975, and was focused on gardening at home. The garden was located outside WGBH's studios in Allston, Massachusetts.

== Works ==
Crockett's gardening works included many volumes of the Time-Life Encyclopedia of Gardening, including Wildflower Gardening, Perennials, and Flowering Shrubs. He later wrote three books of gardening advice based on the popular and much-loved PBS television series; the first, also called Crockett's Victory Garden, is a general–purpose guide to gardening, treating vegetables, and caring for outside flowers and houseplants. Its approach was unique among garden books, in that it was organized not by the plants in the garden but by the calendar—by the jobs required of you by your garden each month of the year. The second, Crockett's Indoor Garden, is a guide to taking care of houseplants. The third book, Crockett's Flower Garden, is devoted entirely to outdoor flowers. All three books are organized according to an annual calendar, detailing the tasks to be performed throughout the year.

== Personal life ==
In 1943, Crockett married Margaret Williams. In 1940s, they moved to San Francisco, California.

After Crockett's active military service, he and his family moved to Concord, Massachusetts. Crockett and his wife had four children, Carol, Robert, Jean and Mary.

On July 11, 1979, Crockett died from cancer on holiday in Jamaica. He was 63. Crockett is buried at Sleepy Hollow Cemetery in Concord, Massachusetts.

=== Legacy ===
- Jim Crockett Memorial Garden at Elm Bank in Wellesley, Massachusetts.
