= Ivan Hričovský =

Slovak gardener (1932–2024)

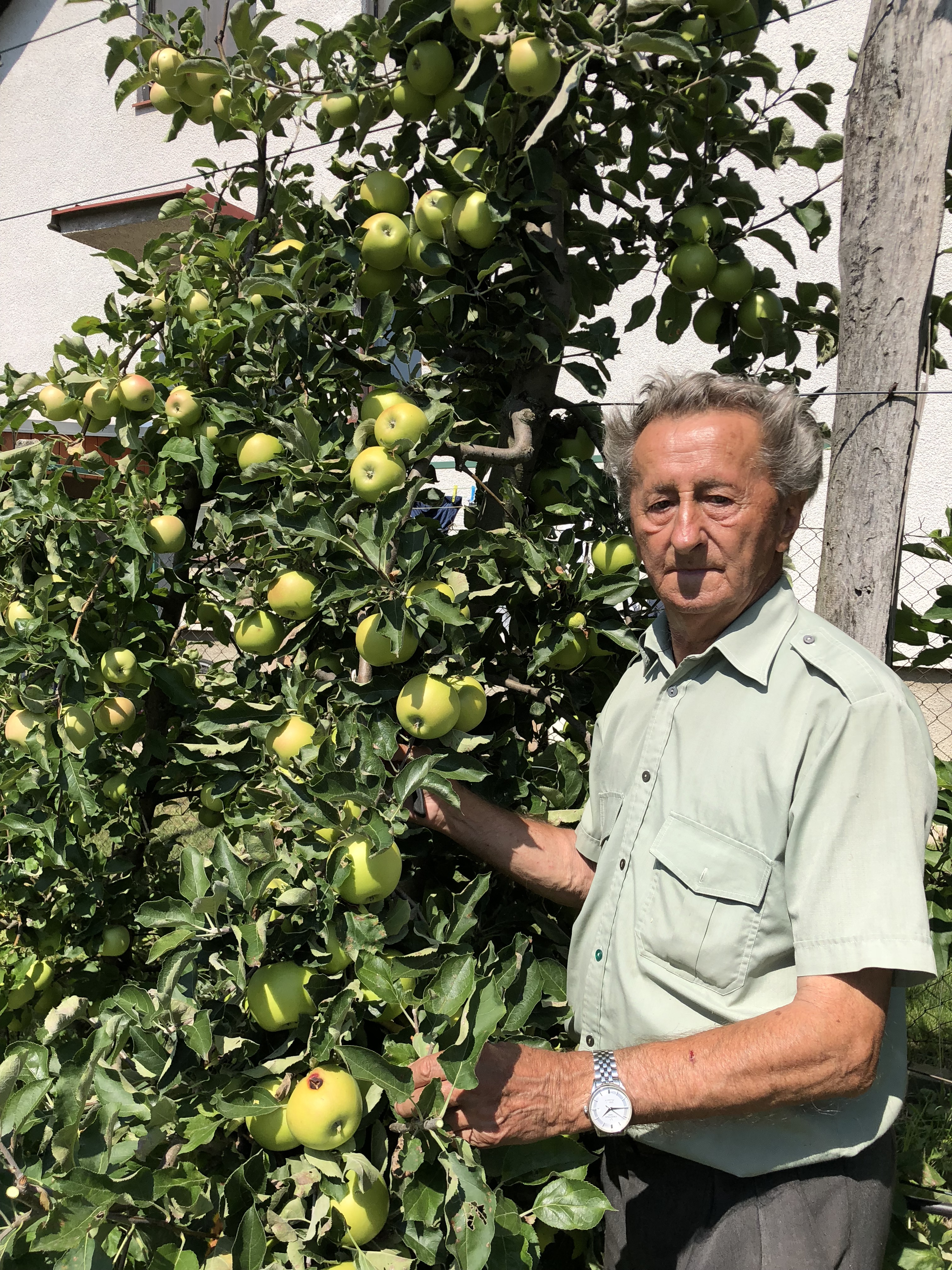
- Hričovský in 2018
- Born: 23 January 1932; Horný Hričov, Czechoslovakia
- Died: 2 July 2024 (aged 92); Bratislava, Slovakia

Ivan Hričovský (23 January 1932 – 2 July 2024) was a Slovak pomologist and celebrity gardener. He was widely seen as the founding father of modern gardening in Slovakia and towards the end of his life enjoyed widespread popularity in traditional and social media.

== Early life and education ==
Ivan Hričovský was born on 23 January 1932 in the village of Horný Hričov in Žilina District. He studied at the Lednice campus Faculty of Horticulture of the Mendel University in Brno, graduating in 1955.

== Career ==
Following graduation, Hričovský worked in applied research of fruit cultivation at various agricultural cooperatives. He cultivated two new variants of blackcurrant. In 1989 he became a professor at the Slovak University of Agriculture, where he taught until his retirement in 2009.

Hričovský gained mass following only towards the end of his academic career. This was predominantly due to his recurrent appearances in the Farmer's revue program on the public broadcaster Slovak Television and Radio, aired since 2007. He also wrote 14 popular books about gardening, which sold over 150,000 copies. In addition, Hričovský published an annual gardening calendar, which sold about 25,000 copies yearly. His gardening Facebook page had over 145,000 followers.

== Death ==
Ivan Hričovský died from pneumonia at a hospital in Bratislava, on 2 July 2024, at the age of 92. According to an obituary published in the Pravda newspaper, Hričovský was one of the last personalities enjoying universal popularity in a deeply divided Slovak society. The president of Slovakia Peter Pellegrini as well as the minister of agriculture Richard Takáč paid homage to his accomplishments after his death. The Slovak Television and Radio scheduled an extraordinary episode of the Farmer's revue devoted to the memory of Hričovský to be aired on 6 July.

== Awards ==
In 2006, Hričovský was awarded an honorary degree by his alma mater, the Mendel University. In 2010, he was awarded the Order of Ľudovít Štúr, 2nd class by the president of Slovakia Ivan Gašparovič.
