= Christmas in the Trenches =

1984 song by John McCutcheon

"Christmas in the Trenches" is a ballad from John McCutcheon's 1984 album Winter Solstice. It tells the story of the 1914 Christmas Truce between the British and German lines on the Western Front during the Great War from the perspective of a fictional British soldier. Although Francis Tolliver is a fictional character, the event depicted in the ballad is true. McCutcheon met some of the German soldiers involved in this Christmas story when he toured in Denmark.

== Concept ==
The ballad is a first person narrative by Francis Tolliver, a fictional British soldier from Liverpool. He is relating the events that happened two years prior, while he was a soldier in the trenches of the Great War. He and his fellow soldiers are dug into their trench, where, as Tolliver relates, "the frost so bitter hung," while their German enemies occupy the trench at the opposite end of No Man's Land. The scene is one of quiet and cold; "the frozen fields of France were still; no songs of peace were sung." The men are reflecting on how their families back in England are toasting "their brave and glorious lads so far away", when from the German lines they suddenly hear a young German voice singing out clearly. He is soon joined by his comrades, and the sound of their carol fills the empty fields devastated by war. When they finish, some of the British soldiers from Kent sing "God Rest Ye Merry Gentlemen," after which the Germans sing "Stille Nacht". The British soldiers accompany them, singing in English, "and in two tongues one song filled up the sky."

The British troops are startled when their front line sentry cries out that a lone German figure has left their trench and is marching alone across No Man's Land, unarmed and with a truce flag. Though all of the men aim their rifles at him, nobody fires, and soon all of the men on both sides are leaving their trenches and meeting their enemies unarmed in No Man's Land. There, they trade chocolate and cigarettes and exchange photographs of their families back home, at which all of the men are struck by how similar their enemy is to themselves. One of the Germans plays his violin while a British soldier plays his squeezebox, and the men launch flares to light up the field in order to play a game of football. Later, with the first signs of daylight, Tolliver relates that "France was France once more; With sad farewells we each began to settle back to war." But, McCutcheon sings, "the question haunted every man who lived that wondrous night; 'whose family have I fixed within my sight?'" It ends with the fictional Tolliver's lessons gleaned from the experience; that "the ones who call the shots won't be among the dead and lame- and on each end of the rifle we're the same."

== See also ==
- List of anti-war songs
