= Chet Parker =

American hammered dulcimer player

- Born: 1891
- Origin: Michigan, United States
- Died: 1975 (aged 83–84)
- Occupation: Instrumentalist
- Instruments: Hammered dulcimer, snare drum, fife, fiddle
- Label: Folkways

Chet Parker (August, 1891–1975) was a hammered dulcimer player from Michigan.

Chet Parker was born the son of a blacksmith. His first instruments were the snare drum and the fife. He also learned to play the fiddle (his father was a fiddler) and to read music. He was introduced to the hammered dulcimer by a friend, who loaned him one, in 1900. Chet made his own dulcimer in 1904, and continued to play it the rest of his life.

Parker was a key figure in introducing the hammered dulcimer to the folk revival of the 1960s. He appeared at the Newport Folk Festival in 1964, playing Golden Slippers and the Temperance Reel. These performances were included on the record Traditional Music at Newport 1964: Part 1 (Vanguard Records VRS-9182). This appearance in Newport is often credited with starting the revival of interest in the hammered dulcimer. Players Guy Carawan and Sam Rizzetta are among those who have said that Parker was the first person they heard play the hammered dulcimer. In turn, Carawan would later influence younger players such as Malcolm Dalglish and John McCutcheon.

Later, Parker's playing was recorded by Patrick Murphy of Kalamazoo, Michigan, and issued as The Hammer Dulcimer Played By Chet Parker by Folkways Records (Folkways FA2381) in 1966. In the 1960s, Parker played dulcimer on summer Saturday afternoons at Winick's Driftwood Resort near Croton Dam, Michigan, accompanied by Killer Wade on guitar. Parker continued to appear at festivals for the next several years, including the 1969 Smithsonian Festival of American Folklife and the 1970 Kalamazoo Folk Festival.
