= Horný Hričov =

Village and municipality in Slovakia

- Municipality
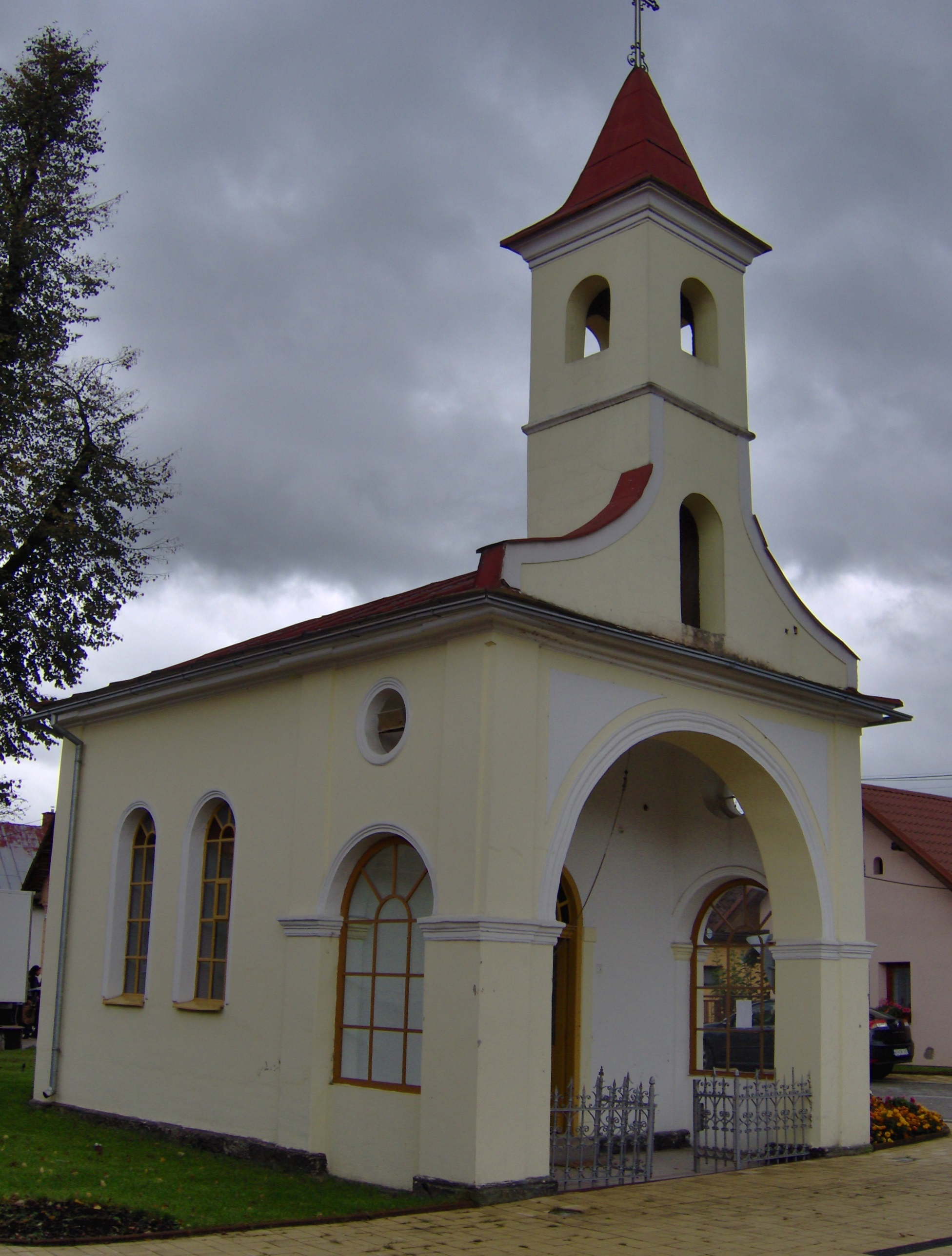

- Flag

- Location of Horný Hričov in the Žilina Region Location of Horný Hričov in Slovakia
- Coordinates: 49.25°N 18.67°E
- Country: Slovakia
- Region: Žilina Region
- District: Žilina District
- First mentioned: 1208

Area
  - Total: 5.78 km^{2} (2.23 sq mi)
- Elevation: 311 m (1,020 ft)

Population (2025)
  - Total: 879
- Time zone: UTC+1 (CET)
  - Summer (DST): UTC+2 (CEST)
- Postal code: 134 2
- Area code: +421 41
- Vehicle registration plate (until 2022): ZA
- Website: www.hornyhricov.sk

Horný Hričov (Hungarian: Felsőricsó) is a village and municipality in Žilina District in the Žilina Region of northern Slovakia.

== History ==
In historical records the village was first mentioned in 1208.

== Geography ==
The municipality lies at an altitude of 311 metres (1,020 ft) and covers an area of 5.78 km^{2} (2.23 sq mi) (2025).

== Population ==
Population statistic (10 years)
Year	1995	2005	2015	2025
Count	696	781	794	879
Difference		+12.21%	+1.66%	+10.70%

Population statistic
Year	2024	2025
Count	884	879
Difference		−0.56%

It has a population of 879 people (31 December 2025).

=== Ethnicity ===
Census 2021 (1+ %)
Ethnicity	Number	Fraction
Slovak	828	99.16%
Total	835	

In year 2021 was 835 people by ethnicity 828 as Slovak, 6 as Not found out, 3 as Czech, 3 as Other, 1 as Irish, 1 as Rusyn, 1 as Russian and 1 as Hungarian.

Note on population: The difference values of population numbers in the table "Population statistic" and in the sections "Ethnicity" & "Religion" is caused by the use of various statistical methods.

=== Religion ===
Census 2021 (1+ %)
Religion	Number	Fraction
Roman Catholic Church	601	71.98%
None	194	23.23%
Evangelical Church	13	1.56%
Total	835	

In year 2021 was 835 people by religion 601 from Roman Catholic Church, 194 from None, 13 from Evangelical Church, 6 from Not found out, 6 from Ad hoc movements, 5 from Greek Catholic Church, 4 from Christian Congregations in Slovakia, 2 from United Methodist Church, 1 from Calvinist Church, 1 from Paganism and natural spirituality, 1 from Other and not ascertained christian church and 1 from Church of Jesus Christ of Latter-day Saints.

== Genealogical resources ==
The records for genealogical research are available at the state archive "Statny Archiv in Bytca, Slovakia"

- Roman Catholic church records (births/marriages/deaths): 1690-1952 (parish B)

== Notable people ==
- Ivan Hričovský (1932–2024) - pomologist

== See also ==
- List of municipalities and towns in Slovakia
