= Freyda Epstein =

American folk musician and music teacher

- Born: November 30, 1956; Boston, MA, U.S.
- Origin: Boston, Massachusetts, U.S.
- Died: May 17, 2003 (aged 46) Madison, Virginia, U.S.
- Genres: folk
- Occupations: Musician; singer
- Instruments: fiddle; viola; guitar

Freyda Epstein (Nov 30, 1956 – May 17, 2003) was an American folk musician. She was influential in the music communities of Elkins, West Virginia, central Virginia, Asheville, North Carolina, and Berkeley, California. She performed as part of Trapezoid, Freyda & Acoustic AttaTude, and collaborated with and taught many local musicians.

== Discography ==
- Now and Then (Flying Fish, 1980) Lorraine Duisit, vocals, mandolin; Freyda Epstein, vocals, violin, viola; Ralph Gordon, vocals, bass, cello; Paul Reisier, guitar, hammer dulcimer.
- Another Country (Flying Fish, 1982)
- Cool of the Day (Sugar Hill, 1985) (Lorraine Duisit, Freyda Epstein, Ralph Gordon and Paul Reisler)
- Midnight at Cabell Hall (Red House Records, 1994) (Freyda Epstein, Ralph Gordon, and Bob Vasile)
- Globallullabies (Music for Little People, 1995)

== Death ==
Freyda was heading to a local music gathering near Charlottesville, Virginia when she died in a car accident in 2003.
