= Smoke Rise, Georgia =

Residential community in Georgia, U.S.

Coordinates: 33°50′40″N 84°09′55″W

Smoke Rise
- Neighborhood / Community
- Location in Georgia, United States
- Country: United States
- State: Georgia
- County: DeKalb
- City: Tucker
- Time zone: UTC-5 (Eastern)
  - Summer (DST): UTC-4 (EDT)

Smoke Rise is a residential community in DeKalb County, Georgia, United States, located northeast of Atlanta in the City of Tucker, incorporated in 2016. It is located north of the city of Stone Mountain on the eastern side of the city of Tucker.

== Notable inhabitants ==
- John McCutcheon (b. 1952), folk singer/songwriter
