= Paul Van Arsdale =

American musician (1920–2018)

- Born: October 19, 1920; Pennsylvania, U.S.
- Died: March 29, 2018 (aged 97); New York, U.S.
- Occupation: Musician
- Instrument: Hammered dulcimer

Paul Van Arsdale (October 19, 1920 – March 29, 2018) was an American hammered dulcimer player from North Tonawanda in upstate New York.

== Biography ==
Paul (the sixth of eleven children) and his brothers Phil and Sterl learned to play from their grandfather, Jesse R. Martin (born June 9, 1854, died January 1, 1939). Martin was discovered in 1925 by agents working for Henry Ford. Ford was unhappy with the popularity of jazz, and had started a campaign to re-popularize the dances and music of his youth. Martin visited Ford in December 1925, on the heels of the phenomenal visit of Maine fiddler Mellie Dunham. He then became a local celebrity and for the next few years played throughout western New York and northwestern Pennsylvania. In 1930 he went to live with his daughter's family, and for the next four or five years (until he went to a nursing home) he spent evenings teaching Van Arsdale tunes and playing style. The repertoire that Van Arsdale learned from his grandfather was mostly dance music – jigs, reels, waltzes, and schottisches. He has continued to learn new tunes over the years from friends, recordings, and the radio.

After Van Arsdale graduated from high school, he began training as a machinist. He married his wife, Fern, and started a family. For many years he played only rarely - just alone, for fun, and at annual Van Arsdale family reunions. He made one appearance on a talent show on a Buffalo television station in 1950. In 1977, Van Arsdale's daughter Janet heard John McCutcheon playing a concert at the University at Buffalo. She introduced McCutcheon to her father. By that time he had already appeared at the 1977 Smithsonian Festival of American Folklife and at 1976 dulcimer events like the meeting of the Original Dulcimer Players Club, in Bridgeport, Michigan.

Van Arsdale's hammers follow tradition and contribute to his unique style. He used long, flexible hammers made from ground-down hacksaw blades, with wooden blocks attached to the ends. The wooden blocks are then covered with pieces of thin glove leather. These hammers are very similar in design to the ones his grandfather used.

There are two sources for transcriptions of Van Arsdale's tunes. His Dulcimer Heritage album comes with a book featuring all of the tunes on the album transcribed by Nicholas Hawes in standard notation. In addition, a collection of his tunes was published in 1987 as Tunes for the Hammered Dulcimer, As Played By Paul Van Arsdale with transcriptions by Jean Lewis. The book contains 36 tunes, including some of the ones Van Arsdale learned from his grandfather, and three of his own compositions. Jean Lewis' book has been expanded and re-issued in 2008. It now contains about 75 tunes, a biography, and notes about Van Arsdale's playing style and hammers. He died in March 2018 at the age of 97.

== Discography ==
=== As principal performer ===
- Dulcimer Heritage, Folk Legacy CD-87, 1983

=== Other appearances ===
- Various artists, Brave Boys: New England Traditions in Folk Music, New World Records 80239, 1977 (Paul and brothers Phil and Sterl appear on one track playing The Flowers of Edinburgh)
- John McCutcheon, Barefoot Boy With Boots On, Rounder CD0419 (originally released as Front Hall FHR-021), 1980 (appears on two tracks)
- John McCutcheon, Step By Step, Rounder CD0216, 1987 (appears on two tracks)
- Vic Kibler, Adirondack Fiddler, Sampler 8914, 1992
