= Sam Rizzetta =

American hammered dulcimer player

- Born: May 23, 1942; Chicago, Illinois, United States
- Died: October 26, 2021 (aged 79) Inwood, West Virginia, United States
- Genres: Folk
- Occupations: Musician, instrument builder
- Instrument: Hammered dulcimer
- Years active: 1960s~2021
- Formerly of: Trapezoid
- Website: www.samrizzetta.com

Sam Rizzetta (May 23, 1942 – October 26, 2021) was a hammered dulcimer player, builder, and designer originally from Chicago, had lived in Inwood, West Virginia.

Rizzetta discovered the hammered dulcimer while working in the repair of guitars and illustrated books in the 1960s to put himself through graduate school. His first exposure to the instrument was hearing the traditional player Chet Parker. Sam and his wife Carrie moved east around 1968, and he took a job with the Smithsonian Institution. Within a few years he transitioned to playing and building instruments on a full-time basis.

In 1974, Rizzetta and Paul Reisler formed a string band called Trapezoid, along with Pete Vigour and Paul Yeaton. The group's trademark was hammered dulcimer quartets, which included soprano and bass models designed by Rizzetta. Rizzetta performed with the group until 1978, when he decided to pursue solo playing, and concentrate more on building and composing. As a performer he is best known for his hammered dulcimer playing, but his recordings often feature the Appalachian dulcimer as well. He was active in teaching the dulcimer at the Augusta Heritage Center at Davis and Elkins College for many years starting in 1981. Rizzetta has also been a regular columnist in Dulcimer Players News, writing the Technical Dulcimer column.

Rizzetta is particularly noted for a number of innovations in hammered dulcimer design. These include bridge markers (a standard feature of modern instruments), chromatic designs, extra bridges, damper pedals, and many more. Rizzetta has collaborated closely with the Dusty Strings Company of Seattle, Washington; they have produced a "Rizzetta series" of chromatic models for many years.

== Discography ==
- Trapezoid (self-titled), 1975 (reissued, 1998)
- Bucks & Does, 1982
- Seven Valleys, 1987
- When You And I Were Young, 1989
- Christmas In The Air, 1991
- In The Garden, Hymns For Hammer Dulcimer, 1992
- Ocean's Edge, 1993
- Flowing Waters, 1993
- Saving Trees, 1999
- Dulcimer Boogie, 2000
- Peace Of Christmas, 2003
