= People, Places, and Plants =

American gardening magazine

- Editor: Paul Tukey
- Staff writers: Dr. Rick Churchill; Allen Lessels
- Categories: Gardening
- Frequency: Bimonthly
- Circulation: 65,000
- Publisher: Paul Tukey
- Founded: 1995
- First issue: January 1996
- Final issue: 1999
- Country: United States
- Based in: New Gloucester, Maine
- Language: English
- Website: www.ppplants.com
- ISSN: 1092-9223

People, Places & Plants was an American gardening magazine based in New Gloucester, Maine, covering the areas of New England and New York. People, Places & Plants is also the name of a gardening television program syndicated by Home & Garden Television.

== History ==
Maine journalist and landscaper Paul Tukey co-founded People, Places & Plants in late 1995 and the magazine's first issue was published in January 1996. At the initial phase, the magazine was headquartered in Falmouth, Maine. By late 1997, the magazine was the top-selling garden magazine in Maine.

After establishing itself as a publication on gardening in New England and New York, a Mid-Atlantic edition was launched in 2003. It suffered from sluggish sales and was discontinued in late 2004. People, Places & Plants published its 50th issue, billed also as a special 10th anniversary issue, in May 2005.

During late 2008 and 2009 issues of PPP were sporadic. The spring 2009 issue (volume 14, issue 2, edition 70) was received in June 2009 and on the bottom of page 12, it was announced that the magazine frequency was decreasing from six issues per year to three. The spring 2009 issue was the last one mailed to subscribers.

In a gardening column by Tom Atwell in the Sunday Press Herald on January 31, 2010, Rick Churchill (one of the writers of the magazine) announced: PPP has ceased publication, although Paul Tukey has made no official announcement. There has not been an issue for eight months, and issues were sporadic before that. Tukey, contacted by e-mail, said the magazine is not yet officially dead. "It is still listed for sale by a Portland broker," he wrote, "and several entities are interested in acquiring the title to move it forward in some fashion. Until that happens, we've been holding off making an announcement." He hopes to notify subscribers by March 1, 2010.

However, later it was declared that the magazine ceased publication in 2009.

== TV program ==
A television program of People, Places & Plants, filmed at Weston Nurseries in Hopkinton, Massachusetts, and hosted by Roger Swain and Paul Tukey, debuted in March 2003. Two seasons were produced and aired on Home & Garden Television. Tukey earned the honor of America's Horticultural Communicator of the Year from the American Horticultural Society in 2006.
