= Russell Cook (musician) =

American hammered dulcimer builder and player

- Origin: Oklahoma, United States
- Occupations: Musician, instrument maker
- Instrument: Hammered dulcimer
- Website: www.russellcook.com (defunct)

Russell Cook is a hammered dulcimer builder and player from Oklahoma, United States.

Russell won first place in the 1981 Walnut Valley National Hammered Dulcimer Championship held in Winfield, Kansas. Cook built his first dulcimer in 1979, and has gone on to build hammered dulcimers. He originally operated under the name Wood 'N Strings. In 1991, he merged with Mark and Steve Tindle to form Master Works, which is now located in Bennington, Oklahoma. Master Works is now considered one of the finest dulcimer builders in the United States, and is endorsed by many hammered dulcimer players, such as Ted Yoder and Joshua Messick.

== Discography ==
- Red Haired Boy, n/a
- Timeless, 1993
- Morning Has Broken, 1988
- Hark!, 1990
- Reminisce, 1991
- Precious Memories, 1992
- Classical Journeys: Going Home, 1994
- White Christmas, 1998
- Love Me Tender, 2000
- Twilight in the Highlands, 2002
