= Paul Pavlou =

American academic

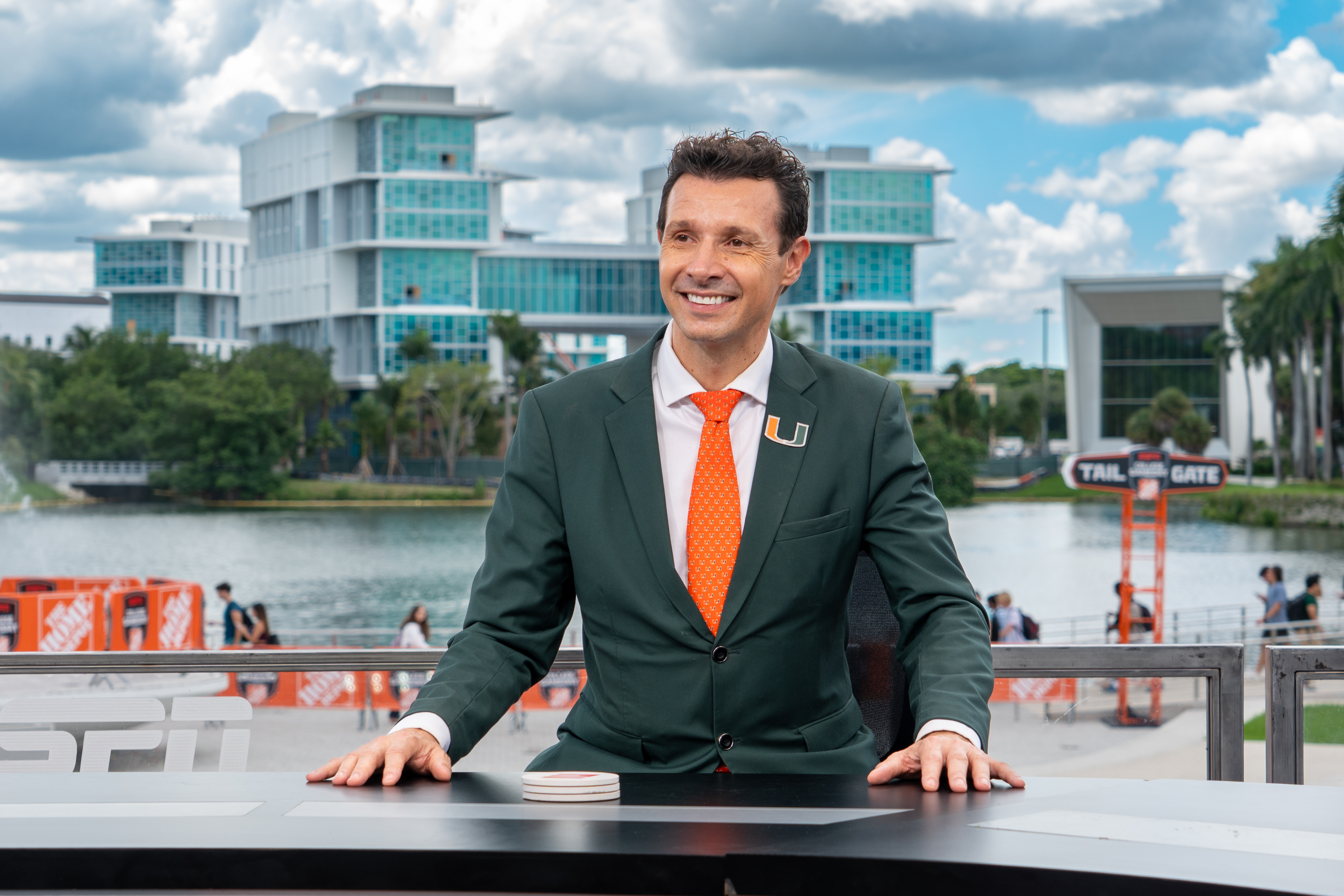
- Pavlou in 2025
- Education: Rice University (BS); University of Southern California (MS and PhD)
- Occupation: Dean
- Organization: Miami Herbert Business School

Paul A. Pavlou is an academic and administrator who has taught at Temple University and the University of Houston. Since 2024, he has been dean of the Miami Herbert Business School.

In 2014, Pavlou was named to Thomson Reuters' list of most influential scientific minds. From 2002 through 2012, he was one of the most highly cited researchers in the field of business.
