= The Carefree Gardener =

American television series

The Carefree Gardener is a television series about gardening and landscaping. The show debuted September 29, 2006, on KPNX-TV, the NBC affiliate in Phoenix, Arizona, as a one-hour series and was changed to a half-hour series for its national distribution that began May 1, 2007, on the America One Network.

The series is hosted by Craig Allison has since been syndicated to ION Life and many smaller networks and affiliate stations.

The scope of the show covers all aspects of landscape and gardening, including: design, construction methods, growing plants, and teaching others how to do it themselves.

The series is produced by JimmyKristie Productions LLC.
