= Billy Bennington =

- Born: 1900; Barford, Norfolk
- Died: October 1986 (aged 85–86)
- Occupation: Hammered dulcimer player
- Instruments: Hammered dulcimer, glockenspiel

Billy Bennington (1900 – 18 October 1986) was an English hammered dulcimer player.

== Biography ==
Bennington was born in Barford, Norfolk into a musical household - his mother played melodeon and his father played the tin whistle. Bennington's first instrument was a glockenspiel, which he was given around age six. He was later given his first dulcimer by his father, who kept the King's Head public house at Barford. In 1912, Bennington went to the Hingham Show, where he heard Billy Cooper playing the dulcimer. Cooper's father was bandmaster of the Hingham and Watton band, and Bennington took lessons from him. Bennington frequently rode a bicycle with his dulcimer strapped to his back, with the ends sticking out above his shoulders. This made him look like he had wings, and so he acquired the nickname "the Barford Angel".

He usually played by striking the strings with cane beaters (hammers) bound with wool, but sometimes he would pluck the strings with the nails of the first finger and thumb. On some tunes he would even combine these two techniques. He played a wide range of tunes, including hornpipes, polkas, schottisches, jigs, and marches.

Bennington spent most of his life as a gardener, and continued to perform well into his eighties at local folk festivals, frequently accompanied by his wife Iris. He died in October 1986.

== Discography ==
=== As principal performer ===
- The Barford Angel, Veteran VT152CD (reissue of earlier LP) www.veteran.co.uk

=== Other appearances ===
- Various artists, I Thought I Was The Only One, Veteran VTDC12CD www.veteran.co.uk
