= The Victory Garden (TV program) =

American public television program

- Genre: Gardening
- Created by: Russell Morash
- Starring: James Underwood Crockett (1975-1979); Bob Thomson (1979-1991); Roger Swain (1991-2002); Michael Weishan (2002-2007); Jamie Durie (2007-2010)
- Theme music composer: Bill Spence; Bell & Shapiro
- Opening theme: "Gaspe Reel" (The Hammered Dulcimer) "The Victory Garden Theme"
- Ending theme: "The Victory Garden Theme"
- Composers: Bell & Shapiro
- Country of origin: United States
- Original language: English
- No. of seasons: 36

Production
- Running time: 30 minutes
- Production company: WGBH-TV

Original release
- Network: PBS
- Release: April 16, 1975 – 2010

The Victory Garden is an American public television program about gardening and other outdoor activities, which was produced by station WGBH-TV in Boston, Massachusetts, and distributed by PBS. It was the oldest gardening program produced for television in the United States, premiering on April 16, 1975.

== History ==
The show was originally called Crockett's Victory Garden for its first host, James Underwood Crockett. On each episode, Crockett demonstrates and cares for a vegetable, fruit, and flower garden and explains topics such as how to build a cold frame, and why salt marsh hay was useful as a mulch. At the end of each episode, Crockett was in the greenhouse, as he answered viewer questions about gardening. The garden set was built on the site of the WGBH studio parking lot—close enough for the wired cameras to reach—by Tom and Dickie Silva of the Silva Brothers Construction, Inc. who would later star on This Old House.

At one point viewers from Colorado played a prank on James Crockett and sent the Victory Garden an envelope of seeds that, when sprouted, turned out to be marijuana. The prank upset Crockett who asked Morash to dispose of the plants.

Following Crockett's death at the age of 63, Bob Thomson hosted the program from 1979 to 1991 and the show was renamed The Victory Garden. With Thomson at the helm, The Victory Garden began to broaden its scope. In addition to the regular gardening demonstrations, the show began to make room for more guests and travel features. Marian Morash, wife of series producer Russell Morash, appeared on the air to do her recipes on the program from 1979 to 2001.

Roger Swain hosted the program from 1991 to 2002, Michael Weishan hosted the program from 2002 to 2007. Jamie Durie hosted the program from 2007 to 2010. In 2013, the show was relaunched in partnership with Edible Communities, and it became The Victory Garden's EdibleFeast. It was produced for two seasons.

== Major publications ==
- Crockett, James Underwood. (1977). Crockett's Victory Garden. New York: Little, Brown. ISBN 978-0-316-16121-3.
- Crockett, James Underwood. (1978). Crockett's Indoor Garden. New York: Little, Brown. ISBN 978-0-316-16124-4.
- Crockett, James Underwood. (1981). Crockett's Flower Garden. New York: Little, Brown. ISBN 978-0-316-16132-9.
- Morash, Marian. (1982). The Victory Garden Cookbook. New York: Knopf. ISBN 978-0-394-50897-9.
- Wirth, Thomas. (1984). The Victory Garden Landscape Guide. New York: Little, Brown. ISBN 978-0-316-94845-6.
- Thomson, Bob. (1987). The New Victory Garden. New York: Little, Brown. ISBN 978-0-316-84337-9.
- Wilson, Jim. (1990). Masters of the Victory Garden. New York: Little, Brown. ISBN 978-0-316-94501-1.
- Weishan, Michael and Laurie Donnelly. (2006). The Victory Garden Companion. New York: William Morrow. ISBN 978-0-06-059977-5.
