= John McCutcheon =

American singer-songwriter (born 1952)

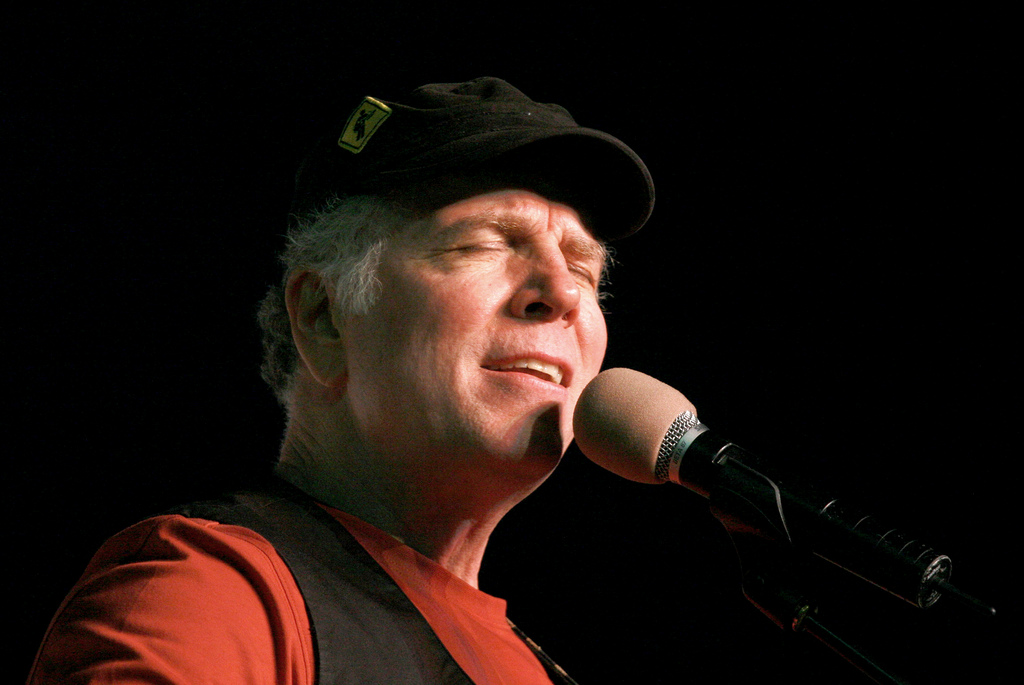
- McCutcheon performs at Blue Mountains Music Festival in Australia, March 2010.

Background information
- Born: August 14, 1952 (age 74); Wausau, Wisconsin, United States
- Genre: Folk
- Occupations: Singer-songwriter, multi-instrumentalist
- Instruments: hammered dulcimer, Appalachian dulcimer, fiddle, banjo, guitar, autoharp, Jew’s harp
- Website: folkmusic.com

John McCutcheon (born August 14, 1952) is an American folk music singer-songwriter and multi-instrumentalist who has produced 38 albums since 1977. He is regarded as a master of the hammered dulcimer, and is also proficient on many other instruments including guitar, banjo, autoharp, mountain dulcimer, fiddle, and jaw harp. He has received six Grammy Award nominations.

== Career ==
McCutcheon was born to Roman Catholic parents in Wausau, Wisconsin. He attended Saint James Grade School, Newman Catholic High School, and Saint John's University.

While in his 20s, he travelled to Appalachia and learned from some of the legendary greats of traditional folk music, including Roscoe Holcomb and Tommy Hunter. His repertoire includes songs from contemporary writers like Si Kahn (e.g. "Gone Gonna Rise Again", "Rubber Blubber Whale") as well as a large body of his own music.

When McCutcheon became a father in the early 1980s he found most children's music "unmusical and condescending", and sought to change the situation by releasing a children's album, Howjadoo, in 1983. Originally, he had only intended to do one children's record, but the popularity of this first effort led to the production of seven additional children's albums. He has written three children's books. Much of his work, however, continues to focus on writing politically and socially conscious songs for adult audiences. One of his most successful songs, "Christmas in the Trenches" (from his 1984 album Winter Solstice), tells the story of the Christmas truce of 1914.

In his performances, McCutcheon often introduces his music with a story. He has become known as a storyteller, and has made multiple appearances at the National Storytelling Festival in Jonesborough, Tennessee. He is married to children's author and storyteller, Carmen Agra Deedy, and the two live in Smoke Rise, Georgia.

McCutcheon's music has, since the 1990s, increasingly evolved into heartland rock-influenced ballads, while he still occasionally performs purer folk music. In 2011, he portrayed IWW organizer and songwriter Joe Hill in Si Kahn's one-man play Joe Hill's Last Will, produced by Main Stage West in Sebastopol, California.

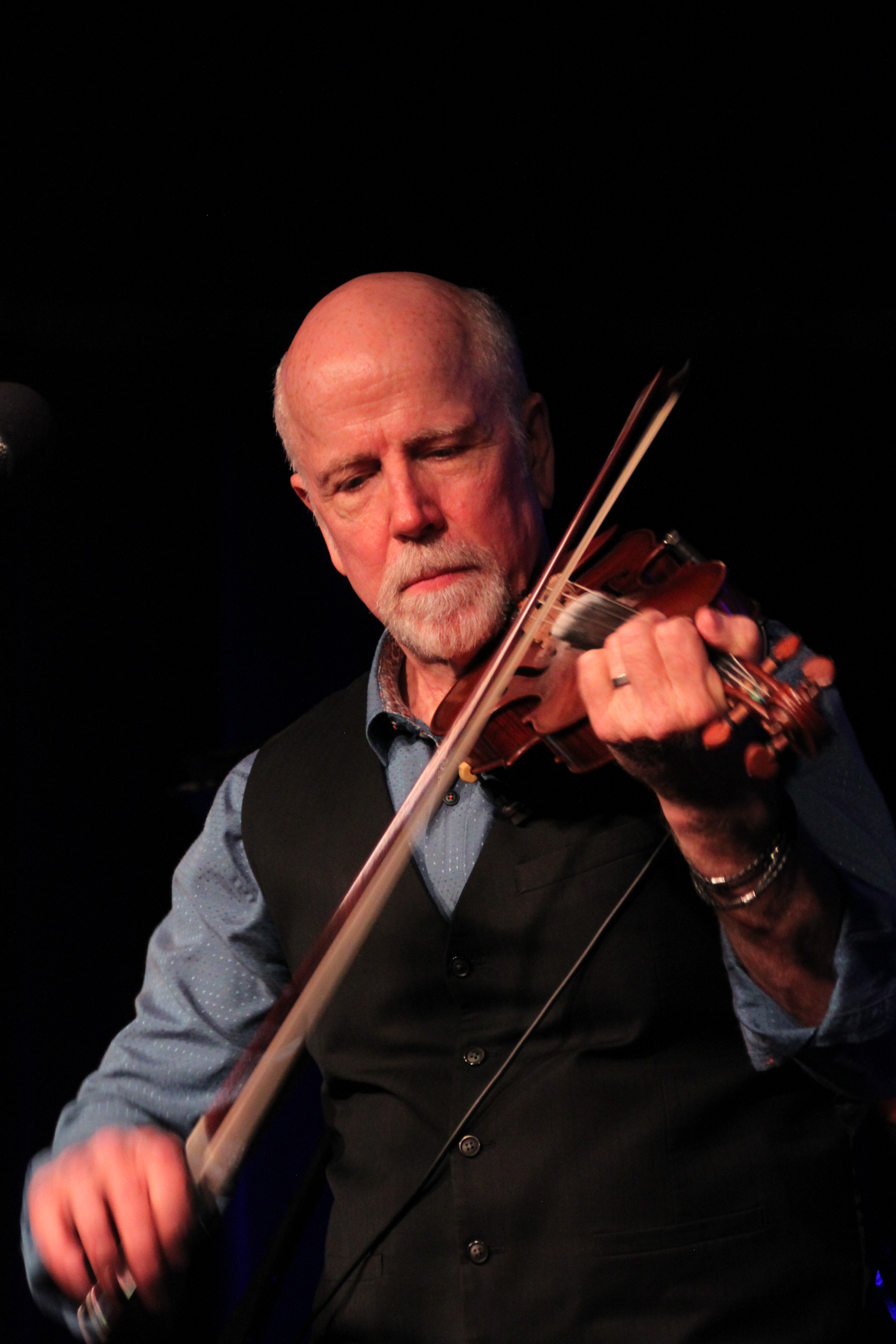
John McCutcheon performs in Richmond, Virginia on April 21, 2017.

== Discography ==
- How Can I Keep From Singing (1975)
- The Wind That Shakes the Barley (1977)
- Barefoot Boy with Boots On (1980)
- Fine Times at Our House (1982)
- Howjadoo (1983)
- Winter Solstice (1984)
- Signs of the Times (with Si Kahn) (1986)
- Step By Step: Hammer Dulcimer Duets, Trios and Quartets (1986)
- Gonna Rise Again (1987)
- Mail Myself to You (1988)
- Water from Another Time: A Retrospective (1989)
- What It's Like (1990)
- Live at Wolf Trap (1991)
- Family Garden (1993)
- Between the Eclipse (1994)
- Summersongs (1995)
- Wintersongs (1995)
- Nothing to Lose (1995)
- Sprout Wings and Fly (1997)
- Bigger Than Yourself (1997)
- Autumnsongs (1998)
- Springsongs (1999)
- Storied Ground (1999)
- The Greatest Story Never Told (2002)
- Hail to the Chief (2003)
- Stand Up! Broadsides for Our Time (2004)
- Welcome the Traveler Home: The Winfield Songs (2004)
- Mightier Than the Sword (2005)
- This Fire (2007)
- Untold (2009)
- Passage (2010)
- 22 Days (2013)
- Ghost Light (2018)
- To Everyone in All the World: A Celebration of Pete Seeger (2019)
- Cabin Fever: Songs from the Quarantine (2020)
- Bucket List (2021)
- Leap! (2022)
- Together (with Tom Paxton) (2023)
- Field of Stars (2025)
- Together Again (with Tom Paxton) (2026)

== Videography ==
- Hammer Dulcimer Instruction (2004)
- John McCutcheon LIVE! (Concert) (2008)
- Joe Hill's Last Will (Play) (2015)

== Books ==
- Happy Adoption Day (1996)
- Christmas in the Trenches (2006, book with CD)
- Flowers for Sarajevo (2017)

== Grammy Award nominations ==
John McCutcheon has received six Grammy nominations. The Grammy Awards are awarded annually by the National Academy of Recording Arts and Sciences.

Year	Nominee / work	Award	Result
1995	"John McCutcheon's Four Seasons: Summersongs"	Best Musical Album for Children	Nominated
1996	"John McCutcheon's Four Seasons: Wintersongs"	Best Musical Album for Children	Nominated
1997	"Bigger Than Yourself"	Best Musical Album for Children	Nominated
1998	"John McCutcheon's Four Seasons: Autumnsongs"	Best Musical Album for Children	Nominated
1999	"John McCutcheon's Four Seasons: Springsongs"	Best Musical Album for Children	Nominated
2006	"Christmas in the Trenches"	Best Spoken Word Album for Children	Nominated
