= Hammered dulcimer =

Group of percussion-stringed instruments

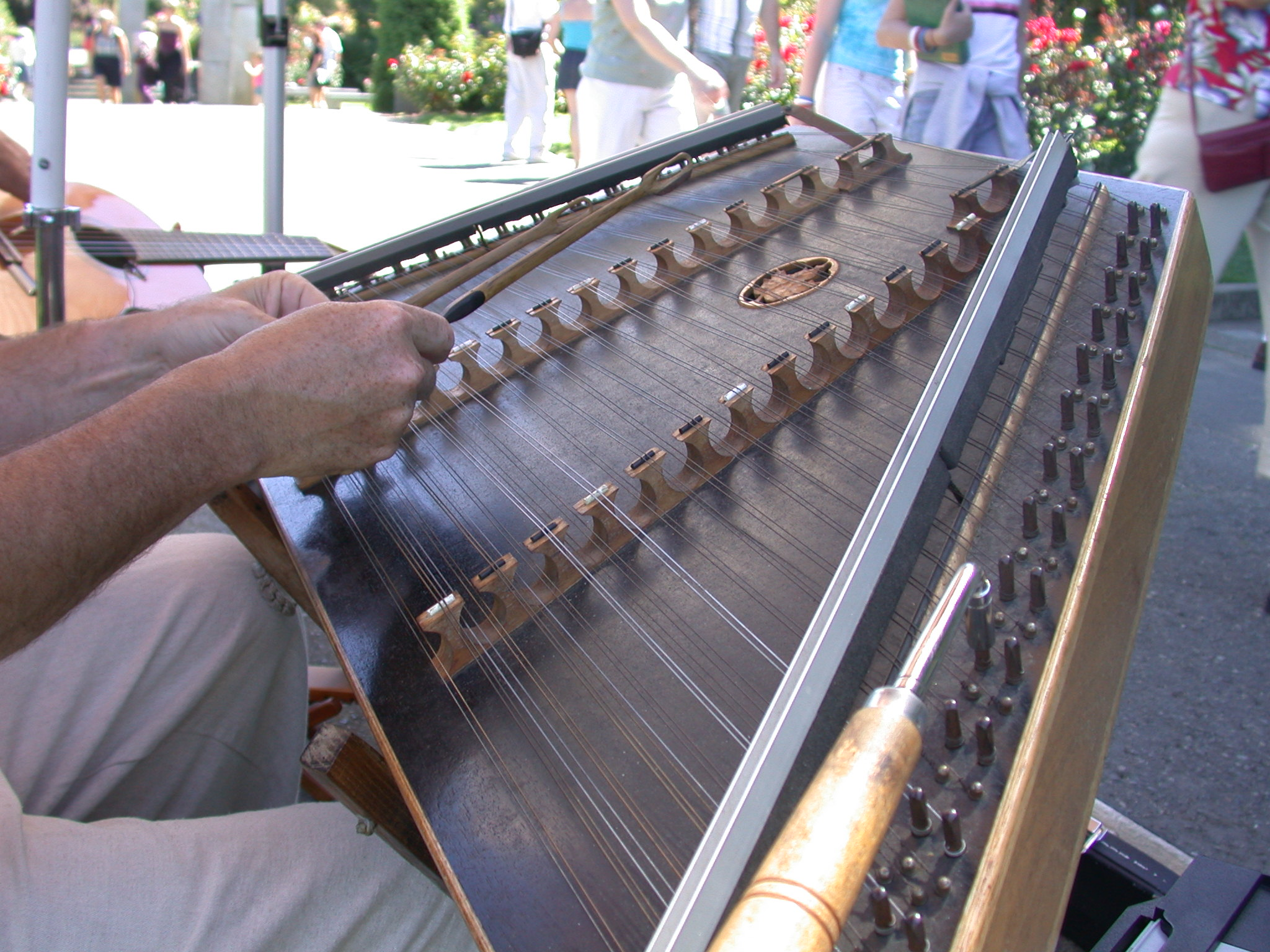
- A musician playing a diatonic hammered dulcimer

String instrument
- Other names: Four-hammer dulcimer; See § Adaptations around the world
- Classification: Percussion instrument (chordophone), string instrument
- Hornbostel–Sachs classification: 314.122-4 (Simple chordophone sounded by hammers)
- Developed: Antiquity

Related instruments
- Appalachian dulcimer; Autoharp; Cimbalom; Psaltery; Tambourine de Bearn; Zither

Sound sample
- Concertino for Santur and Orchestra, by Faramarz Payvar and Hossein Dehlavi.

Hammered dulcimers (also: hammer dulcimers) are percussion-string instruments that share a common build of string-stretched trapezoidal resonant sound boards struck with small spoon-like mallets or hammers in each hand to produce sound. These dulcimers may be played either with the performer traditionally cross-legged on the floor, or in the dulcimer propped on a wooden-legged support. These dulcimers have existed across civilizations as early as the Persian santur; the kind common to medieval Western music is an evolution of the psaltery, in which the strings are plucked.

Hammered dulcimers and other similar instruments are traditionally played in Iraq, India, Iran, Southwest Asia, China, Korea, and parts of Southeast Asia, Central Europe (Hungary, Slovenia, Romania, Slovakia, Poland, Czech Republic, Switzerland [particularly Appenzell], Austria and Bavaria), the Balkans, Eastern Europe (Ukraine and Belarus), and Scandinavia. The instrument is also played in the United Kingdom (Wales, East Anglia, Northumbria), and the United States, where its traditional use in folk music saw a revival in the late 20th century.

== History ==
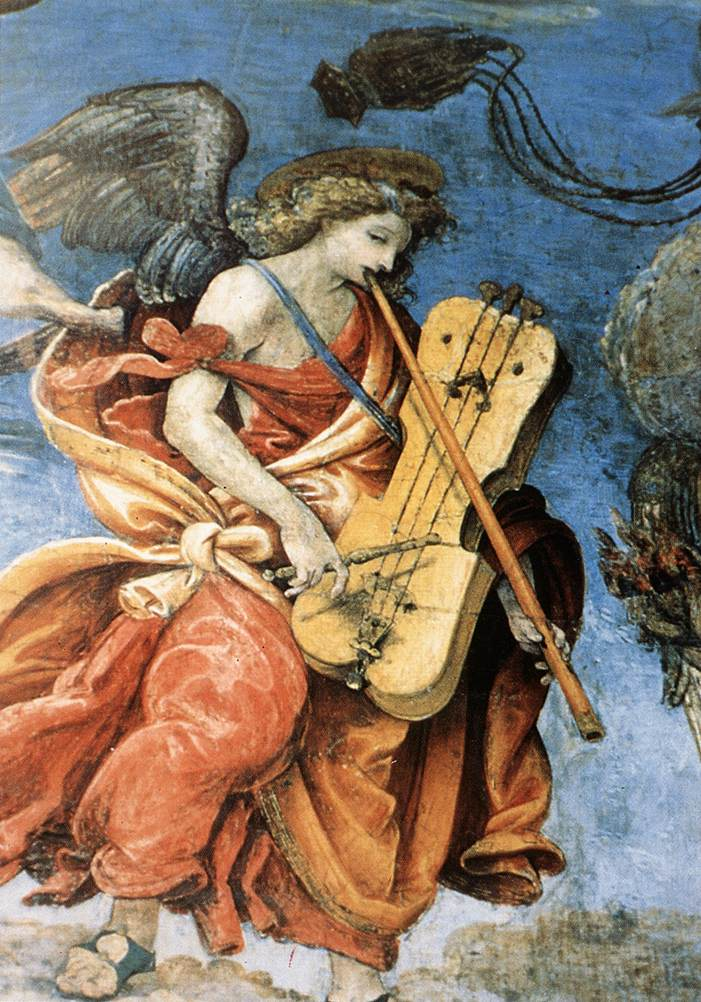
An angel playing a dulcimer and pipe in the c. 1490 fresco Assumption of Mary by Filippino Lippi at Santa Maria sopra Minerva

The earliest dulcimer is the santur originating from the Middle East: earliest evidence comes from Assyrian and Babylonian stone carvings dated to 669 BC, showing the instrument being played while hanging from the player's neck. This original santur was likely made with wood and stone strung with goat intestines, the instrument traded and travelled to different parts of the Middle East, with local musicians gradually modifying the original design over the centuries yielding a wide array of musical scales and tunings.

=== Adaptations around the world ===
The santoor was spread directly through the Middle East in various forms via cultural transmissions in contact with the Islamic world like the Ottomans:

- Afghanistan – santur
- Bangladesh – santoor
- Greece – Σαντούρι
- Pakistan and India – Santoor
- Iran – santur
- Iraq – santur
- Serbia – santur (сантур)
- Turkey – santur

The santur was also spread to the Sinosphere via the Chinese yangqin (扬琴, formerly 洋琴 "foreign qin") during the late Ming era:

- Korea – yanggeum (양금)
- Indochina – khim (Thai: ขิม; Lao: ຂິມ; Khmer: ឃឹម)
- Mongolia – yoochin (ёочин or ёчин)
- Tibet – rgyud-mang or yangzi (རྒྱུད་མང་, lit. "many strings")
- Vietnam – đàn tam thập lục (lit. "36 strings")

In Western Europe, a hammered dulcimer first appears in textual and iconographic sources from the early 15th century. The hammered dulcimer was extensively used during the Middle Ages in England and most of Western Europe with names derivant of Latin psalterium ("psaltery"):

- Portugal and the Lusosphere: salterio
- Spain and former colonies: salterio
- Italy – salterio

Others were transmitted under variants of the cimbalom from Latin cymbalum:

- Belarus – цымбал tsymbaly
- Croatian – cimbal, cimbale, cimbule
- Czech Republic – cimbál
- France – tympanon
- Germany – Zymbal
- Hungary – cimbalom
- Ireland – tiompan
- Latgalia (Latvia) – cymbala
- Latvia – cimbole
- Lithuania – cimbalai, cimbolai
- Poland – cymbały
- Romania – țambal
- Russia – цимбалы chimbaly
- Slovakia – cimbal
- Slovenia – cimbale, oprekelj
- Ukraine – tsymbaly (цимбали)
- Yiddish – tsimbl

Germanic nations:

- Austria, Germany and Switzerland – Hackbrett
- Belgium – hakkebord
- Denmark – hakkebræt
- Netherlands – hakkebord
- Norway – hakkebrett
- Sweden – hackbräde, hammarharpa

The Graeco-Roman word dulcimer ('sweet song') derives from Latin dulcis ('sweet') and the Greek melos (μέλος, 'song').

- Israel – דולצימר dultzimar
- Japan – darushimaa (ダルシマー)
- Russia – dultsimer (дульцимер)
- Hispanosphere – dulcémele

== Strings and tuning ==
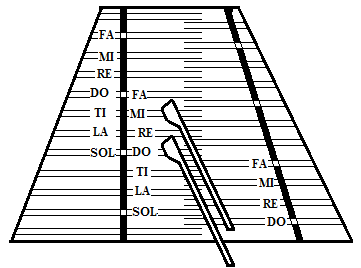
Major scale pattern on a diatonic hammered dulcimer tuned in 5ths

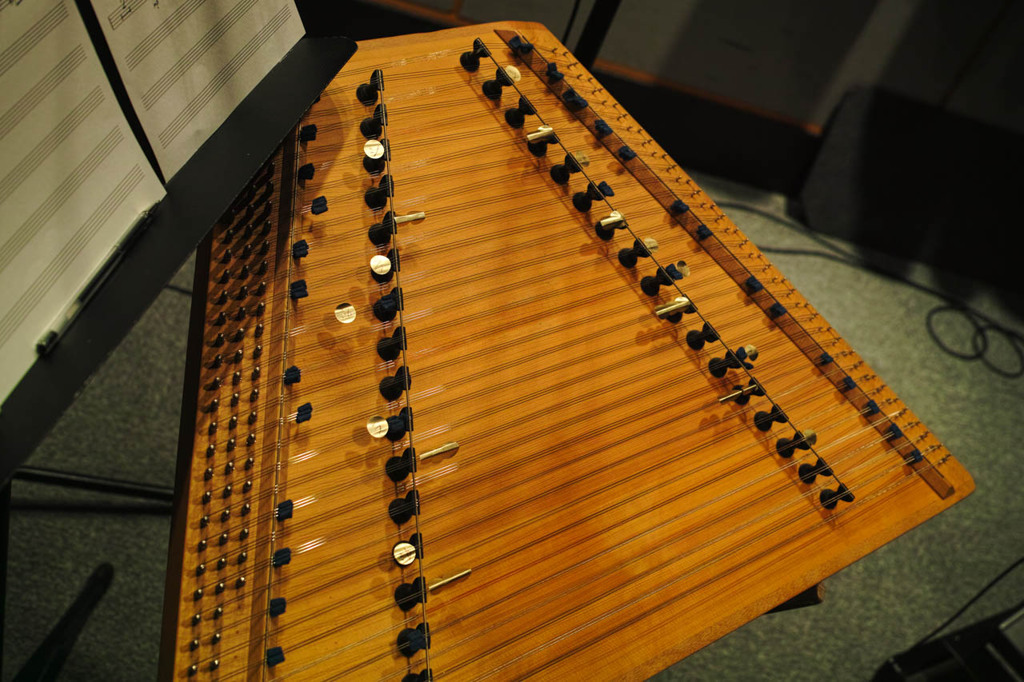
The Salzburger hackbrett, a chromatic version

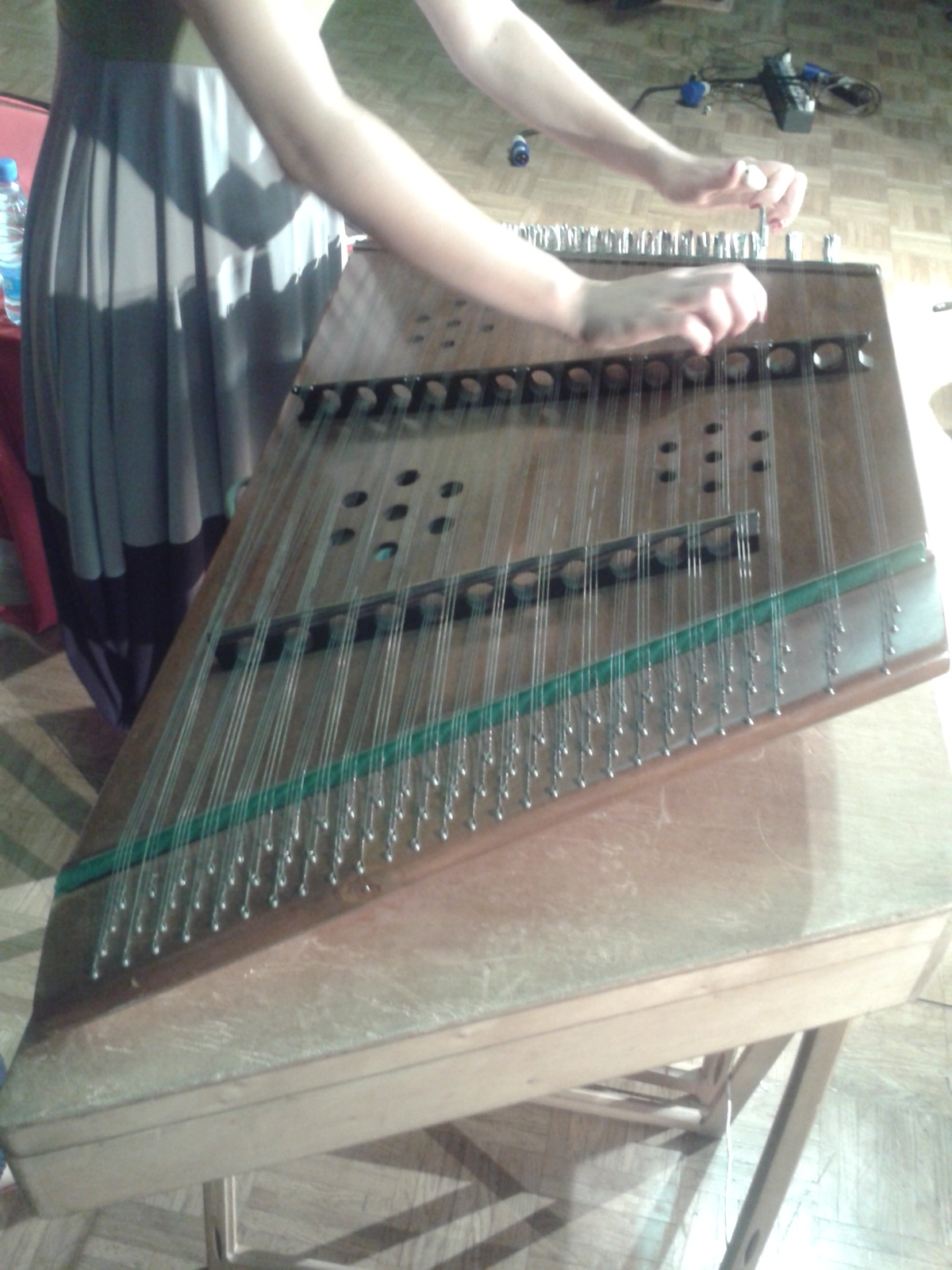
Tuning of a hammered dulcimer (southeastern Slovenia)

A dulcimer usually has two bridges, a bass bridge near the right and a treble bridge on the left side. The bass bridge holds up bass strings, which are played to the left of the bridge. The treble strings can be played on either side of the treble bridge. In the usual construction, playing them on the left side gives a note a fifth higher than playing them on the right of the bridge.

The dulcimer comes in various sizes, identified by the number of strings that cross each of the bridges. A 15/14, for example, has 15 strings crossing the treble bridge and 14 crossing the bass bridge, and can span three octaves. The strings of a hammered dulcimer are usually found in pairs, two strings for each note (though some instruments have three or four strings per note). Each set of strings is tuned in unison and is called a course. As with a piano, the purpose of using multiple strings per course is to make the instrument louder, although as the courses are rarely in perfect unison, a chorus effect usually results like a mandolin. The strings of the hammered dulcimer are wound around tuning pins with square heads (ordinarily, 5 mm "zither pins" are used, similar to, but smaller in diameter than piano tuning pins, which come in various sizes ranging upwards from "1/0" or 7 mm), and tuning requires a wrench as for an autoharp, harp, or piano.

The strings of the hammered dulcimer are often tuned according to a circle of fifths pattern. Typically, the lowest note (often a G or D) is struck at the lower right-hand of the instrument, just to the left of the right-hand (bass) bridge. As a player strikes the courses above in sequence, they ascend following a repeating sequence of two whole steps and a half step. With this tuning, a diatonic scale is broken into two tetrachords, or groups of four notes. For example, on an instrument with D as the lowest note, the D major scale is played starting in the lower-right corner and ascending the bass bridge: D – E – F♯ – G. This is the lower tetrachord of the D major scale. At this point the player returns to the bottom of the instrument and shifts to the treble strings to the right of the treble bridge to play the higher tetrachord: A – B – C♯ – D. The player can continue up the scale on the right side of the treble bridge with E – F♯ – G – A – B, but the next note will be C, not C♯, so he or she must switch to the left side of the treble bridge (and closer to the player) to continue the D major scale. See the drawing on the left above, in which "DO" would correspond to D (see Movable do solfège).

The shift from the bass bridge to the treble bridge is required because the bass bridge's fourth string G is the start of the lower tetrachord of the G scale. The player could go on up a couple notes (G – A – B), but the next note will be a flatted seventh (C natural in this case), because this note is drawn from the G tetrachord. This D major scale with a flatted seventh is the mixolydian mode in D.

The same thing happens as the player goes up the treble bridge – after getting to La (B in this case), one has to go to the left of the treble bridge. Moving from the left side of the bass bridge to the right side of the treble bridge is analogous to moving from the right side of the treble bridge to the left side of the treble bridge.

The whole pattern can be shifted up by three courses, so that instead of a D-major scale one would have a G-major scale, and so on. This transposes one equally tempered scale to another. Shifting down three courses transposes the D-major scale to A-major, but of course the first Do-Re-Mi would be shifted off the instrument.

This tuning results in most, but not all, notes of the chromatic scale being available. To fill in the gaps, many modern dulcimer builders include extra short bridges at the top and bottom of the soundboard, where extra strings are tuned to some or all of the missing pitches. Such instruments are often called "chromatic dulcimers" as opposed to the more traditional "diatonic dulcimers".

The tetrachord markers found on the bridges of most hammered dulcimers in the English-speaking world were introduced by the American player and maker Sam Rizzetta in the 1960s.

In the Alps there are also chromatic dulcimers with crossed strings, which are in a whole tone distance in every row. This chromatic Salzburger hackbrett was developed in the mid 1930s from the diatonic hammered dulcimer by Tobi Reizer and his son along with Franz Peyer and Heinrich Bandzauner. In the postwar period it was one of the instruments taught in state-sponsored music schools.

Hammered dulcimers of non-European descent may have other tuning patterns, and builders of European-style dulcimers sometimes experiment with alternate tuning patterns.

== Hammers ==
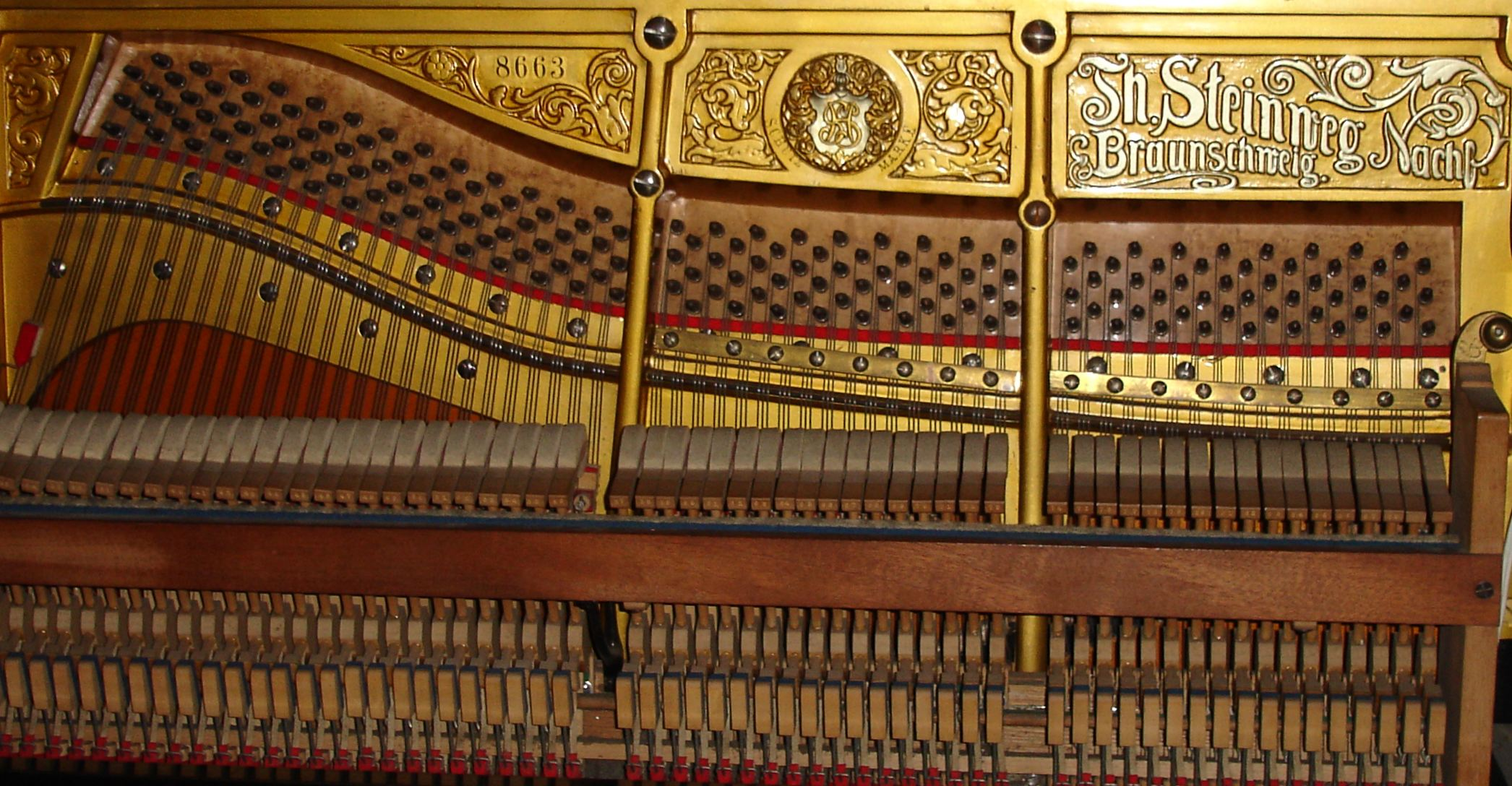
A piano hammering action

Hammers are usually made of wood (most likely hardwoods such as maple, cherry, padauk, oak, walnut, or any other hardwood), but can also be made from any material, including metal and plastic. In the Western hemisphere, hammers are usually stiff, but in Asia, flexible hammers are often used. The head of the hammer can be left bare for a sharp attack sound, or can be covered with adhesive tape, leather, or fabric for a softer sound. Two-sided hammers are also available. The heads of two-sided hammers are usually oval or round. Most of the time, one side is left as bare wood while the other side may be covered in leather or a softer material such as piano felt.

Several traditional players have used hammers that differ substantially from those in common use today. Paul Van Arsdale (1920–2018), a player from upstate New York, used flexible hammers made from hacksaw blades, with leather-covered wooden blocks attached to the ends (these were modeled after the hammers used by his grandfather, Jesse Martin). The Irish player John Rea (1915–1983) used hammers made of thick steel wire, which he made himself from old bicycle wheel spokes wrapped with wool. Billy Bennington (1900–1986), a player from Norfolk, England, used cane hammers bound with wool.

The piano, like the dulcimer, uses a hammering action to strike the strings.

== See also ==
- List of hammered dulcimer players
