= Aged Care Channel =

Educational TV content provider

Aged Care Channel or ACC is an educational care provider based in the United Kingdom and Australia. ACC uses high-quality TV programs to provide education to health professionals and social care staff that work with older people.

ACC was launched in 2003 by the Australian Ministry for Ageing, and was introduced into the United Kingdom in 2009.

== History ==
ACC was founded by Andrew Ricker and Paul Bennett, who had developed the use of interactive satellite television during the 1980s for the training of doctors and pharmacists. Initially they set up TV training networks in Australia, and in 2003 they turned their focus to that of Elder Care. After success in Australia, they were invited to set up a similar version for use in the United Kingdom.

== Timeline ==
- 1992 - The directors co-founded the Rural Health Satellite Network and established HTN as a (not for profit) Public Education Institution.
- 1998 - HTN founds the Health Channel, enabling health professionals' access to health education programs directly into their homes.
- 2003 - Aged Care Channel Pty Ltd is established by HTN
- 2009 - ACC UK is launched under Aged Care Channel Pty Ltd

== See also ==
- Bluebird Care
