= Minstead Training Trust =

The Minstead Training Trust and Furzey Gardens are part of a charitable organisation that provides support for adults with learning disabilities to achieve greater independence and lead meaningful lives as full citizens in society. Minstead Trust has 320 people that are supported to make jam, enjoy crafts, do woodwork, make movies, create a newspaper and look after the gardens.

In 2012, the team from Minstead, together with the garden designer Chris Beardshaw, took the first learning disability team to the RHS Chelsea Flower Show and won an RHS Gold Medal.
