= Chelsea Flower Show =

UK's leading annual garden show (Royal Horticultural Society)

Coordinates: 51°29′11″N 0°9′28″W

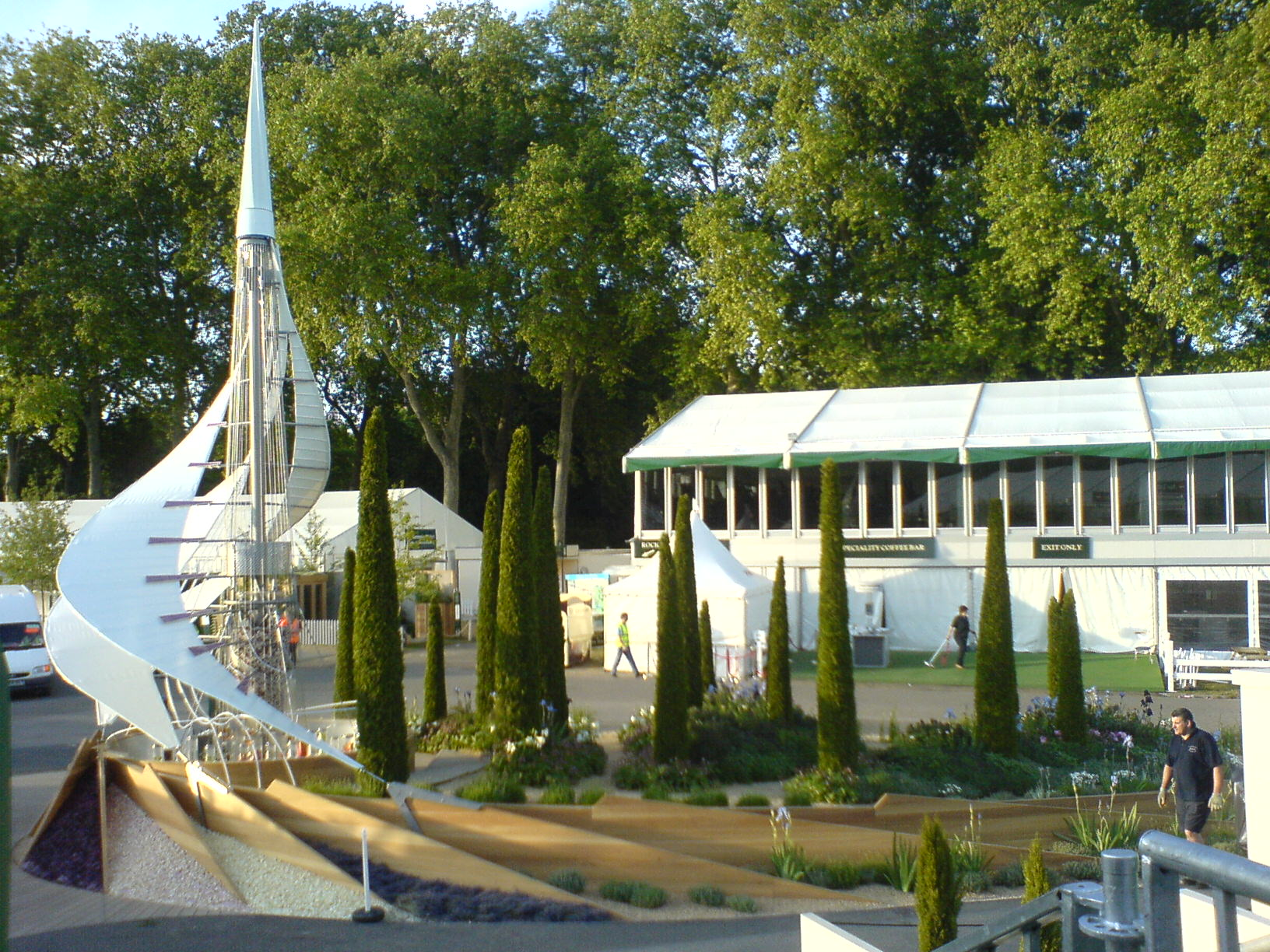
Main pavilion at RHS Chelsea Flower Show 2009

The RHS Chelsea Flower Show, formally known as the Great Spring Show, is a garden show held for five days in May by the Royal Horticultural Society (RHS) in the grounds of the Royal Hospital Chelsea in Chelsea, London. Held at Chelsea since 1912, the show is attended by members of the British royal family.

Highlights to the Chelsea Flower Show include the avant-garde show gardens designed by leading names with Floral Marquee at the centrepiece. The Show also features smaller gardens such as the Artisan and Urban Gardens.

== History ==
=== Great Spring Show ===
The first Royal Horticultural Society Great Spring Show was held in 1862, at the RHS garden in Kensington. Before this date the RHS had held flower shows from 1833 in their garden in Chiswick, which themselves had been preceded by fetes. The Kensington Garden was chosen as a site because the flower shows in Chiswick were experiencing falling visitor numbers due to problems such as poor transport links. The Great Spring Show was held at Kensington for twenty-six years but in 1888 the RHS decided to move the show to the heart of London. The site chosen was the Temple Gardens, situated between the Embankment and Fleet Street, which had a recorded history dating back to 1307 and which were said to date from the time of the Knights Templar. The roses for which these Temple Gardens were famous were alluded to in Shakespeare's Henry VI Part 1. Using three marquees requisitioned from the old Kensington shows, the 1888 show was a success with exhibits from both amateurs and commercial firms. By 1897 five marquees were being used with many of the best known plant and seed merchants being attracted to the event including Suttons and Sons.

=== Royal International Horticultural Exhibition ===
In 1912, the Temple Show was cancelled to make way for the Royal International Horticultural Exhibition. Sir Harry Veitch, the great nurseryman, secured the grounds of the Royal Hospital, Chelsea for this one-off event. It proved such a good site for an exhibition that the Great Spring Show was moved there in 1913, where it has taken place almost every year since. There have been two breaks for world wars.

=== Royal Hospital, Chelsea – early 20th century ===
The RHS first became involved with the Chelsea Hospital in 1905. Three years before, it had leased the grounds of Holland House in Kensington to hold what was first advertised as a Coronation Rose Show, but which turned into a more general show (with not many roses) by the time it actually opened in June. Two further two-day summer shows took place at Holland House in 1903 and 1904, but then, to the general satisfaction of exhibitors and press, a three-day Summer Show was staged in the hospital grounds, a more spacious site than Holland House had allowed, with room for five tents. The Summer Shows reverted to Holland House for the years thereafter, except in 1911, when both it and Chelsea proved unavailable, and the Show was held at the Olympia exhibition hall.

The Royal International Horticultural Exhibition of 1912 used the grounds of Chelsea Hospital as the site for the show, and for 1913, the Great Spring Show was moved there. The first Chelsea Flower Show opened on 20 May. The Summer Show reverted to Holland House. Despite the First World War, the show was held 1914–1916, but was cancelled in 1917 and 1918.

By the 1920s, the Chelsea Flower Show had returned to its previous form; the famous Chelsea tea parties were established and Royal visits resumed. In 1926 the show was held a week late due to the General Strike.

In 1937, King George VI and Queen Elizabeth celebrated their Coronation Year, and an Empire Exhibition was staged to mark the occasion. It featured wattles from Australia, pines from Canada, gladioli from East Africa and even a prickly pear from Palestine.

The show was cancelled during the Second World War, as the land was required by the War Office for an anti-aircraft site. Some doubt arose as to whether the show would resume in 1947. The majority of exhibitors wanted a postponement, as stocks of plants were low, staff much depleted and fuel for greenhouses was obtainable only with special permits, but Lord Aberconway (then RHS President) and the RHS Council felt strongly that the show should resume as soon as possible. The show eventually successfully went ahead in 1947, but with a reduced amount of stands.

In 1951 a show garden based on the Himalayan flora meant that 23 truck loads of plants were borrowed from RHS Wisley.

=== Royal Hospital, Chelsea – later 20th century ===
The Queen attended in 1953, the year of her coronation, and she was also a regular visitor prior to this date with her father, George VI.

The show went on to increase in popularity throughout the second half of the 20th century and crowding became a major problem. Crowding within the tents had been a recurring issue during the interwar years, but was always handled by increasing the number of tents; photographs show heavy crowds in the open, especially in the vicinity of the rock gardens. As the 1970s progressed, attendance at the show climbed by 6,000 visitors in a single year (1978). In 1979, crowding became so severe in the mornings that the turnstiles were temporarily closed. It was decided to open the show at 8 a.m. the next year, and close it at 8.30 p.m. in the evenings, with a reduced price for entry after 4 p.m., to try to draw people away from the morning timeslot; a one-way system was also laid out in the marquee (a solution that had been rejected as impractical 20 years earlier).

The new arrangements for the show were successful in 1980, and a majority of the Council voted for the imposition of a ceiling on the number of tickets sold. However, visitor numbers continued to increase, and in 1987 the turnstiles were closed again. In 1988 a cap had to be placed on the number of visitors attending the show due to problems that were occurring with overcrowding. A limit of 40,000 visitors per day was imposed – a reduction of 90,000 in total from the previous year – and members were charged for tickets for the first time. An immediate response was a fall in attendance; by April, ticket booking was so slow that national advertisements were taken out to encourage people to come to Chelsea, and the original announcement that tickets would not be available at the gates was rescinded.

In response to issues with attendance numbers, the council began to look seriously at the idea of moving the show to a larger venue. Battersea Park, Osterley Park, and Wisley were suggested; one proposal was that Chelsea should be limited to plant sales, and the sundries rerouted elsewhere; the firm Land Use Consultants was also hired to prepare a feasibility study. However, after considering these options, it was concluded that the show should stay at Chelsea. Despite this, the show's programme was expanded into other venues, with the Hampton Court Palace Flower Show taken over in 1993; the increased options for both members and for exhibitors meant that the intense criticisms and conflict of the 1980s over the future of the show did not return.

== Present day ==
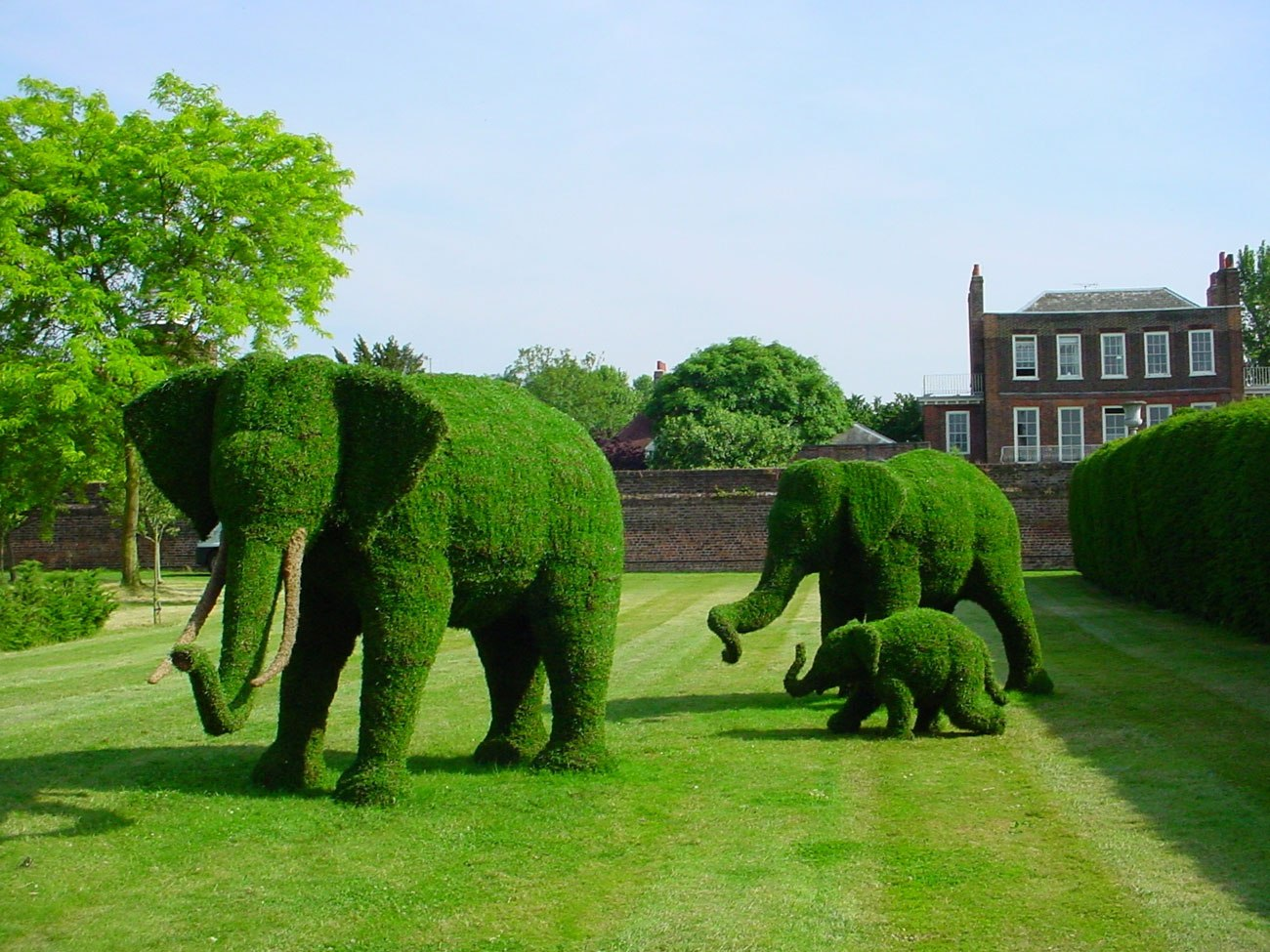
Topiary elephants at the Chelsea Flower Show 2014

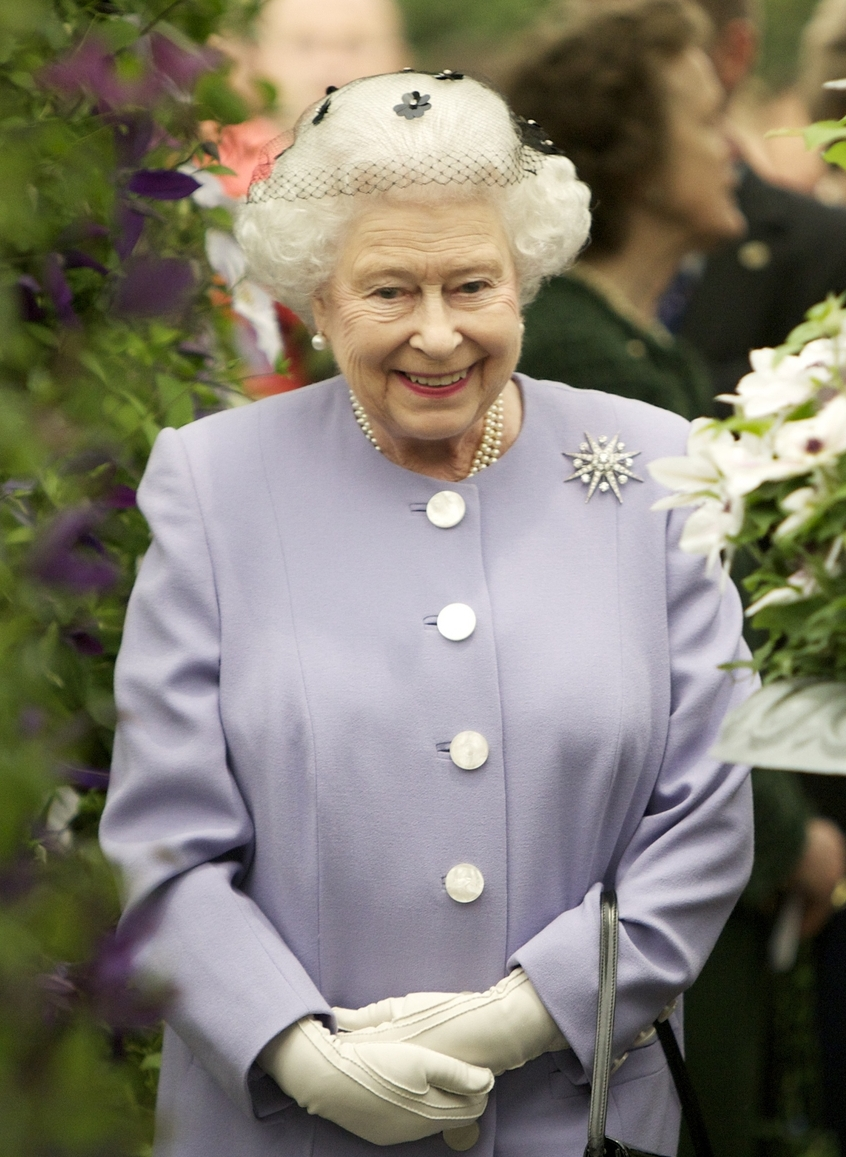
Queen Elizabeth II at the 2012 show

The Chelsea Flower Show is attended by 157,000 visitors each year (a number limited by the capacity of the 11-acre (4.5 ha) ground), and all tickets must be purchased in advance. From 2005 the show was increased from four days to five, with the first two days only open to RHS members. The show is extensively covered on television by the BBC. An official DVD of the show is produced on behalf of the RHS by ONE TWO FOUR. Several members of the British royal family attend a preview of the show, as part of the royal patronage of the RHS. The area of land devoted to show gardens increased steadily between 1970 and 2000 and the show has become an important venue for watching trends. New plants are often launched at the show and the popularity of older varieties revived under the focus of the horticultural world.

Highlights from the 2011 RHS Chelsea Flower Show included The Irish Sky Garden by Diarmuid Gavin, based on the idea of a restaurant in the sky. Other notable gardens included the HESCO Garden by Leeds City Council, who reconstructed an impressive and idyllic working water wheel in the grounds of the Royal Hospital.

The 2011 show also saw the introduction of the new Artisan garden category, which was created for designers who use natural materials.

In 2023, King Charles III and Queen Camilla attended the show and viewed a special display to pay tribute to the life of Queen Elizabeth II and to mark their coronation. Catherine, Princess of Wales, hosted the first children's picnic at a newly created garden at the show with pupils from ten schools from the RHS's school gardening campaign invited.

Since 2022 the show has been sponsored by The Newt in Somerset.

In 2025, daytime coverage was broadcast on BBC One and BBC Two in the evening. The shows were broadcast by a range of gardening experts and broadcasters including Monty Don, Carol Klein, Sue Kent, Sophie Raworth, Angellica Bell, Nicki Chapman, Jo Whiley, Toby Buckland and Frances Tophill.

== Awards ==
There are four grades of award presented – gold, silver-gilt, silver and bronze – in each of the awards categories. Bronze grade exhibits do not actually receive a medal.

=== Awards categories ===
- Flora – Gardens and floral exhibits
- Hogg – Exhibits of trees
- Knightian – Exhibits of vegetables, including herbs
- Lindley – Exhibits of special educational or scientific interest
- Grenfell – Exhibits of pictures, photographs, floral arrangements and floristry

=== Special awards ===
- Best Show Garden Award
- Best Courtyard Garden Award
- Best Chic Garden Award
- Best City Garden Award
- RHS Sundries Bowl
- RHS Junior Display Trophy
- RHS Floral Arrangement Trophies
- RHS Floristry Trophies
- Show Certificates of Merit
- Certificates for Junior Displays
- RHS President's Award
- RHS Best Tradestand Award
- RHS Director General's Award for the Best Tradestand.

== Significant gardens and exhibits ==
- 1929 – Sherman Hoyt's exhibit of American cacti, complete with painted backdrops depicting the Mojave desert, which was acquired for Kew and had its own glasshouse there for over half a century, before being absorbed into the Princess of Wales Conservatory
- 1930s – J. Macdonald's grass gardens, declaring the merits of ornamental grasses
- 1936 – Hilliers' 'Dingley Dell' exhibit
- 1937 – Coronation Year: the Empire Exhibition, with displays of ornamental and economic plants from around the Empire
- 1953 – another Coronation Year: William Wood of Taplow staged a 'Cutty Sark' garden
- 1959 – The Times' 'Garden of Tomorrow', complete with radio-controlled lawn mower
- 1960 – The great orchid display to accompany the Third World Orchid Conference
- 1964 – Popular Gardening's 'Garden of Today'
- 1967 – The first garden for the disabled at Chelsea
- 1968 – Wisley's exhibit of hostas, which gave a great boost to their popularity
- 1980 – Display of penjing from China
- 1982 – Brenda Hyatt's display of auriculas, which launched these plants back into popularity
- 1988 – John Chambers's honeybee garden. This was the last year the Wilkinson Sword for Best Show Garden was awarded.
- 1991 – The RHS reinstated the Best Show Garden Award in conjunction with Fiskars (who were the owners of the Wilkinson brand and were relaunching the brand Fiskars). The new award was the Sword of Excellence and was presented by the RHS President to the Daily Express Garden 'The Forgotten Pavilion' designed by John Van Hage, who became the youngest-ever designer to win a RHS Gold medal at Chelsea.
- 1993 – Julie Toll's seaside garden controversially won the short-lived Fiskars Sword of Excellence for best show garden, described by David Stevens as "a sand dune garden that was well planted and beautiful, but visitors said it wasn't a garden."
- 1994 – Isabel and Julian Bannerman's Daily Telegraph Old Abbey garden with a virtuoso display of mature tree transplanting. The Sunday Express Railway Garden by Julian Dowle was a very popular themed garden featuring Railway artefacts, wild flowers, a vegetable plot and a colourful display of cottage plants.
- 1996 – Dan Pearson's London roof garden for the 1990s
- 1997 – Christopher Bradley-Hole's Latin Garden, the first garden at Chelsea to exhibit the new fashion for sparse planting
- 2000 – The Garden History Society's Le Nôtre Garden, and Piet Oudolf's winning 'Evolution' garden
- 2002 – Mary Reynolds became the youngest garden designer to win a gold medal at the show
- 2004 – Tourism New Zealand presented the first authentic thermal New Zealand garden entitled "Ora Garden of Well-being" winning a gold medal.
- 2009 – James May's Paradise in Plasticine, a garden made entirely of Plasticine. Its concept and creation was documented for James May's Toy Stories.
- 2010 – Kebony Naturally Norway Garden designed by Darren Saines. It was the first time Norway was represented in Chelsea Flower Show with a big show garden. Exotic orchids from Taiwan were presented by the Taiwan Orchid Growers Association (TOGA). This was the first time that Taiwan was invited to the Chelsea Flower Show.
- 2011 – Diarmuid Gavin's Irish Sky Garden. This was the first garden to be suspended in the air.
- 2016 – The largest-ever display in the Great Pavilion – Bowdens Nursery in Devon brought in The British Belmond Pullman Carriage 'Zena' – 63 feet long and 38 tonnes and built a breathtaking display at The Monument Step celebrating plant hunters throughout the world. It was a walk-through exhibition with thousands of plants, hostas, ferns, tree fern and bamboos and hosted 30,000 visitors during the show walking through the train carriage bedecked in art deco luggage and fine glass and crockery. It changed the game for displays in the Pavilion.
- 2016 – A display of 300,000 individually crocheted poppies, covering nearly 2,000 m^{2} (22,000 sq ft), designed by Phillip Johnson and made by over 50,000 contributors.
- 2017 – Bowdens bring The Queen's Australian State Coach to Chelsea and build a display of Commonwealth plants around it.
- 2019 – The Duchess of Cambridge worked with the RHS as one of the co-designers for a garden display at the 2019 Chelsea Flower Show. She designed the "Back to Nature Garden" together with Andree Davies and Adam White. The garden, which featured "a tree house, waterfall, rustic den and a campfire" among other parts, was unveiled at the Chelsea Flower Show in May 2019 to emphasise "the benefits the natural world brings to mental and physical well-being".
- 2022 – The Queen's Platinum Jubilee Garden. Laser-cut steel silhouettes of the Queen were featured, surrounded by 70 planted terracotta pots planted with lily of the valley, the Queen's favourite flower.
- 2023 – Garden of Royal Reflection and Celebration. The garden was created to celebrate Charles III's coronation and instill a sense of calm and reflection about the monarchy.

== See also ==
- Chelsea Fringe
- Tatton Park Flower Show
- Hampton Court Palace Flower Show
- Garden festival
- Cultural icon
