= Bluebird of Chelsea =

1931 motor yacht

History

United Kingdom
- Name: Bluebird
- Builder: Thornycroft, Southampton
- Launched: 1931
- Status: In service

General characteristics
- Class & type: Motor yacht
- Displacement: 23 tons
- Length: 52 ft (16 m)
- Beam: 11 ft (3.4 m)
- Draught: 4 ft 3 in (1.30 m)
- Propulsion: Twin propellers & petrol engines, later Perkins diesels

Bluebird of Chelsea, formerly Blue Bird, is a motor yacht originally built for Sir Malcolm Campbell.

== Ownership by Sir Malcolm Campbell ==
She was built in 1931 by Thornycrofts of Southampton, as a twin petrol-engined wooden carvel-built motor yacht.

Campbell sold her after three years, as his motor-racing experience made him wary of the fire risks of petrol engines aboard. He was also highly superstitious and believed a gypsy warning that, "his death would come from the water". In hindsight, this may have applied more to his son Donald.

== Dunkirk and World War II ==
She had three further owners before being requisitioned by the Admiralty at the outbreak of World War II. She joined the flotilla of "little ships" of the Dunkirk evacuation, though not without two false starts, first due to engine trouble and then over-crowding. Her return from Dunkirk was even more fraught: after first refilling the fuel tanks with water, then fouling her screws on debris, she returned under tow.

Her later wartime service was spent in Scotland performing transport work for the RASC, then later on the South coast around Weymouth and Gosport.

Her history after this is sketchy, although she was renamed Blue Finch and found herself on the Atlantic coast of the South of France.

== Survival today ==
In 1984 the Chelsea art dealer Martin Summers discovered her in France and decided to restore her. Some initial work in France made her apparently fit for a single-engined Channel crossing, but once again another engine failure meant that she returned from France under tow.

H & T Marine (Hiscock and Titterington) of Poole performed an extensive restoration. After re-launch in 1986 she now lies alongside Cadogan Pier in Chelsea.

== Modelling ==
Two 1/12 scale models of Bluebird of Chelsea were featured in a magazine cover article.

A double-sided 1/24 scale plan feature by David Metcalf was included in a Model Boats magazine series in 1989.

== See also ==
- List of Bluebird record-breaking vehicles
