= Mary Reynolds (landscape designer) =

Irish gardener, landscape architect and environmentalist

- Born: ca. 1974
- Education: University College Dublin
- Occupation: Landscape designer
- Known for: Garden designs and environmental activism
- Awards: Gold - 2002 Chelsea Flower Show

Mary Reynolds is an Irish gardener, landscape designer, author and public activist, known for being the youngest contestant to win a gold medal at the Chelsea Flower Show. She currently works as an author, designer and environmentalist, and published her first book The Garden Awakening in 2016. Her career as a landscape designer and latter accomplishments inspired the biographical drama Dare to Be Wild (2016).

== Early life ==
Reynolds was raised on a farm in Wexford, Ireland with her parents and five siblings, of which she is the youngest. Her father, Séan Reynolds, worked as a soil scientist and farmer, while her mother, Teresa, worked as a full-time teacher. In her personal anecdotes, Reynolds claims to have developed her fascination with nature at a young age, often referencing a childhood memory in which she became lost on the family farm and felt the plants around her "leaning towards me […] fighting for my attention. They wanted me to know that they were part of my family." Reynolds studied landscape design at University College Dublin, graduating with a degree in Landscape Horticulture to pursue a career in landscape design.

== Career and achievements ==
=== 2002 Chelsea Flower Show ===
Reynolds' design entry for the 2002 Chelsea Flower Show was delivered to RHS officials wrapped in mint leaves. An excerpt from the text reads; "People travel the world over to visit untouched places of natural beauty, yet modern gardens pay little heed to the simplicity and beauty of these environments." All contestants were required to provide evidence of a £150,000 sponsorship to fund their garden. While Reynolds provided the paperwork and proof of sponsorship, she later confessed; "It was very carefully worded so no actual amount was mentioned; [my sponsors] gave me a pound, so it wasn’t a complete fib." She later secured sufficient sponsorship to construct her garden.

To complete the construction of her garden, Reynolds enlisted the help of Christy Collard and others from Irish gardening business Future Forests. Her design, titled ‘Tearmann sí – A Celtic Sanctuary’, was awarded a gold medal and gained public acclaim nationwide. The installation featured a moon-gate archway, leading down a path to four stone Druid thrones surrounding a fire-bowl placed over a pond. The garden was engulfed by traditional stone dry-walls and supported over 500 native Irish plants, such as hawthorns.

Reynolds' installation was famously visited by Prince Charles, a regular visitor to the Chelsea Flower Show, who talked with Reynolds as they toured her garden.

=== Landscape design ===
Reynolds' designs often feature:

- Spiralling stone walls in the style of the Fibonacci sequence.
- Unkempt native flowers and wildlife, often referred to as forest gardening.
- Stone sculptures in the style of traditional Celtic constructions; obelisks, Druid throne.
- The shapes and patterns of nature.

==== Kew Gardens ====
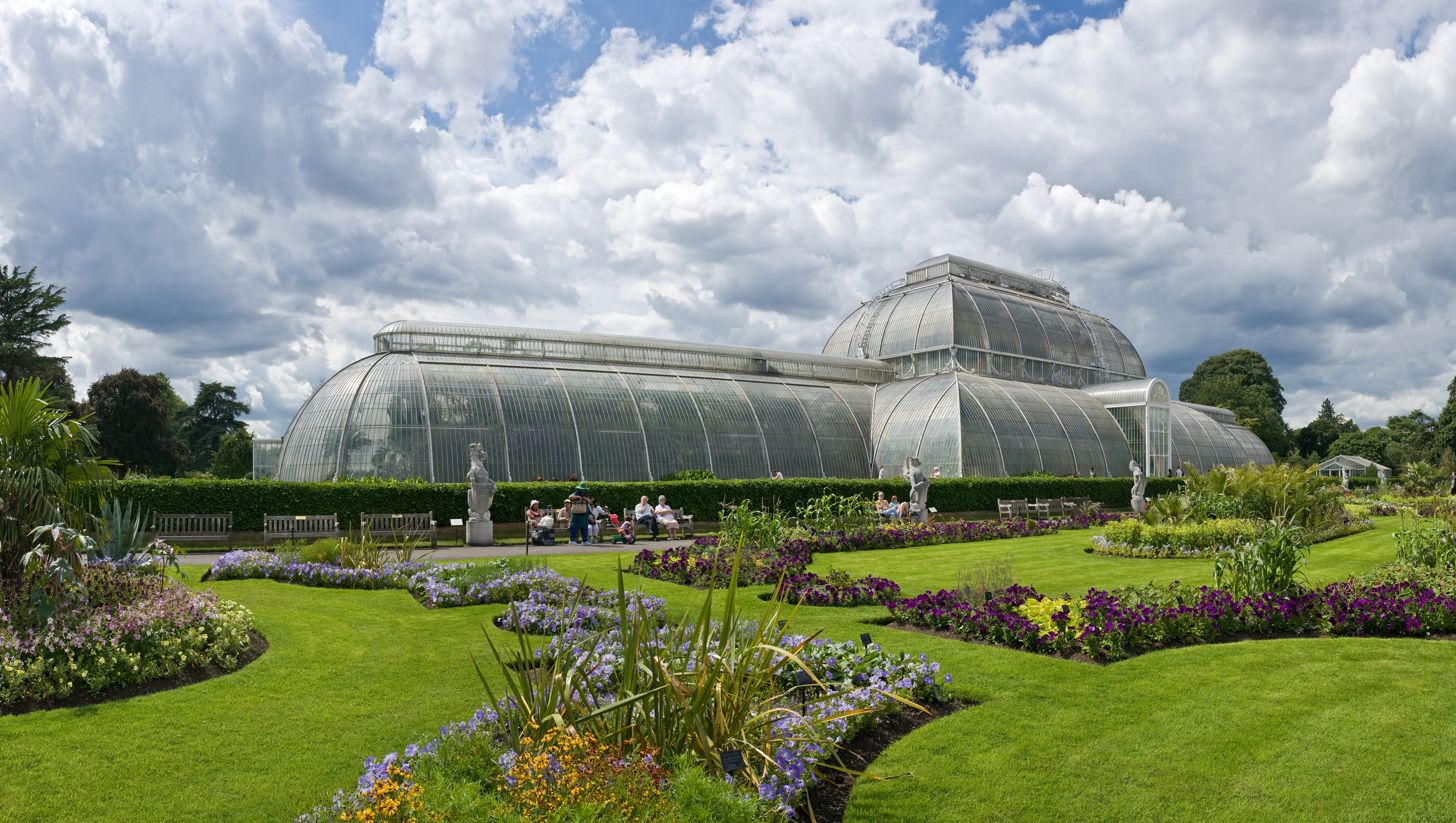
The Palm House in Kew Gardens.

Following her success at the 2002 Chelsea Flower Show, Reynolds was approached by the British government to design a garden for the Royal Botanical Gardens at Kew. Reynolds stated the design was inspired by W. B. Yeats' poem The Stolen Child. It featured a large stone sculpture of a sleeping faerie.

==== Delta Sensory Gardens: Stolen Child Garden ====
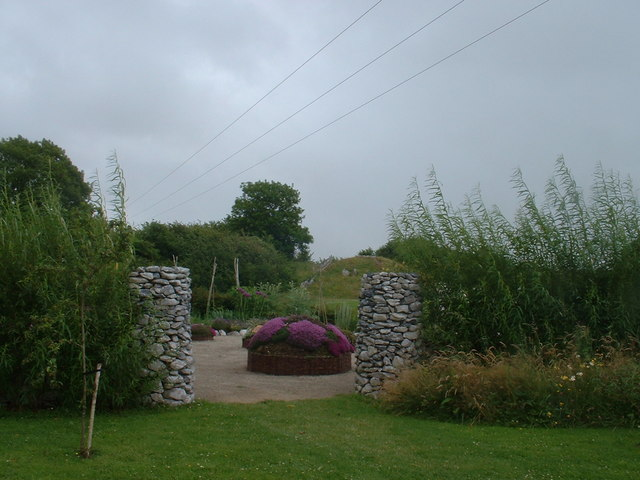
The Lughnasa Autumn Garden in Brigit's Garden.

Reynolds was commissioned to design a garden at the Delta Sensory Gardens, within the Delta Centre in Carlow, Ireland. The garden mimics that at the Royal Kew, as it also features a stone faerie covered in moss, surrounded by a variety of native Irish fauna. The garden also features some topiary sculpture by Irish gardener Martin Monks.

==== Brigit's Garden: Gairdin Bhride ====
Brigit's Garden is located in County Galway, Ireland. The garden was designed by Mary Reynolds under the commission of its founder Jenny Beale. Beale requested the design feature four central gardens, each inspired by the seasonal Celtic festivals of Samhain, Imbolc, Bealtaine, and Lughnasa. Each garden features a sculpture created by local artists, as commissioned by Beale. A limestone wall winds through the whole garden, with the Lughnasa garden featuring circles of limestone obelisks.

==== New Ross Library Park ====
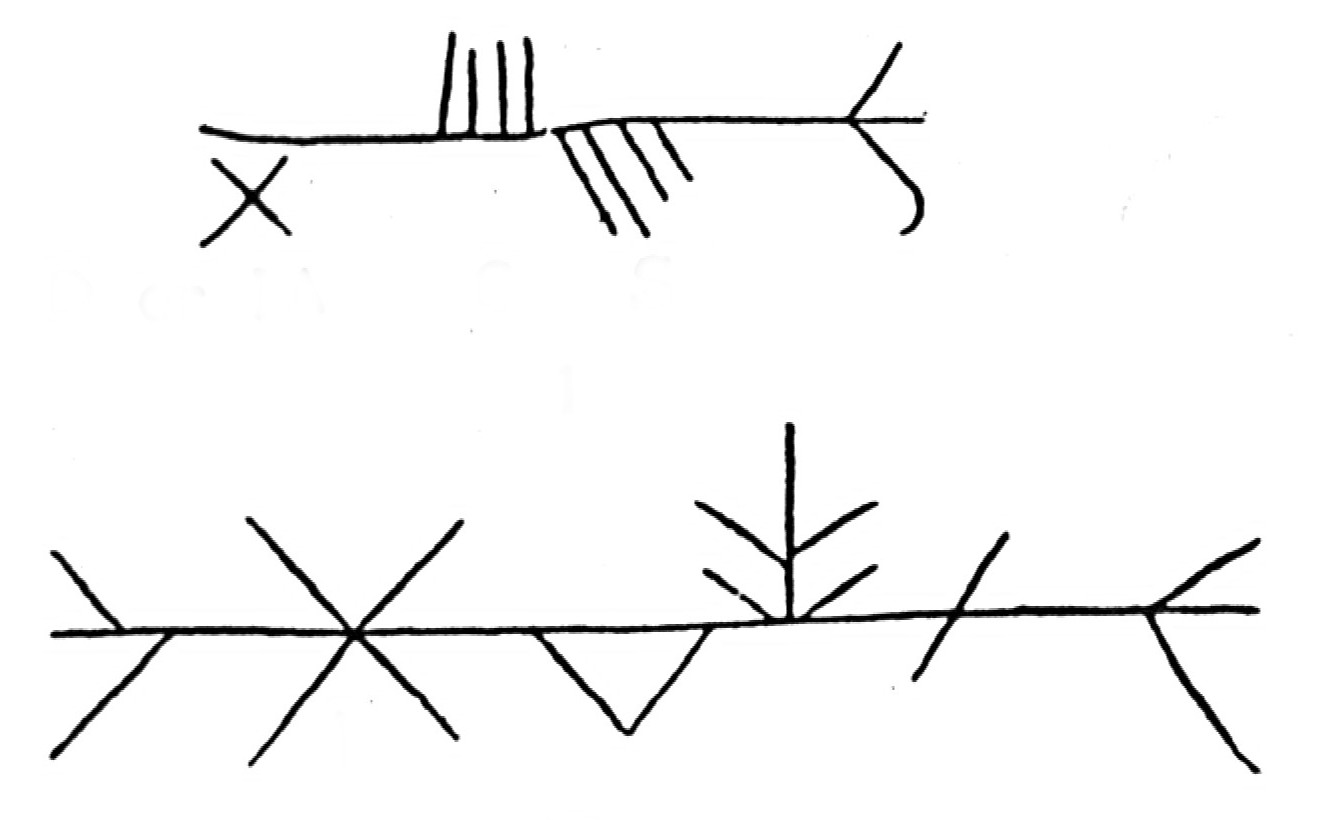
A transcription of an Irish Ogham inscription.

The New Ross Library Park is located in County Wexford, Ireland. The park is inspired by Irish mythology and historical writings. It features a Clog Mór Amphitheatre and a sundial designed by Eamonn Hore and Liam O’Neill the sculptor. The trees planted at the park correlate with the Ogham alphabet that is displayed on a stone walkway.

==== Other projects and commissions ====
- Cornwall Seaside Garden at the Camel Quarry House in Cornwall, England: designed a terraced spiralled stone-wall.
- Celtic Gardens at the Monart Destination Spa in County Wexford, Ireland: features stone bridges and a terraced waterfall.
- The Convent Gardens and The Tree Of Life Garden at the Díseart Visitor Centre in County Kerry, Ireland.
- The 'Buncloch' or Foundation Stone garden at Farmleigh House, in Castleknock, Dublin, Ireland: features a small garden commemorating the Proclamation of the Irish Republic of 1916.
- Rooftop penthouse gardens in Dublin, Ireland: features fully irrigated garden terraces filled with assorted plants and trees.

== Publications ==
=== The Garden Awakening: Designs to Nurture the Land and Ourselves (2016) ===
Reynolds' first publication is an instructional memoir in which she promotes sustainable horticultural practice through "forest gardening", while also detailing her spiritual connection to the Irish landscape through the terms and symbols of Celtic paganism. In her text Reynolds covers the practice of permaculture and natural farming, foraging, keeping poultry, composting, and beekeeping. The book features illustrations by artist Ruth Evans, alongside drawings and architectural sketches by Reynolds, and a foreword by US author Larry Korn.

The publication was publicly endorsed by fellow activist and anthropologist Jane Goodall, who stated the book helped guide readers to be "in tune with nature" and give their gardens a "sense of home". Other notable figures who shared their support of Reynold's writing include Sir Tim Smit, Co-Founder of the Eden Project; and James Alexander-Sinclair, judge and council member of the Royal Horticultural Society.

== Views and activism ==
=== Celtic paganism ===
In both her writings and interviews, Reynolds often refers to her Celtic heritage in regards to the magic and energies found in nature. In an interview with the Irish Examiner, Reynolds stated she is not religious, but found her faith in nature. She also makes use of traditional Celtic symbols and folklore in her landscape designs; such as Druid thrones, obelisks and her sleeping faerie sculpture at the Delta Sensory Garden. In April 2019 on the Cultivating Place podcast Reynolds made many statements in regards to her experiences in nature, calling her garden "a universal post box that you can send your wishes and intentions out from", and comparing the process of gardening to "knitting or weaving a magic spell" which can allow "the land to become healed".

Reynolds also makes use of traditional Celtic terminology in her writings and designs, such as those featured at Brigit's Garden.

=== Environmentalism ===
Reynolds is an active figure in the Irish Environmentalism community, acknowledged for her efforts in promoting sustainable living through publicly available interviews and workshops. In 2017 she worked as a course instructor at the Irish National Heritage Park in Wexford, her efforts focussing on restoring or "healing" the land to its natural, wild state.

==== Rewilding ====
We Are The Ark was founded by Reynolds in 2018 with the aim of creating international environmental activism in regards to rewilding land by returning gardens to nature in order to increase biodiversity. Reynolds felt spurred to start the trend when observing local fauna leaving a site being used for development. Her website directs participants to build a natural haven in which native plants and fauna is allowed to flourish in a self-sustaining environment.

== In media ==
Reynolds has appeared in the following online podcasts and tele-seminar;

- Cultivating Place: Episode 166: Daring To Be Wild - We ARE The Ark - With Irish Plantswoman, Mary Reynolds; from 26 April 2019.
- The Irish Times Róisin Meets: Mary Reynolds, award-winning gardener; from May 2016.
- Organisation of Nature Evolutionaries: Remembering Our Roles as Guardians of Our Land; from 20 January 2019.
- Thin Places Travel Podcast: Episode 10: Awaken the Land with Mary Reynolds; from 21 April 2018.
- Urban Farm: Episode 341: Mary Reynolds on Care of Earth, Food and Nature; from 3 April 2018.
- Farm On Podcast: Episode 20: Rebuilding Shattered Hearts with Mary Reynolds; from November 2017.
- Unclassified Woman: Episode 53: The Garden Awakening with Mary Reynolds; from November 2017.
- Being Boss: Episode 120: Nurture Your Land (And Yourself) With Mary Reynolds; from 18 April 2017.
- Japan Times: Mary Reynolds Say Gardeners Should Take a Walk on the Wild Side
- Smithsonian Magazine: The Unlikely, Charming Designer Who is Changing the Face of Gardening
- Publishers Weekly: Non Fiction Book Review of the Garden Awakening: Designs To Nurture Our Land and Ourselves
- Architectural Digest Spain: Top 10 Landscapers
- RTE Radio 1 Marian Finucane Interview about Dare To Be Wild
- Land 8 - Landscape Architects Network: 7 Female Landscape Architects You Need To Know About
- The Irish Times: How To 'Rewild' Your Garden For The Good Of The Planet

In November 2016 Reynolds held a seminar at the TEDxWexford conference. Her presentation was titled "The Garden Awakening" a featured processes of garden design and planning as further detailed in her publication, released earlier that same year.

Reynolds landscape design at Brigit's Garden was featured in the MoMoWo Exhibit, a programme co-funded by the Creative Europe Programme of the European Union which highlights the achievements of 'European women in architecture and design'.

=== Dare to be Wild ===
The feature-length film premiered in March 2015 at the Jameson International Film Festival in Dublin. It features actors Emma Greenwell and Tom Hughes. The film is a biographical drama of Reynolds’ life leading up to and through the 2002 Chelsea Flower Show, and features scenes and sets that were recreated from photos, including a full physical re-installation of Reynolds’ award-winning Celtic Sanctuary. It is directed by environmentalist Vivienne De Courcy, who was inspired to create the film after she and Reynolds became friends following a garden design commission.

′′Dare to Be Wild′′ was shown in ninety UK cinemas, with screenings in fifteen South Korean theatres and 638 internationally. It has since been made available on Netflix in North America.

== Personal life ==
She publicly acknowledges a former relationship with Christy Collard, a green build architect who assisted Reynolds in creating her award-winning Celtic Sanctuary. Reynolds was eager for his assistance in her design, and so followed Collard to his reforestation project in Ethiopia, resulting in a brief romance that was depicted in the biopic Dare to be Wild.
