= Bluebird Care =

British home care franchise

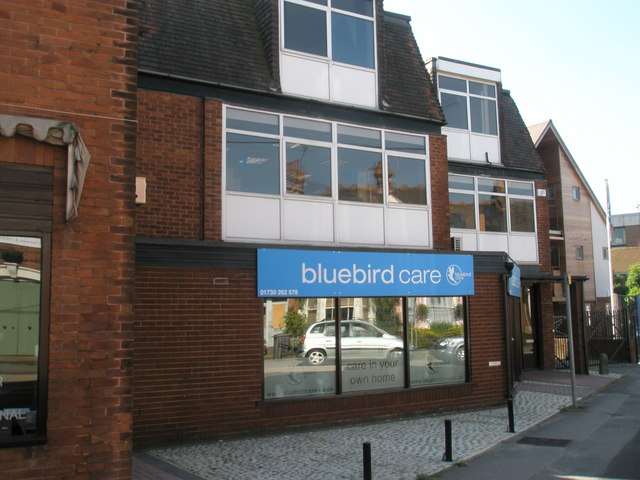
- Bluebird Care Petersfield
- Named after: Bluebird record-breaking vehicles
- Formation: 2004; 22 years ago
- Founder: Paul Tarsey; Lisa Tarsey
- Headquarters: Petersfield, Hampshire
- Coordinates: 51.0058°N 0.9403°W
- Region served: United Kingdom; Republic of Ireland
- Services: Home care
- Key people: Yvonne Hignell
- Parent organization: Interim Healthcare
- Website: www.bluebirdcare.co.uk

Bluebird Care is a franchise and brand providing home care services to the United Kingdom and the Republic of Ireland. The company has just over 200 franchises covering areas in the United Kingdom and a further 26 in the Republic of Ireland.

== History ==
The company was founded in 2004 by Paul and Lisa Tarsey initially as a local health care provider in Petersfield, but always with the intention of expanding via franchising. The state of the market allowed rapid expansion up to around 2010 with at times a new franchise being established every 14 days. The name "Bluebird" derived from the Tansey family connection to the Campbell family and their Bluebird record-breaking vehicles.

In 2013 it was bought out by Florida-based Interim Healthcare, an enterprise that operated over seven countries and claimed "combined network sales of $850m" by 2015.

In June 2020 it acquired the Irish master franchise business from Clemac Home Care Services.

As of 2019 managing director Yvonne Hignell says the company has just over 200 active franchises (in the United Kingdom) and a further 26 in the Republic of Ireland.

In March 2022 care assistants employed by the offices in Exeter, Exmouth, East Devon, and North & West Devon were given a 17% pay rise because of their “heroic efforts” throughout the pandemic and in hopes to attract more care assistants into the industry.

The Winchester, Eastleigh & Romsey branch got a second five-star Outstanding rating from the Care Quality Commission in May 2022- one of only three care providers in the country to do so.

Carolyn and Keith Dailey started with Bluebird Care Newmarket & Fenland and have since acquired further franchises in Cambridge and Bedford.

== See also ==
- Private healthcare in the United Kingdom
