= Bluebird record-breaking vehicles =

Set of land and water speed records

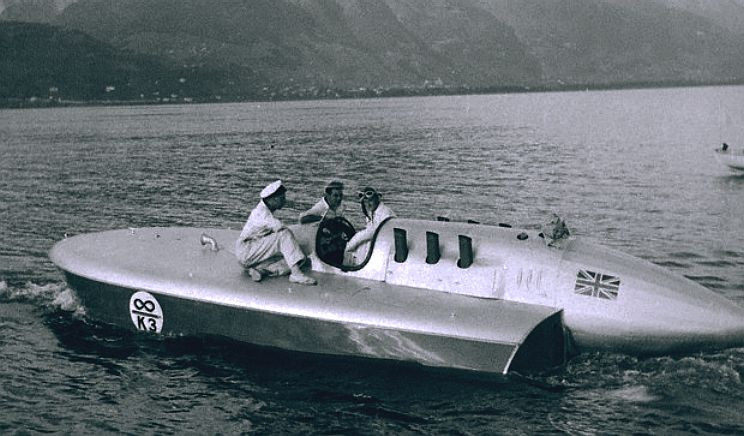
The Blue Bird K3

Blue Bird or Bluebird is the name of various cars and boats used by Sir Malcolm Campbell, his son Donald and other family members to set land and water speed records.

== Origins of the name ==
The name Blue Bird was originally inspired by the play of that name by Maurice Maeterlinck and so the vehicles were painted a shade of azure blue.

Malcolm Campbell had a succession of Darracq racing cars in the 1920s, which in the fashion of the day he had named 'Flapper I' , 'Flapper II' and 'Flapper III' . It was 'Flapper III' which he renamed after seeing the play, famously and impetuously knocking up a paint shop owner at night, so as to purchase blue paint before racing at Brooklands the following day.

In 1925, he also raced an Itala at Brooklands with the name 'The Blue Bird' painted on the bonnet.

== Bluebird or Blue Bird? ==
Malcolm Campbell named them "Blue Bird", Donald "Bluebird".

The hydroplane K4 began life as Malcolm's "Blue Bird", but when Donald decided to use her in 1949, after his father's death, he renamed her "Bluebird".

== Cars ==
=== Sir Malcolm Campbell ===
Campbell broke nine land speed records between 1924 and 1935, with three at Pendine Sands and five at Daytona Beach. The final record was set at the Bonneville Salt Flats, Utah, in 1935. For completeness, earlier cars raced by Campbell and named 'Blue Bird' are also listed here. Dates are indicative only.

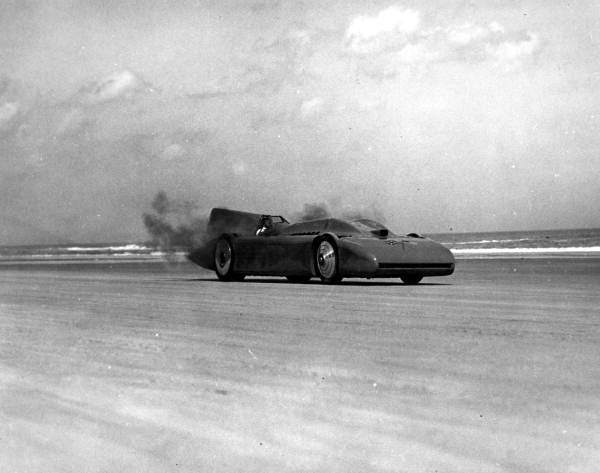
Campbell-Railton Blue Bird

- 1906 Blue Bird; Darracq 10½ litre, originally named 'Flapper'
- 1911 Blue Bird II; Darracq "Four-inch" BJ-578
- 1912 Blue Bird; Lorraine-Dietrich (race number 5)
- 1913 Blue Bird III; Darracq "Four-inch" LN-870 (race number 2)
- 1922 The Blue Bird; Itala 2-litre (race number 5)
- 1923 Blue Bird; Sunbeam 350HP
- 1927 Blue Bird II; Napier-Campbell Blue Bird; Napier Lion V engine (ca 500hp)
- 1928 Blue Bird III; Napier-Campbell Blue Bird; rebuilt with Napier Lion VIIA engine (ca 900hp)
- 1931 Blue Bird IV; Campbell-Napier-Railton Blue Bird
- 1933 Blue Bird V; Campbell-Railton Blue Bird: rebuilt with Rolls-Royce R engine (#R37)
- Chrysler Six Model B-70 1925

=== Donald Campbell ===
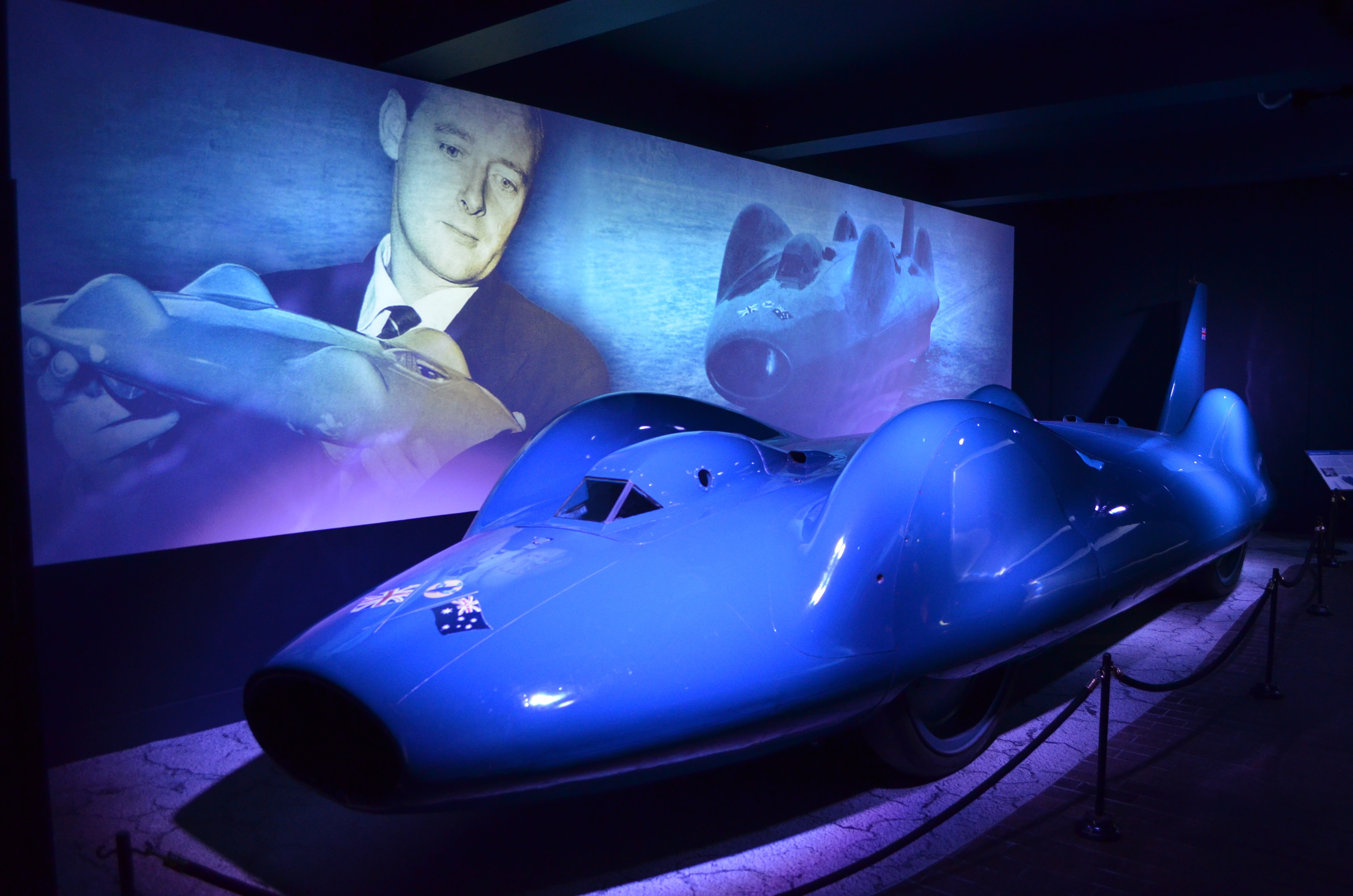
Bluebird-Proteus CN7

- Bluebird-Proteus CN7
- Bluebird Mach 1.1 (CMN-8) never built

=== Donald Wales ===
Donald Wales, grandson of Malcolm Campbell and nephew of Donald Campbell, has contested the world electric powered land speed record. He was also the test driver for the British Steam Car Inspiration, which broke the steam-powered land speed record. He was also the driver for Project Runningblade, setting the world land speed record for a lawnmower.

- Bluebird Electric 2

== Boats ==
=== Sir Malcolm Campbell ===
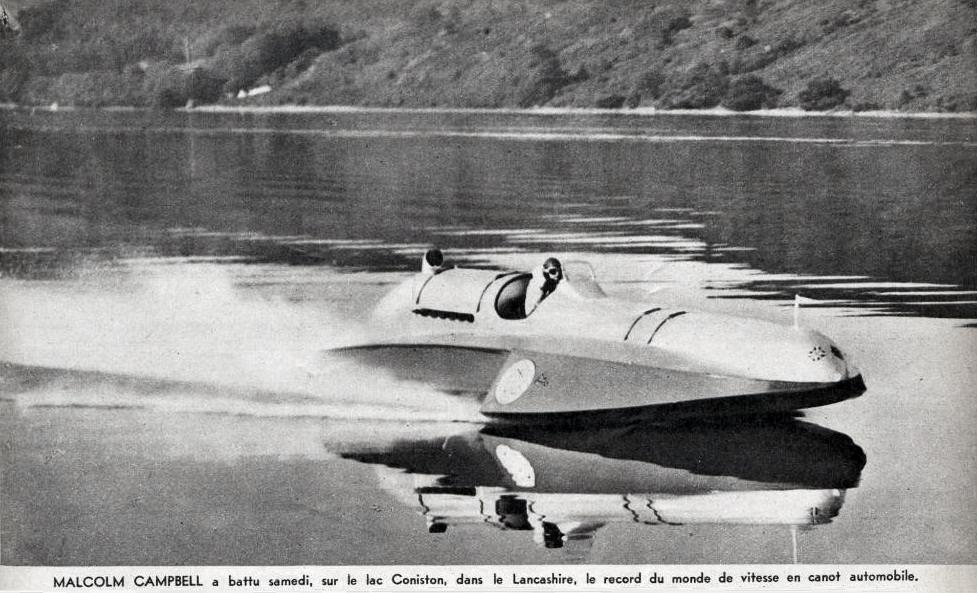
Blue Bird K4

- Blue Bird K3
- Blue Bird K4

=== Donald Campbell ===
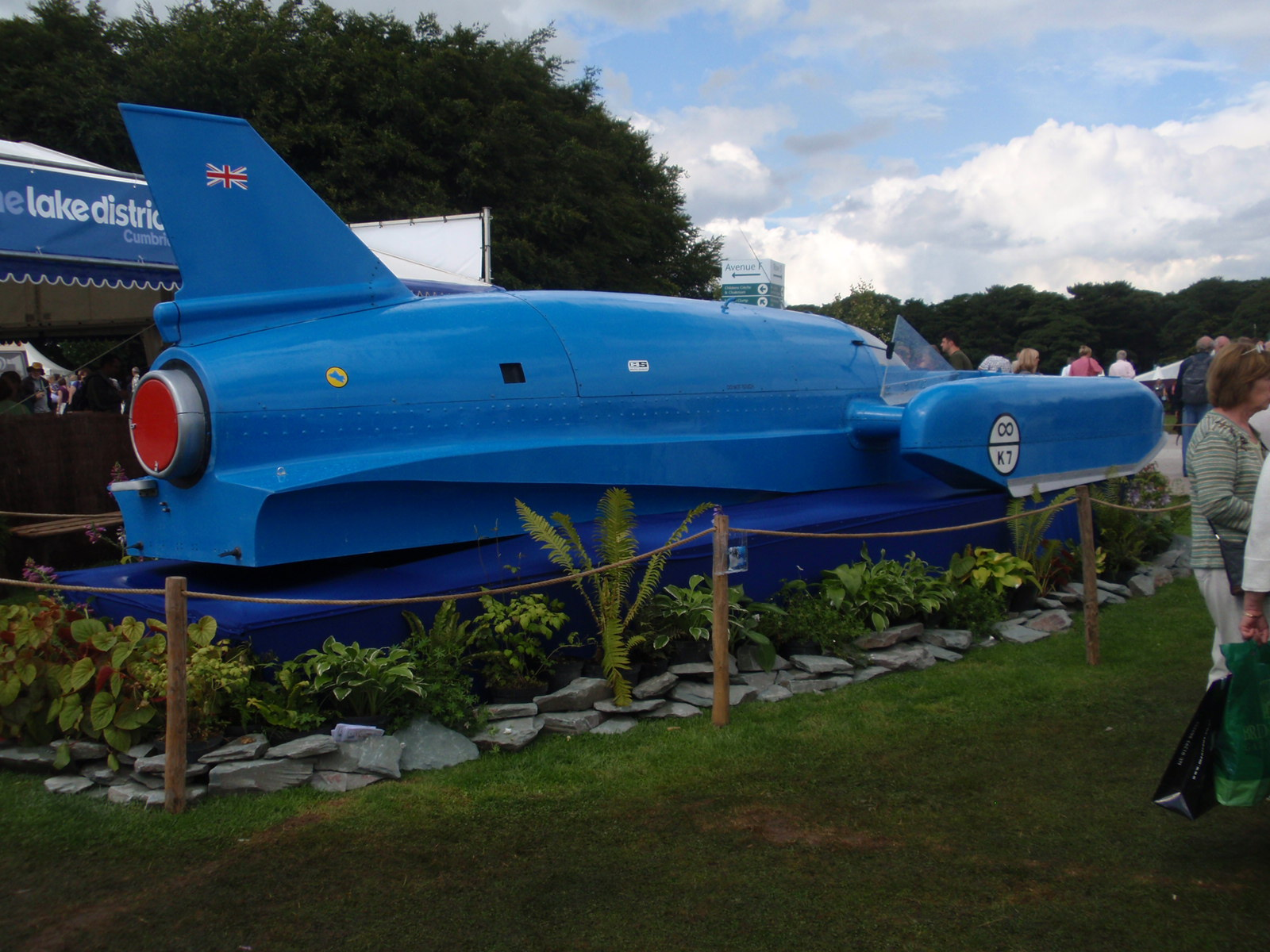
Bluebird K7 replica at the Tatton Park Flower Show, 2009

- Bluebird K4: renamed in 1949, destroyed in 1951
- Bluebird K7: 1955–1967

=== Gina Campbell ===
Gina Campbell, daughter of Donald Campbell, has contested the women's world water speed record.

- Agfa Bluebird

== See also ==
- Bluebird of Chelsea
- Bluebird Garage
- List of vehicle speed records
