= Tatton Park Flower Show =

Annual flower show held by the Royal Horticultural Society

Coordinates: 53.3306°N 2.38356°W

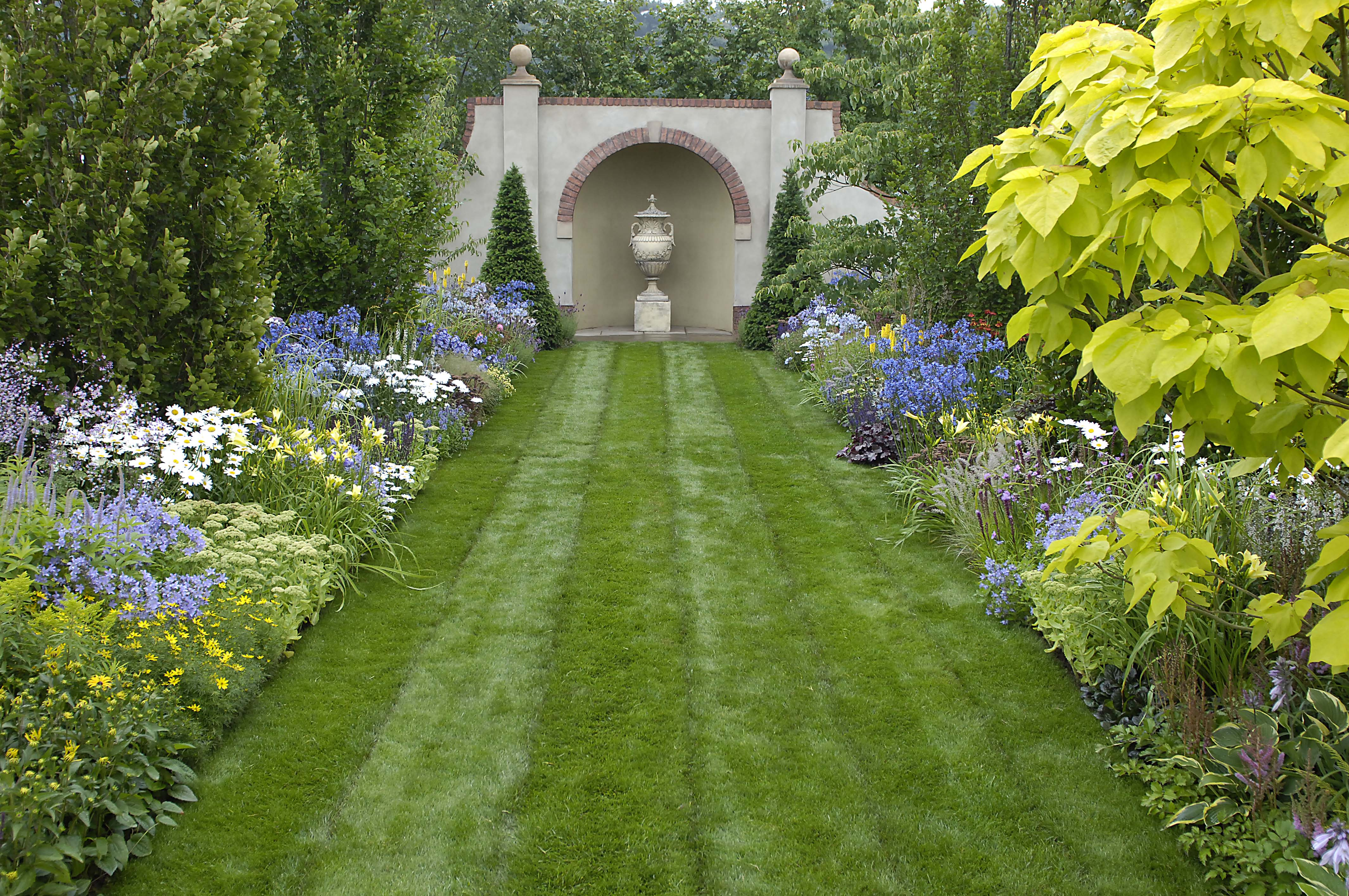
Celebrating Cheshire's Year of Gardens, 2008

RHS Flower Show Tatton Park held at Tatton Park, near Knutsford, Cheshire, first began in 1999 by the Royal Horticultural Society. The show houses the RHS National Flower Bed Competition, Young Designer of the Year Award and a wide range of inspirational show gardens, smaller 'Back to Back' gardens, visionary gardens and a number of marquees displaying prize plants and flora exhibits. Other key features of the show are the floral marquee and plant plaza, the arts and heritage pavilion, and the floral design studio.

== History ==
By the mid-1990s the Society's confidence in its abilities at staging regional shows had improved, and Council was considering the creation of purely RHS shows in the more far-flung regions. By 1996 negotiations were under way with Tatton Park in Cheshire, and with Strathclyde Council in Scotland. The Island, a 19-acre (77,000 m^{2}) site between the River Clyde and Strathclyde Loch, in Strathclyde Country Park, southeast of Glasgow, was chosen as the site for a show. Stephen Bennett was quoted as saying, "We have long known that Scotland has enormous potential for a show of international standing, and response to the concept has been overwhelming." The target was 50,000 visitors in the first year.

Scotland's National Gardening Show was launched in 1997, and billed as the largest flower show in Scotland since the Glasgow Garden Festival of 1988. It was publicised with a special issue of The Garden devoted to Scottish themes, and the first year was seen as a great success, with 260 exhibitors and 47,000 visitors. Over 40 per cent of the exhibitors were Scottish, and most of them had never appeared before at an RHS show. Exhibits included a Robert Fortune garden, sponsored by Christian Aid Scotland, devoted to plants that he had introduced; a mining garden; a small wildlife garden from Scottish Natural Heritage; and an exhibit recreating the centre of Inverness, planted with alpines.

In its second year (1998) exhibitor numbers rose to 300, but attendance fell to 43,000, largely because of adverse weather.

The third year (1999), however, was disastrous: while the mounting costs of an expanding show meant that 50,000 visitors were needed in order for it to break even, the attendance fell to 35,000 – a third of the attendance attracted by the Tatton Park Show in the same year. In August 1999, the Society reluctantly announced that it could not afford to stage the show again. Scottish horticulturists hurriedly formed a consortium to stage a replacement show, and the Royal Caledonian Horticultural Society became involved in its organisation.

In later years the show developed a reputation for showcasing new talent across all forms of gardening design and the arts. In 2009 the show introduced two new show garden categories, The RHS Young Designer of the Year Award and the Visionary Gardens where designers were encouraged to "break the mould".

The 2011 introduced a "Ladies Day" which encouraged women to dress stylishly and socialise at a fashion show and dinner from Fortnum & Mason.

== RHS Show Tatton Park ==
The first Tatton Show had been planned for 1998, but in the event it was decided to concentrate on Scotland first. The late Max de Soissons (who died in his early 50s in June 2012), an experienced organiser of trade exhibitions, who had been hired in 1996 as the RHS manager for the BBC Gardeners' World Live show in Birmingham, was appointed the Tatton Show manager. At the first Tatton Show in 1999, there were 12 show gardens, 16 back-to-back gardens (distinct from the small gardens at Birmingham or the courtyard gardens at Chelsea), 77 nurseries in the main marquee, ten rose growers in the Royal National Rose Show (sponsored by Manchester Airport), 200 sundries stands, some 20 plant societies in a specialist societies marquee, and about 30 national collections represented in a heritage marquee, and a crafts pavilion sponsored by Country Living magazine, and a separate furniture pavilion. 70,000 visitors were expected, and 102,000 arrived. Tatton, the RHS staff agreed, had the friendliest atmosphere of any of the Society's shows.

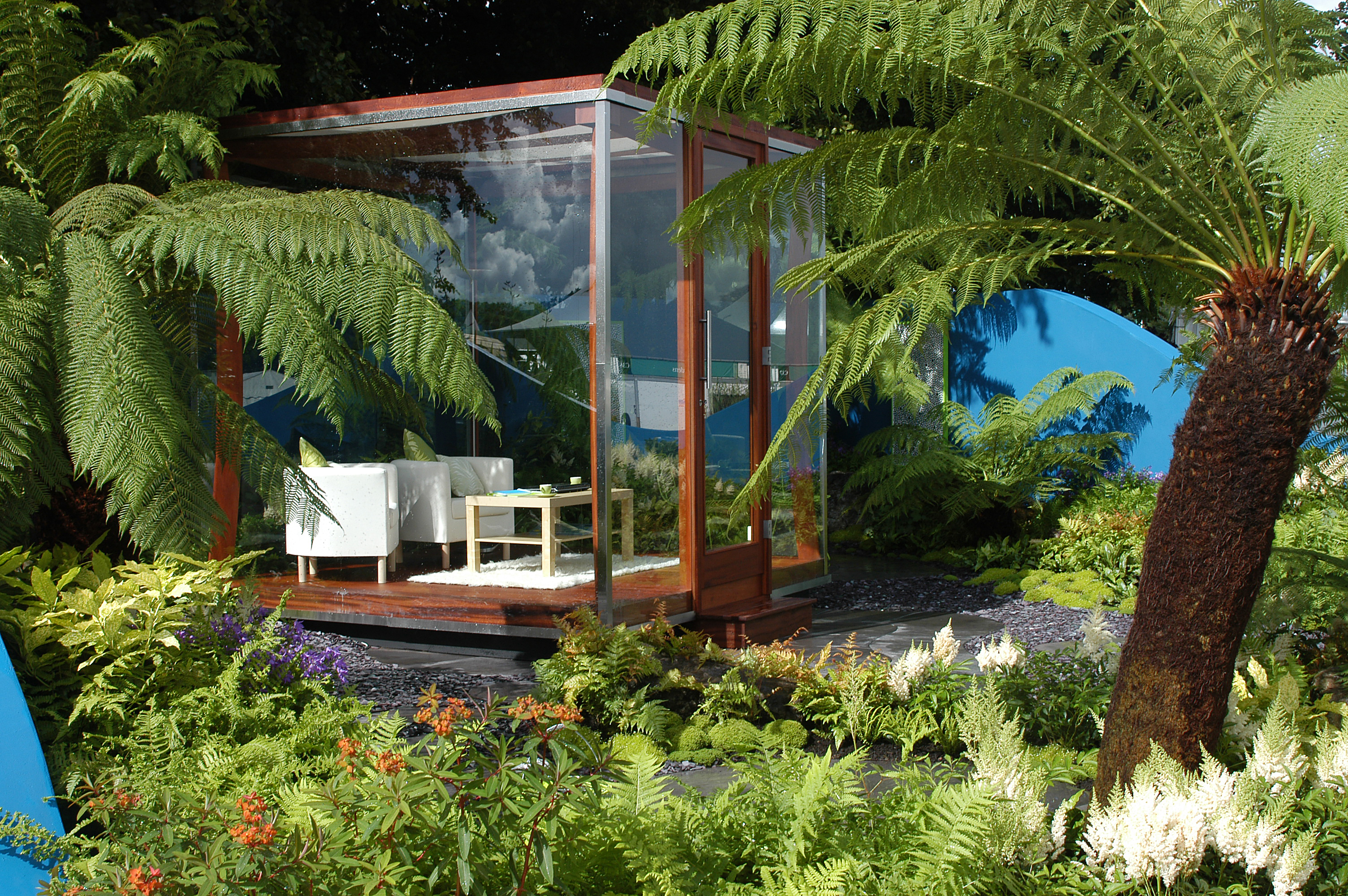
The Forest Fusion Garden, 2007

Robert Sweet, the former Torbay Parks Officer, now Head of Shows Development, suggested a competition among parks departments for the best bedding scheme. The plots, each a standard 6×4 ft bed so that the local authorities competed on equal terms despite any differences in their size and wealth, were laid out on either side of a principal avenue: there were six competitors in the first year, 12 in the second, rising to 24 in 2003, by which time the competition was having a decided effect on the media coverage of municipal bedding.

The volume of traffic attracted by this show causes temporary road closures and one-way working in the country lanes between Tatton Park and the A556 road, and some congestion on the A556.

== Gallery ==
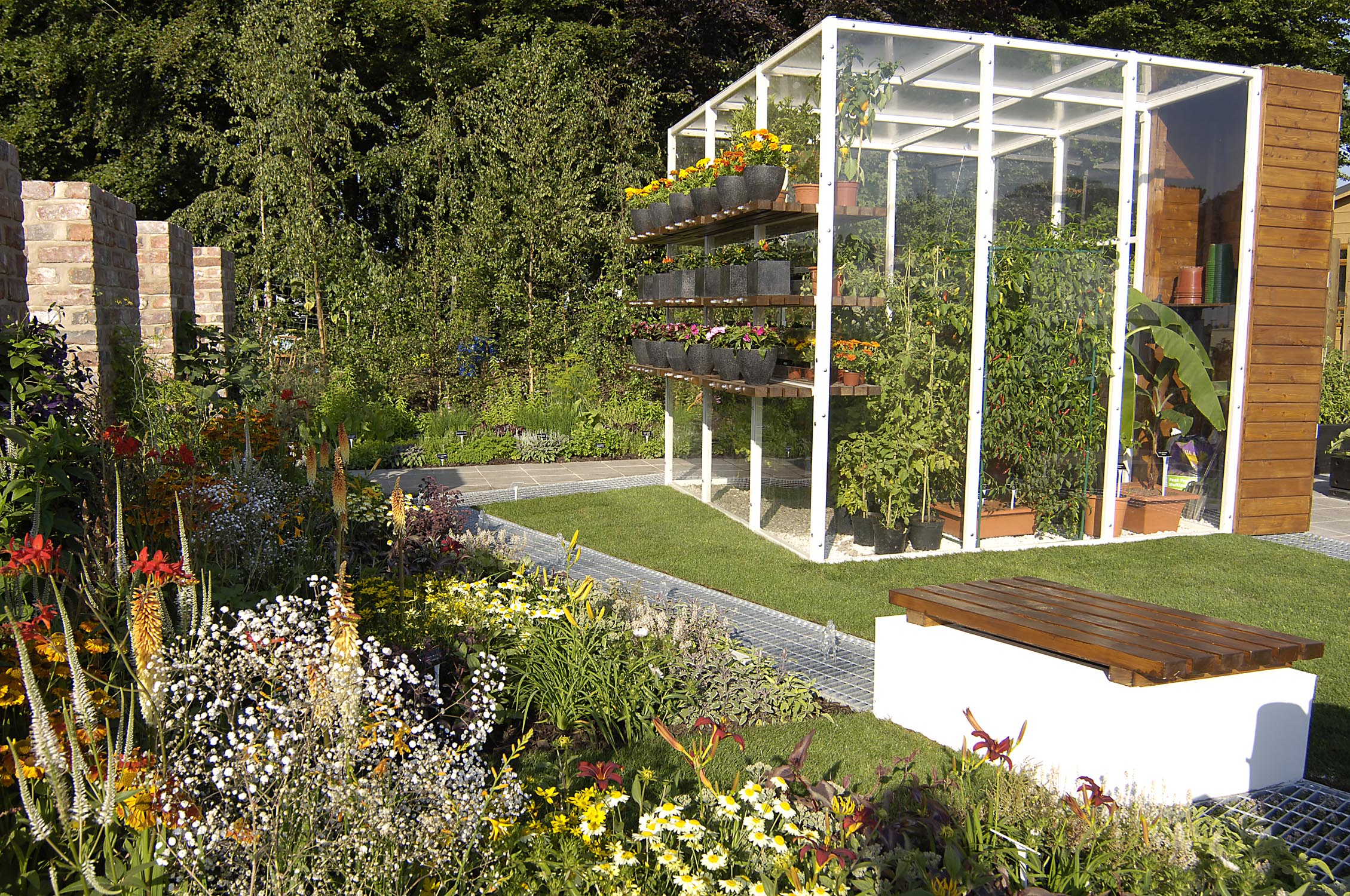
England's North West a Healthy Future Garden, 2006

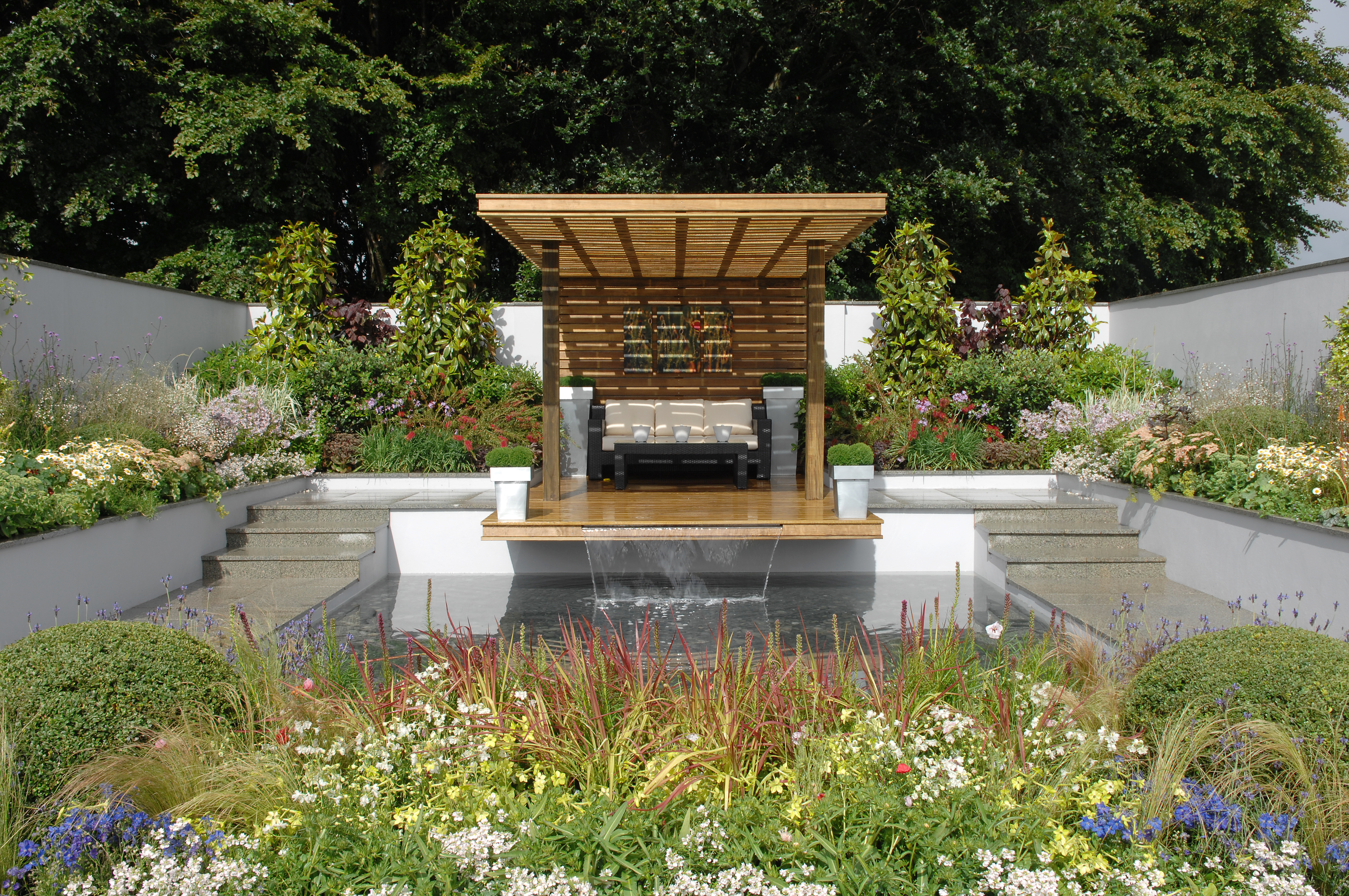
The Cater Allen Private Bank Garden, 2007

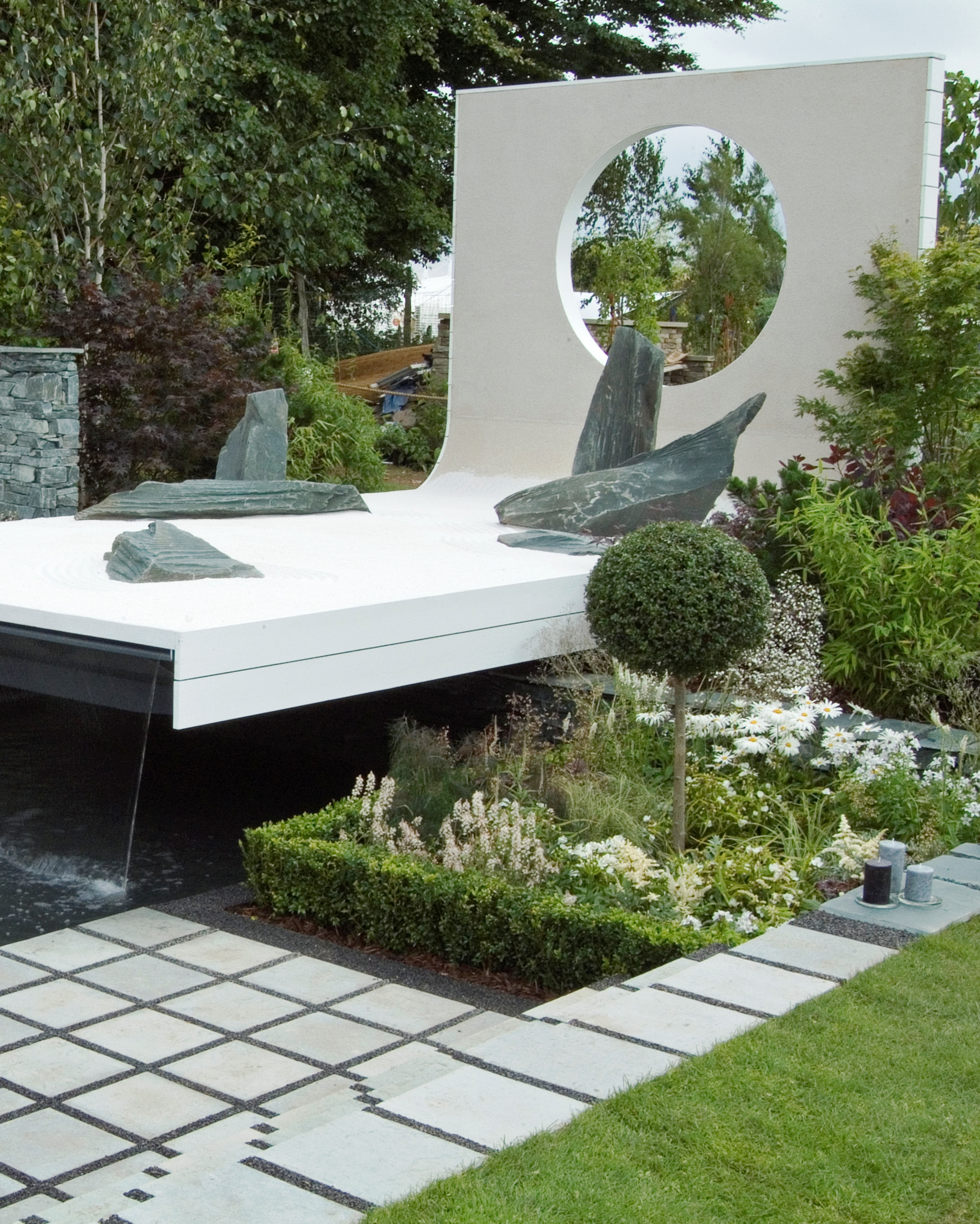
The East Meets West Garden, 2008

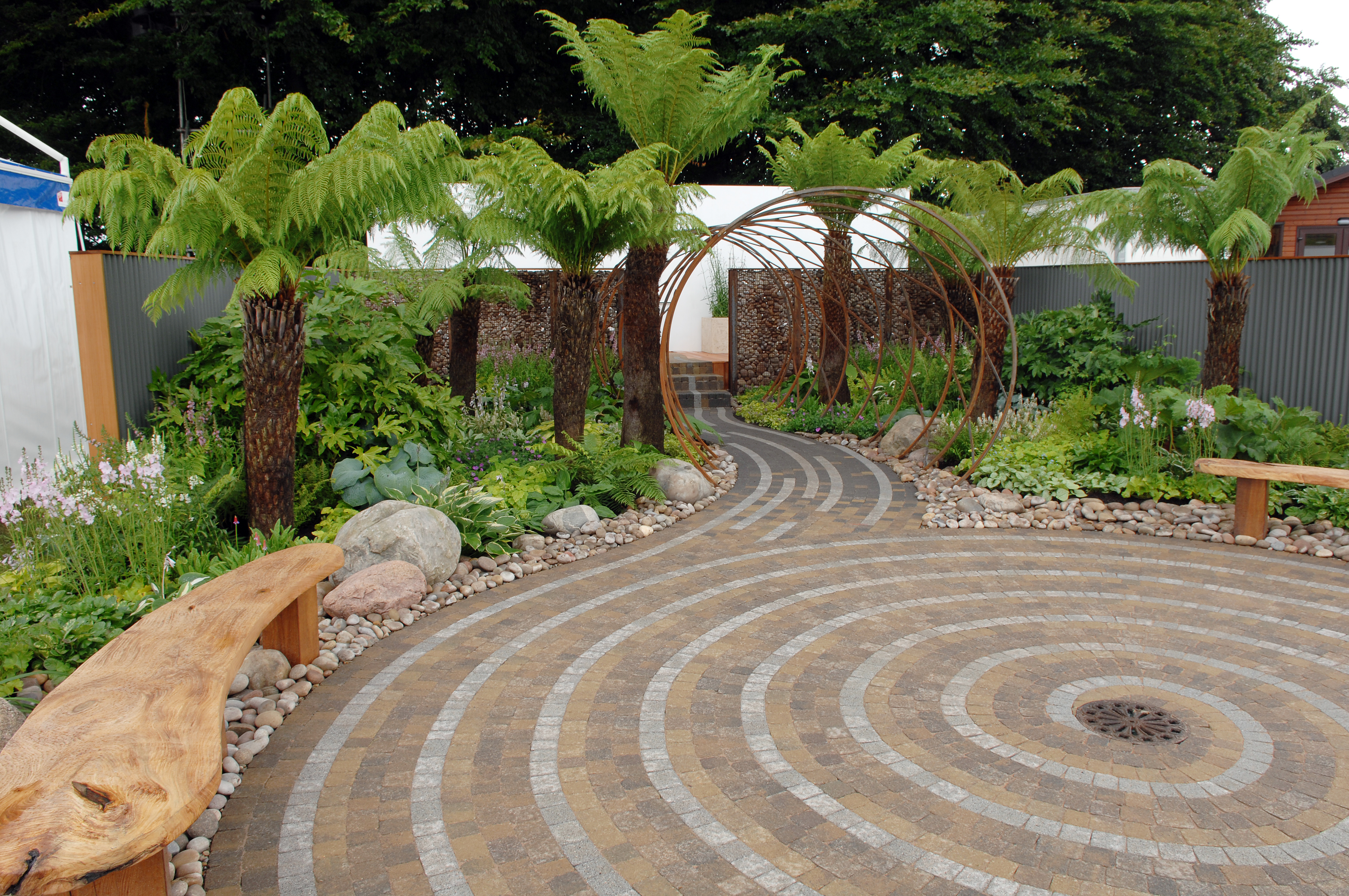
The Into the Light Garden, 2007

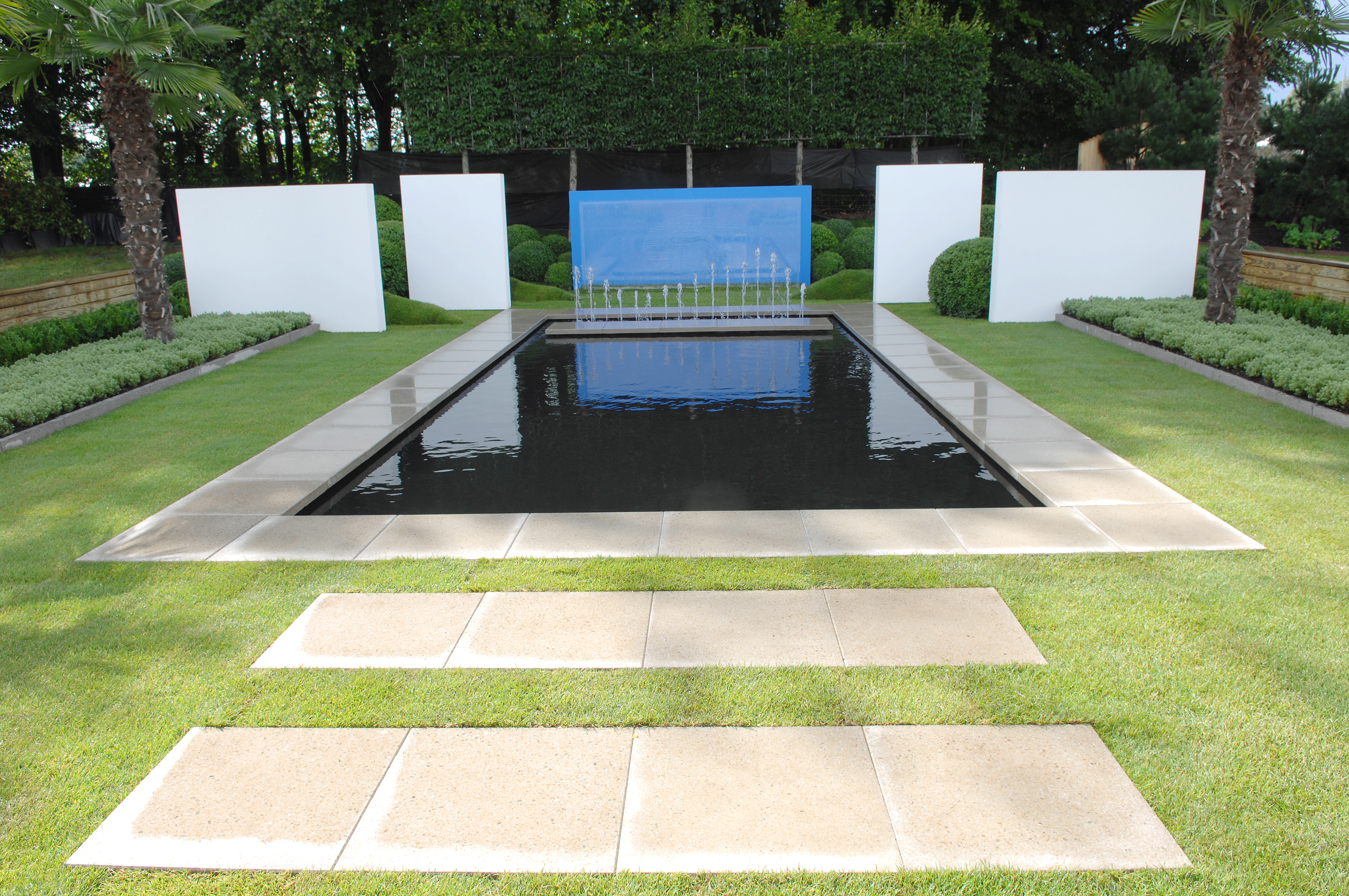
The Brewin Dolphin Garden, 2007

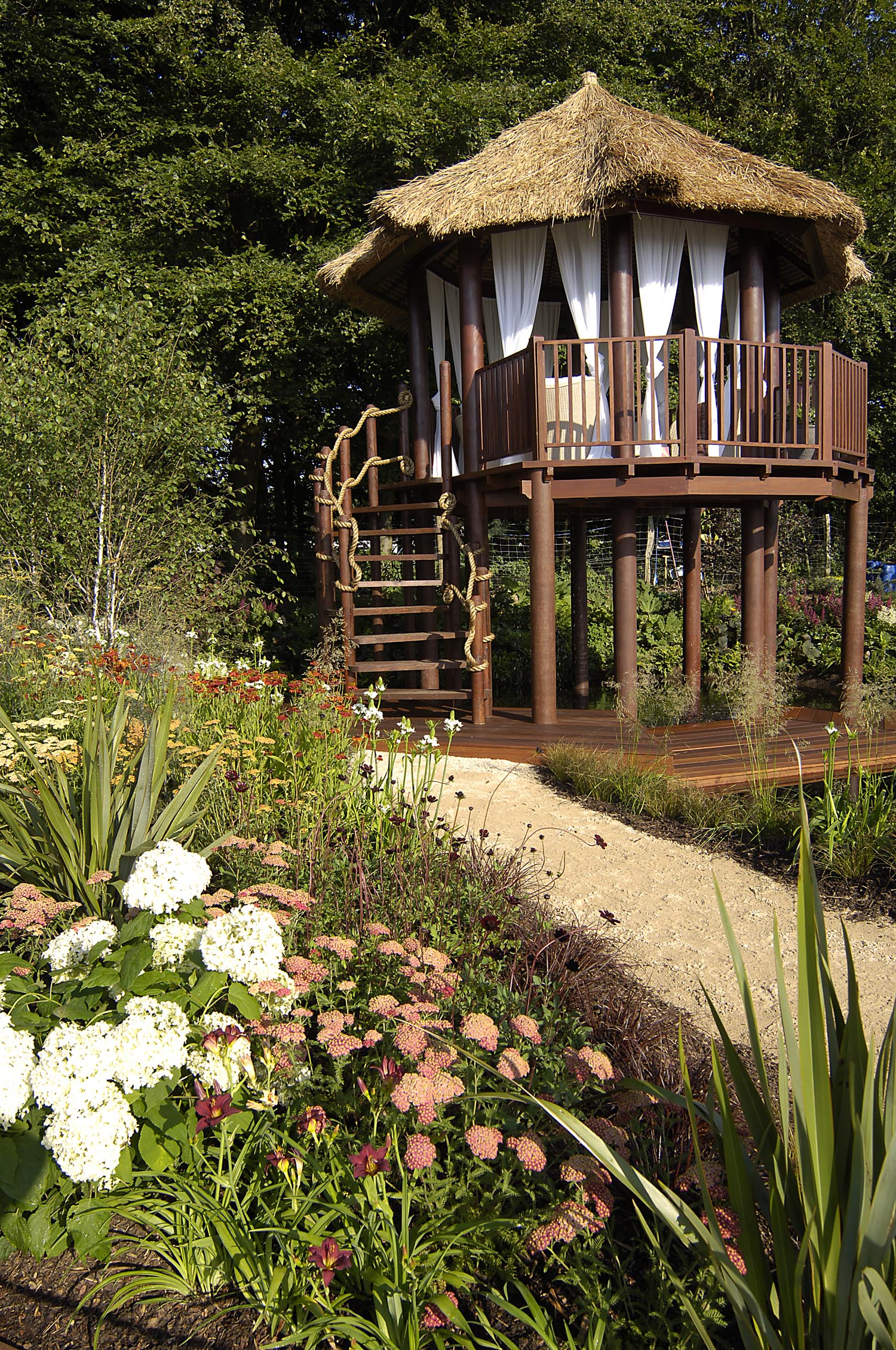
The Out of Africa Garden, 2006

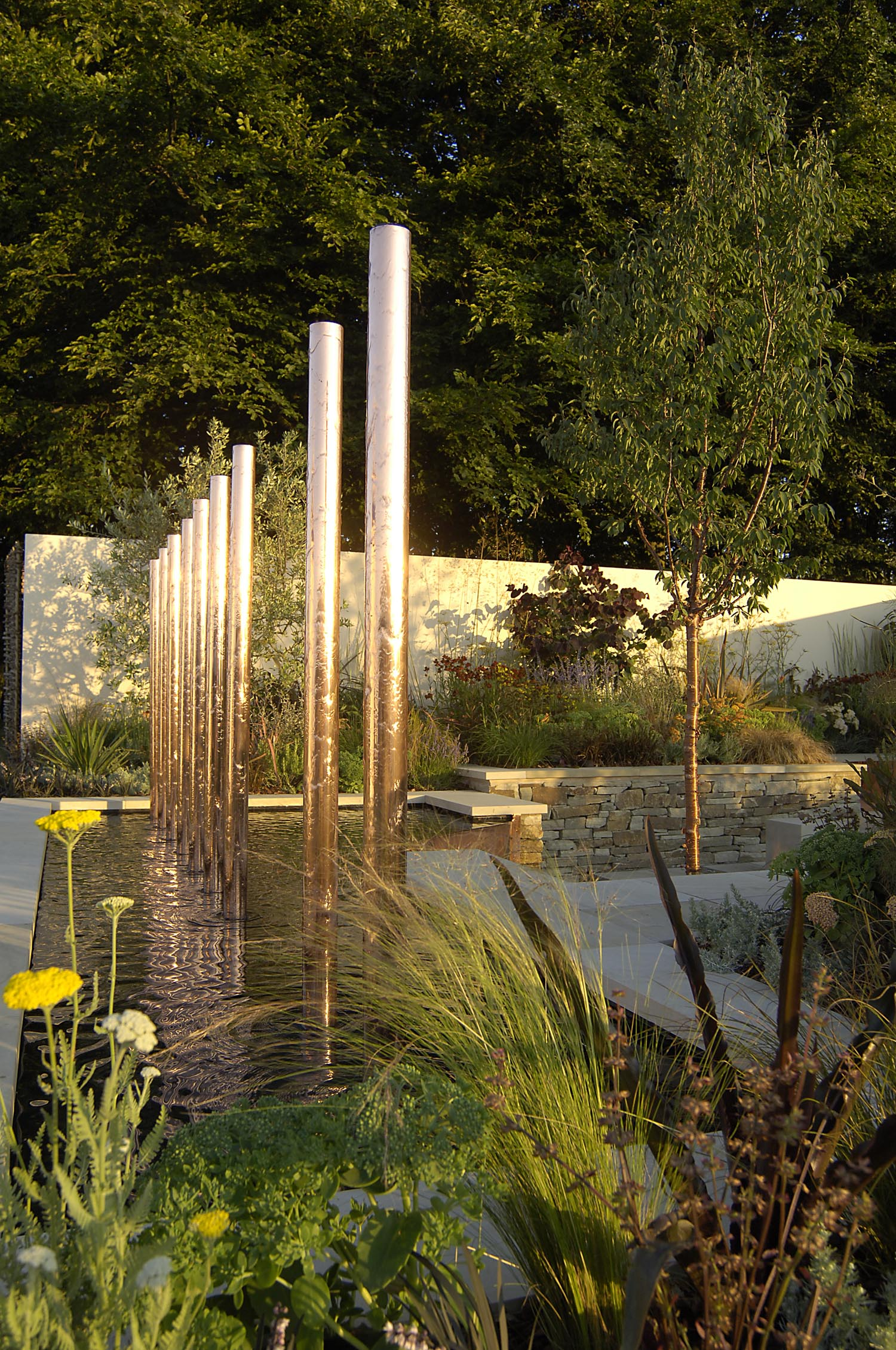
The Four Elements Garden: A garden for the senses, 2006

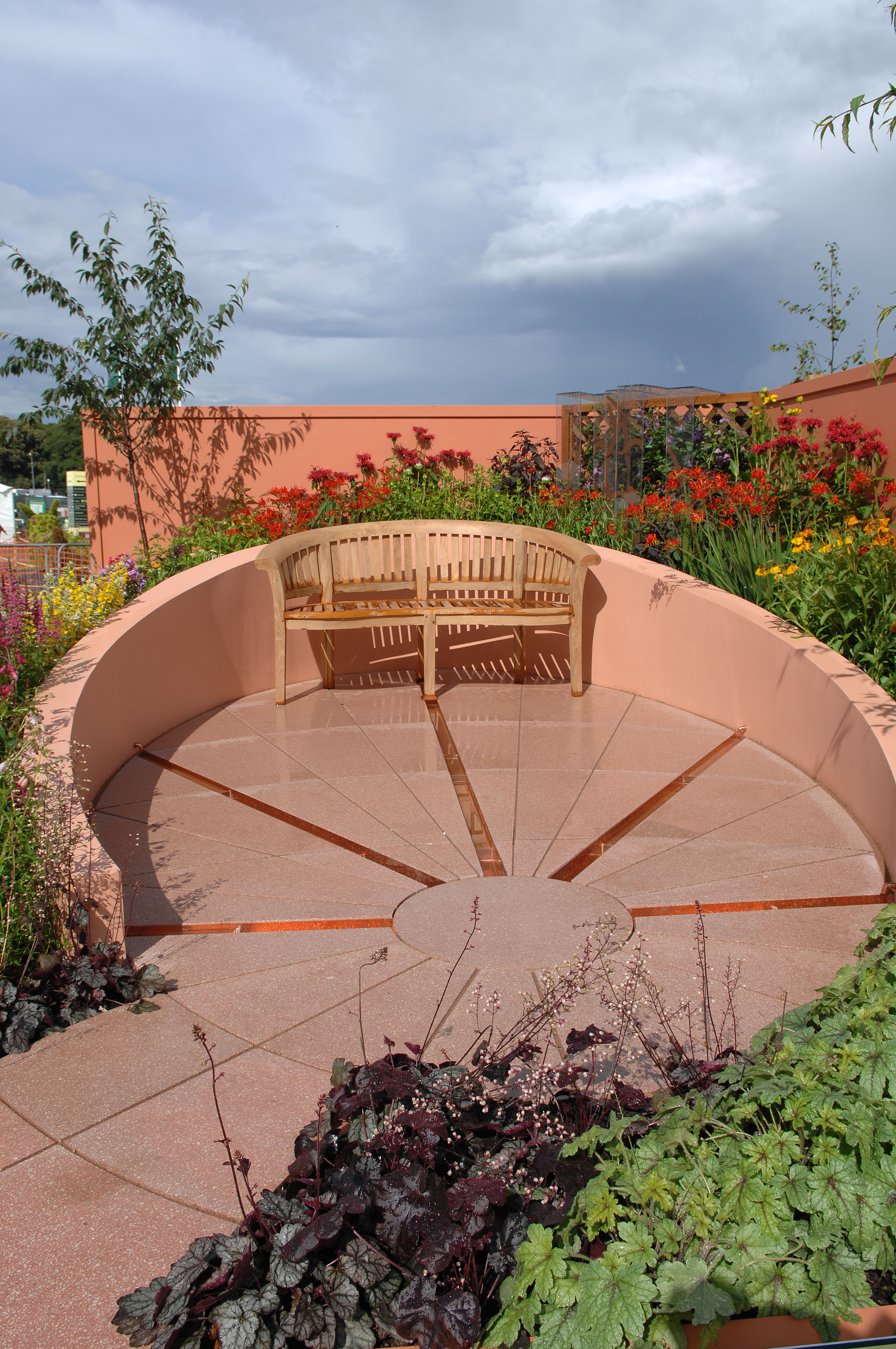
The Life and Soul Garden, 2007

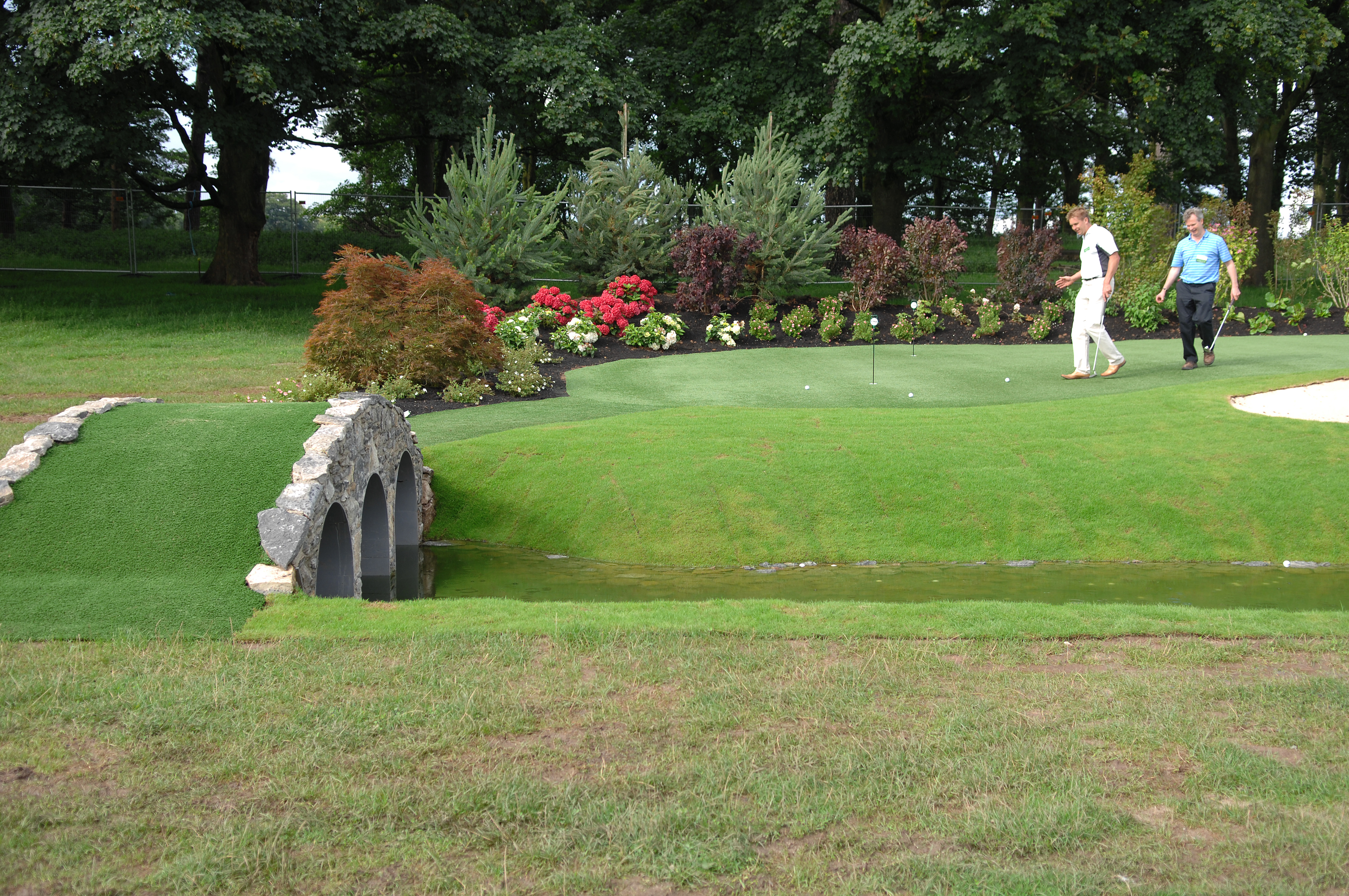
The Green Approach's Amen Corner Garden, 2007

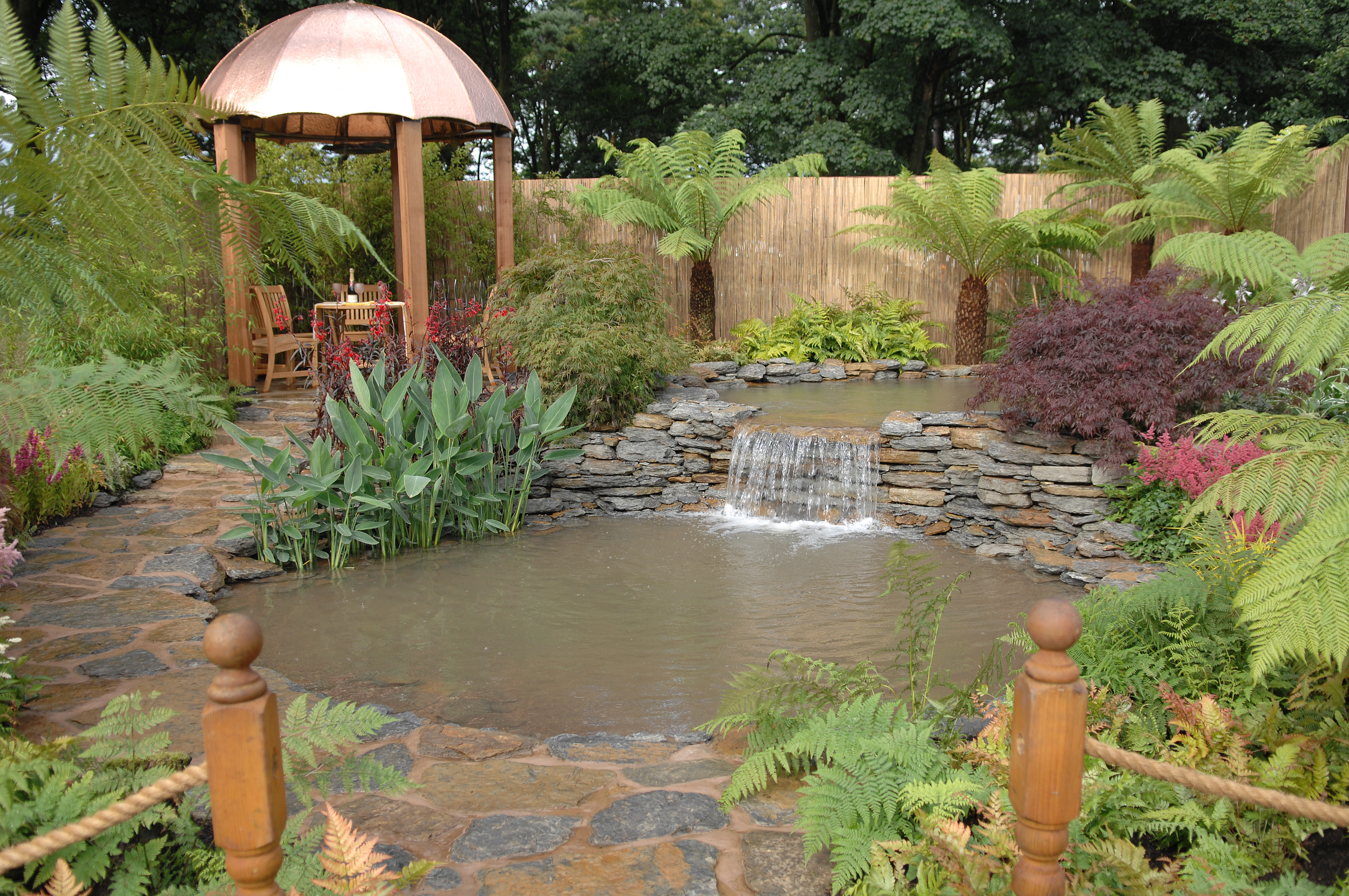
The Water Garden, 2007

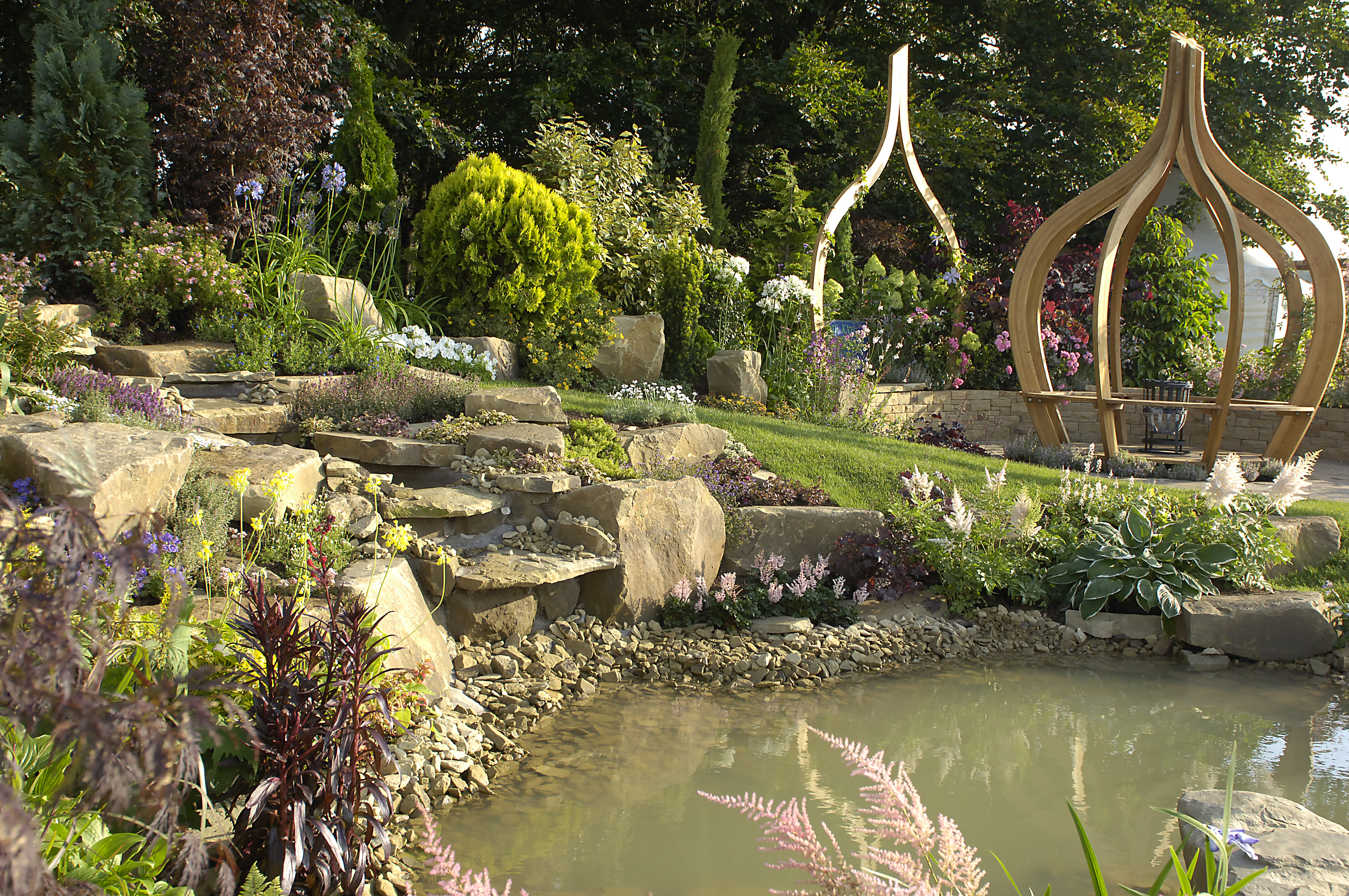
The Natural Distinction Garden, 2008

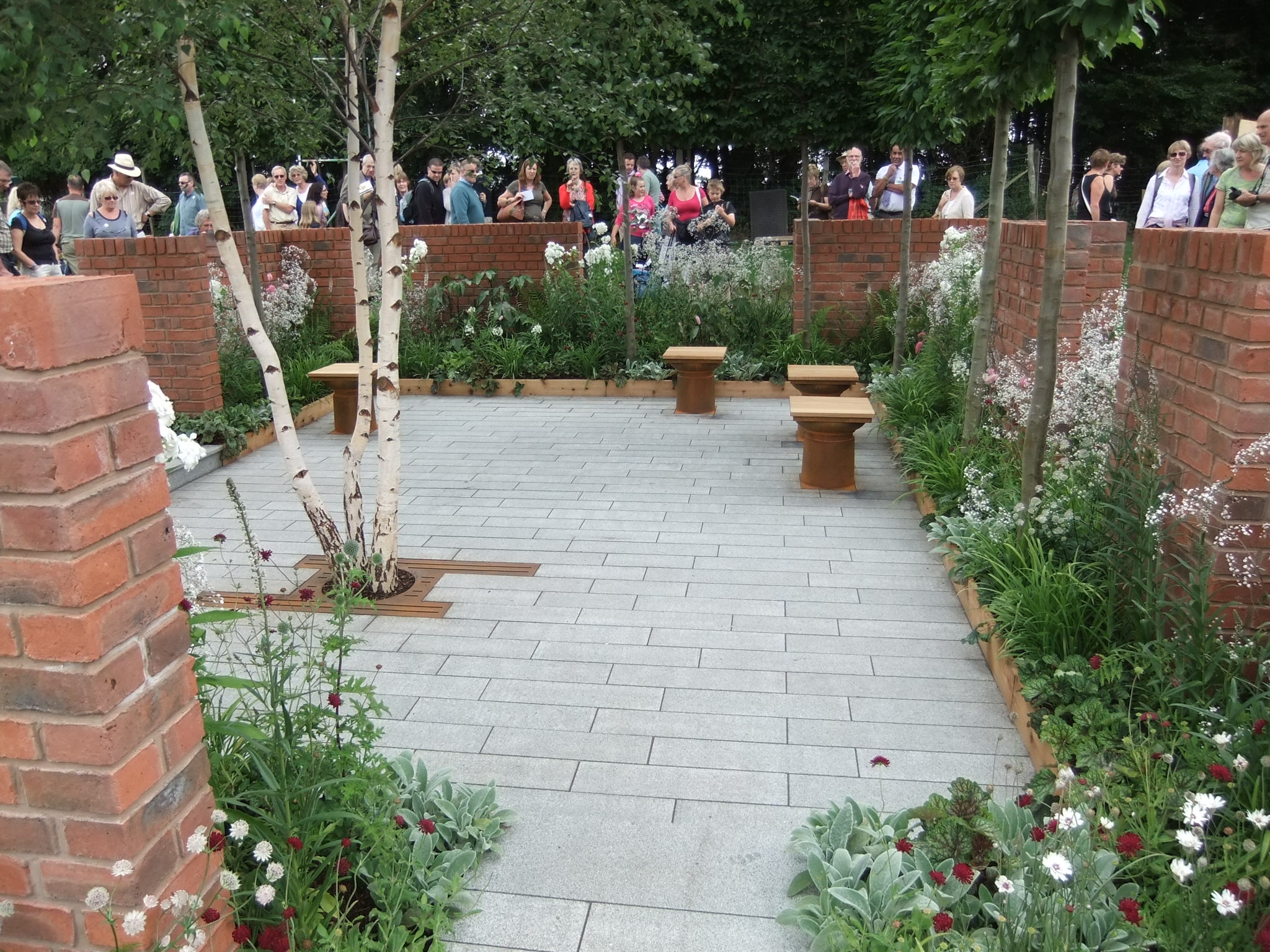
Albert Dock Garden, top prize entry in 2010
