= Alan Titchmarsh =

British gardener, broadcaster, and writer (born 1949)

Alan Titchmarsh CBE DL VMH HonFSE
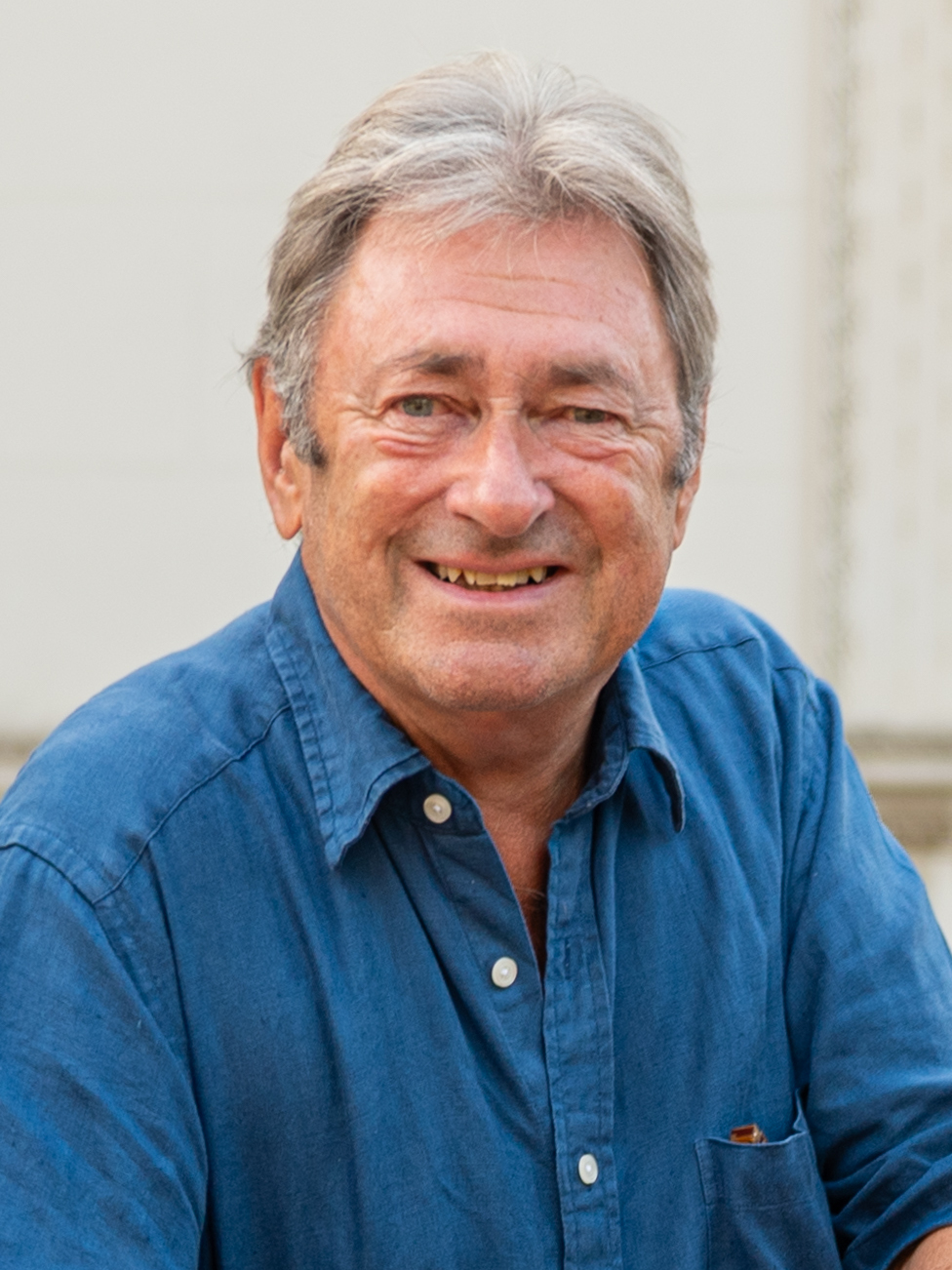
- Titchmarsh in 2023
- Born: Alan Fred Titchmarsh; 2 May 1949 (age 77); Ilkley, West Riding of Yorkshire, England
- Education: Hertfordshire College of Agriculture and Horticulture; Royal Botanic Gardens, Kew
- Occupations: Broadcaster; gardener; novelist; poet
- Years active: 1974–present
- Television: Gardeners' World (1996–2002); Ground Force (1997–2002); Alan Titchmarsh Show (2007–2014); Popstar to Operastar (2010); Love Your Garden (2011–2023)
- Spouse: Alison Titchmarsh (m. 1975)
- Children: 2
- Website: https://www.gardeningwithalantitchmarsh.com/

Alan Fred Titchmarsh (born 2 May 1949) is an English gardener, author and broadcaster. After working as a professional gardener and a horticultural journalist, he became a radio and television presenter and a novelist.

== Early career ==
Alan Fred Titchmarsh was born on 2 May 1949 in Ilkley, West Riding of Yorkshire, England. He is the son of Bessie (née Hardisty), a textile mill worker, and Alan Titchmarsh senior, a plumber. In 1964, after leaving school at 15, with one O-level in Art, Titchmarsh went to work as an apprentice gardener with Ilkley Council, attending day release classes at Shipley Art and Technology Institute in Shipley in the West Riding of Yorkshire studying for a City and Guilds qualification in horticulture.

In 1968, Titchmarsh went on to study at Hertfordshire College of Agriculture and Horticulture for the National Certificate in Horticulture, before finally moving to the Royal Botanic Gardens, Kew in 1969 to study for a Diploma in Horticulture. After graduating he stayed on at Kew for two years, employed as gardens supervisor in charge of staff training. He left to pursue a career in gardening journalism in 1974. Interested in English literature and writing, he applied for a post with the Hamlyn publishing group, as assistant editor of gardening books. He then started to write his own gardening books, with the first, Starting With Houseplants, being published in 1976.

== Television and radio ==
In 1977, Titchmarsh began his career in broadcasting as a gardening expert on BBC Radio 4 You and Yours and The Today Programme. Titchmarsh's first television appearances were on the BBC television shows Nationwide and Breakfast Time as a horticulture expert. This led to his presenting of the Chelsea Flower Show for BBC television in 1983. Titchmarsh hosted this every year until 2013.

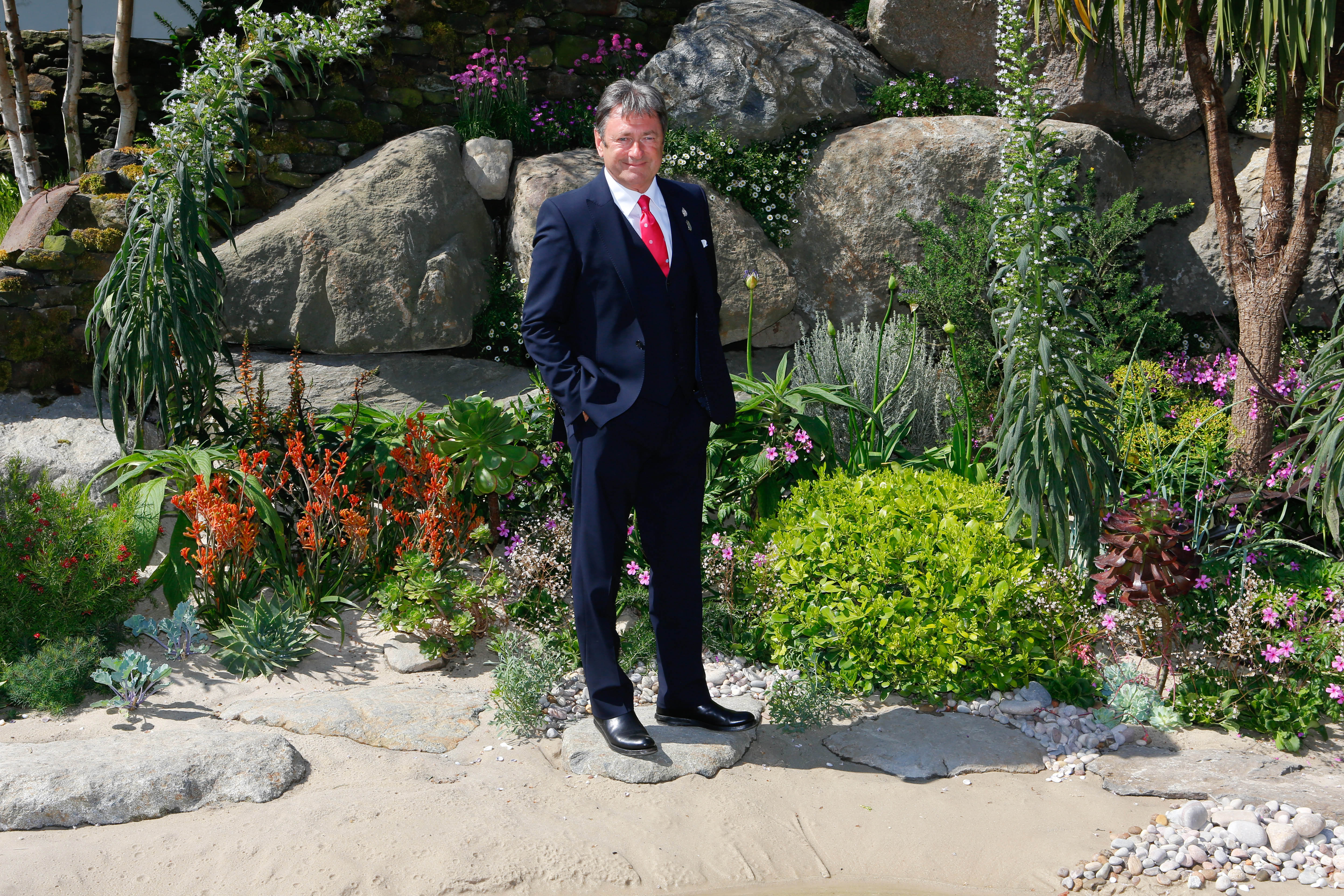
Titchmarsh at the Chelsea Flower Show 2014

In 1986, Titchmarsh hosted Open Air and from 1987, the BBC television talk shows Daytime Live and Pebble Mill, which he did until 1996. In 1991, he presented a six part series, Titchmarsh's Travels, in which he followed in the footsteps of the pilgrims, travelling around Britain and Ireland.

In 1996, Titchmarsh took over as host of Gardeners' World, the show being filmed in his own garden. In 1997, he hosted the BBC One television series Ground Force, in which he and fellow presenters Charlie Dimmock and Tommy Walsh would perform a makeover on a garden, he left in 2002. After Gardeners' World, Titchmarsh presented two series of How to Be a Gardener.

Away from gardening, Titchmarsh had spells presenting Songs of Praise as well as two BBC nature documentary series, British Isles – A Natural History and The Nature of Britain.

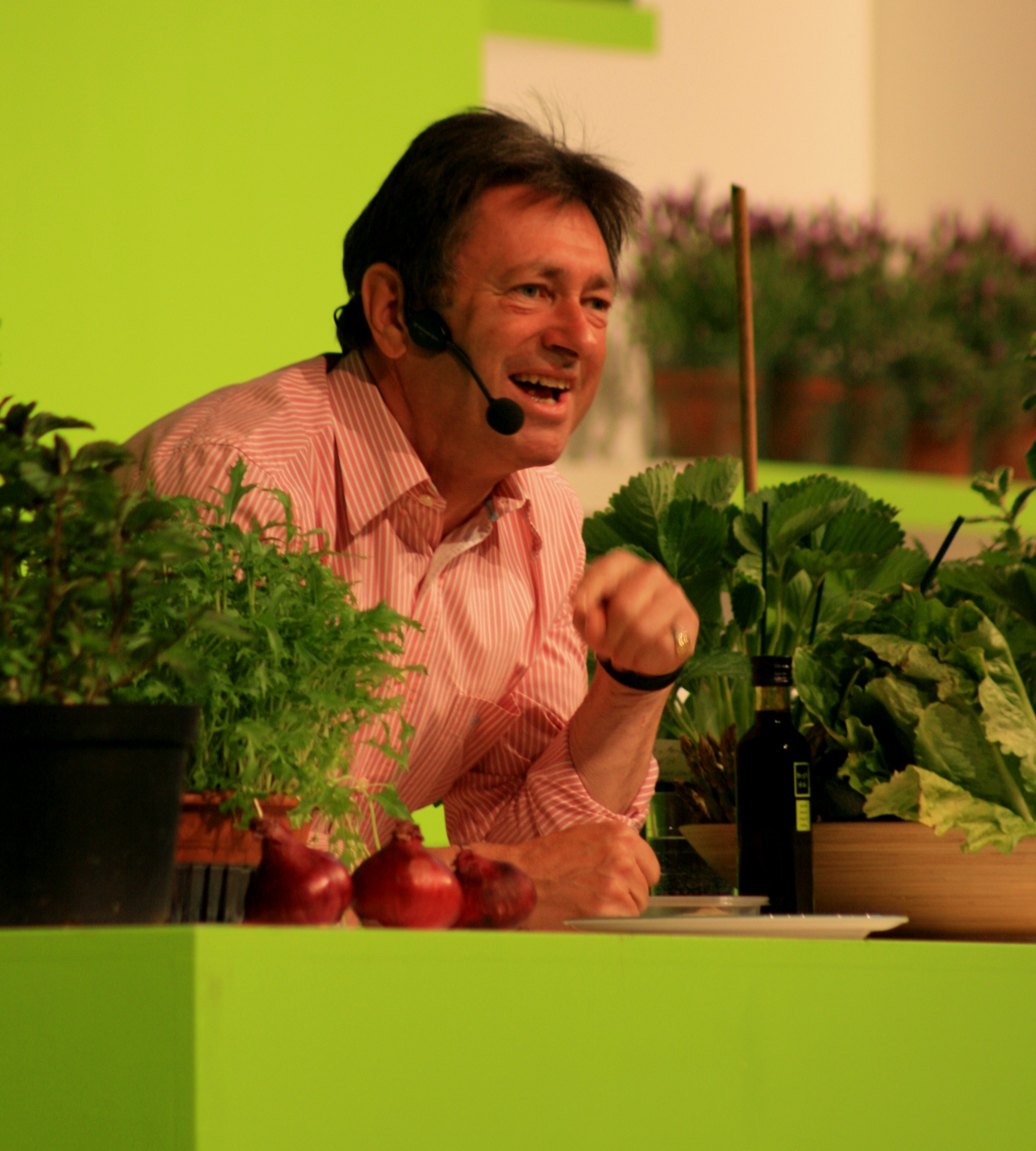
Titchmarsh at the 2008 Gardeners' World Live Exhibition in the NEC

Titchmarsh voiced the title character in Gordon the Garden Gnome, a cartoon series for the CBeebies channel.

He hosted the 20th Century Roadshow, a 2005 spin-off series from Antiques Roadshow; performed in the 2006 Children's Party at the Palace for the Queen's 80th birthday; and guest hosted an episode of The Paul O'Grady Show. In 2007, Titchmarsh hosted The Great British Village Show. He also presented the afternoon ITV chat show The Alan Titchmarsh Show (2007–2014) and in 2006 was given a permanent slot on BBC Radio 2 on Sunday evenings with the show Melodies for You.

In 2010, Titchmarsh presented the first series of Popstar to Operastar with Myleene Klass. From 2011 to 2023, he presented the gardening show Love Your Garden. In June 2012, he presented Elizabeth: Queen, Wife, Mother on ITV. In August 2011, Titchmarsh left Radio 2. Since January 2012, he has hosted a Saturday morning and now Saturday afternoon show on Classic FM.

In 2013, Titchmarsh was a reporter on the BBC Two programme The Great British Winter. In the same year, he responded to complaints that older women were discriminated against on television by stating he would like to hear less "whingeing". "They don't complain in their early days when they are disporting themselves on sports cars," he stated in an interview with The Observer. This drew criticism from media figures who had been protesting against the difficulties faced by older women in the media, including from Miriam O'Reilly, winner of an age discrimination case against the BBC. In 2014, he presented The Queen's Garden, a two-part series for ITV that was filmed over one year. In 2015, Titchmarsh presented Britain's Best Back Gardens. From 2016 to 2017, he presented the game show Masterpiece for ITV. In 2017, the Channel Five programme Secrets of the National Trust started airing with Alan Titchmarsh as the main presenter.

In March 2024, it was widely reported in the UK press that Titchmarsh's trousers were censored on Korean Central Television (North Korea television). Titchmarsh was wearing jeans in Alan Titchmarsh's Garden Secrets, and jeans are banned in North Korea as they are considered a sign of western imperialism. Speaking to the BBC, Titchmarsh said the news had given him "a bit of street cred".

== Writing ==
Titchmarsh has written for newspapers and magazines for more than fifty years and has written more than seventy books, including books on the countryside and the royal family. His first book was published in 1979; twenty years later, he branched out into fiction. His first novel was Mr MacGregor in 1998. He has written a dozen novels. Trowel & Error (2002) was an autobiographical work, followed by Nobbut a Lad: A Yorkshire Childhood (2006), and then Knave of Spades (2009) and When I Was A Nipper (2010).

Titchmarsh has also published a series of gardening guides, the How to Garden series (2009 onwards).

== Personal life ==
Titchmarsh married Alison in 1975 and they have two children. In 2002 he and his wife moved into a grade II listed Georgian Hampshire farmhouse, with a garden of 4 acres (1.6 ha). He also has a coastal home, near Cowes on the Isle of Wight, where he spends about a third of the year.

Titchmarsh is a bell ringer. In 2011, he rang a quarter peal in Holybourne, Hampshire, to celebrate the wedding of Prince William and Catherine Middleton. Also in 2011, he participated in an Elm Tree Planting Ceremony to promote urban greening in London. He returned to the Marylebone and Fitzrovia area to plant a project's 1000th new tree in 2022.

=== Political views ===
Titchmarsh is a monarchist. He was reported to have commented favourably on the UK Independence Party's Nigel Farage in 2013 and in 2014, saying he had "some sympathy with the clarion wake-up call they’re trying to give the country". During a 2017 interview in support of a refugee charity, he clarified: "I said I could understand why he captured the public's imagination. He articulated a lot of people's thoughts. But I didn't vote for Brexit. I think we should all stick together."

In 2014, Titchmarsh was one of 200 public figures who were signatories to a letter to The Guardian, expressing their hope that Scotland would vote to remain part of the United Kingdom in September's referendum on that issue.

== Honours and awards ==
Titchmarsh was appointed a Member of the Order of the British Empire (MBE) in the 2000 New Year Honours for services to horticulture and broadcasting, and was promoted to Commander of the Order of the British Empire (CBE) in the 2025 New Year Honours for services to horticulture and to charity He was made a Deputy Lieutenant (DL) of the County of Hampshire in 2001. In 2008, Titchmarsh served as High Sheriff of the Isle of Wight.

In 1999, Titchmarsh was awarded an honorary Doctor of Science (Hon DSc) degree by the University of Bradford. He was made Patron of Writtle College, a university college in Essex, in 2001 and had a building named after him at the college in 2011 (the "Titchmarsh Centre for Animal Studies"). In 2004, he was awarded the Royal Horticultural Society's Victoria Medal of Honour, the highest award the RHS can bestow. In 2007 he was awarded an honorary degree by the University of Winchester, and in 2015 was designated as the Chancellor of the university, a post he held until 2022. He was honoured by the City of Westminster at a tree planting and plaque ceremony in 2011 and 2022. Among numerous other awards, he received a Lifetime Achievement Award by the Garden Media Guild in 2004 and made an Honorary Fellow of the Society for the Environment in 2014.

== Bibliography ==
=== Non-fiction ===
- Gardening Under Cover, 1979 (ISBN 0-600-34078-3)
- Guide to Greenhouse Gardening, 1980 (ISBN 0-600-34131-3)
- Climbers and Wall Plants, 1980 (ISBN 0-7063-5882-1)
- Hamlyn Guide to House Plants, 1982 (ISBN 0-600-30530-9)
- The Allotment Gardener's Handbook, 1982 (ISBN 0-7278-2026-5)
- How to be a Supergardener, 1983 (ISBN 0-7063-6174-1)
- Creating Garden Pools, 1984 (ISBN 0-600-30707-7)
- The Gardener's Year, 2005 (ISBN 0-563-52167-8)
- Fill My Stocking, 2005 (ISBN 0-563-48862-X)
- The Complete How to Be a Gardener, 2005 (ISBN 0-563-52262-3)
- British Isles a Natural History, 2005 (ISBN 0-563-52162-7)
- England, Our England, 2007 (ISBN 978-0-340-95303-7)
- The Nature of Britain, 2007 (ISBN 0-563-49398-4)
- The Kitchen Gardener – Grow Your Own Fruit & Veg, 2008 (ISBN 978-1-84607-201-7)
- How to Garden: Gardening in the Shade, 2009 (ISBN 978-1-84607-395-3)
- How to Garden: Vegetables and Herbs, 2009 (ISBN 978-1-84607-396-0)
- How to Garden: Container Gardening, 2009 (ISBN 978-1-84607-399-1)
- How to Garden: Garden Design, 2009 (ISBN 978-1-84607-397-7)
- How to Garden: Lawns, Paths and Patios, 2009 (ISBN 978-1-84607-398-4)
- How to Garden: Pruning and Training, 2009 (ISBN 978-1-84607-400-4)
- How to Garden: Growing Fruit, 2010 (ISBN 978-1-84607-401-1)
- How to Garden: Flowering Shrubs, 2010 (ISBN 978-1-84607-402-8)
- How to Garden: Climbers and Wall Shrubs, 2010 (ISBN 978-1-84607-403-5)
- How to Garden: Greenhouse Gardening, 2010 (ISBN 978-1-84607-404-2)
- How to Garden: Perennial Garden Plants, 2010 (ISBN 978-1-84607-911-5)
- How to Garden: Wildlife Gardening, 2011 (ISBN 978-1-84607-409-7)
- How to Garden: Growing Bulbs, 2011 (ISBN 978-1-84607-407-3)
- How to Garden: Pests and Problems, 2011 (ISBN 978-1-84607-406-6)
- How to Garden: Growing Roses, 2011 (ISBN 978-1-84607-408-0)
- How to Garden: Small Gardens, 2011 (ISBN 978-1-84607-405-9)
- How to Garden: Small Trees, 2012 (ISBN 978-1-84990-220-5)
- How to Garden: Weekend Gardening, 2012 (ISBN 978-1-84990-218-2)
- My Secret Garden, 2012, BBC Books (ISBN 978-1-44814-134-0)
- How to Garden: Instant Colour, 2012 (ISBN 978-1-84990-219-9)
- How to Garden: Allotment Gardening, 2012 (ISBN 978-1-84990-221-2)
- How to Garden: Grow Your Own Plants, 2013 (ISBN 978-1-84990-222-9)
- How to Garden: Water Gardening, 2013 (ISBN 978-1-84990-223-6)
- How to Garden: Flowers and Foliage for Cutting, 2013 (ISBN 978-1-84990-224-3)
- Tales From Titchmarsh, 2011 (ISBN 978-1-44472-864-4)
- Elizabeth: Her Life, Our Times, Ebury Press 2012 (ISBN 978-1-84607-394-6)
- The Queen's Houses, BBC Books 2014 (ISBN 1849902178)
- Lost Skills and Crafts Handbook: A Guide to the Old Ways of Country Life Hardcover, BBC Books 2021 (ISBN 178594701X)
- Chatsworth: The Gardens and the People Who Made Them, Ebury Publishing 2023 (ISBN 978-1-84607-394-6)

=== Memoirs ===
- Trowel and Error, Hodder & Stoughton 2002 (ISBN 0-340-76542-9)
- Nobbut A Lad : A Yorkshire Childhood, Hodder & Stoughton 2006 (ISBN 0-340-83117-0)
- Knave of Spades, Hodder & Stoughton 2009 (ISBN 978-0-340-95306-8)
- Collected memoirs, Hodder & Stoughton 2016 (ISBN 978-1-473-63324-7)

=== Fiction ===
- Mr MacGregor, Simon & Schuster 1998 (ISBN 0-7434-7847-9)
- The Last Lighthouse Keeper, Simon & Schuster 1999 (ISBN 0-7434-7845-2)
- Animal Instincts, Simon & Schuster 2000 (ISBN 0-7434-7848-7)
- Only Dad, Simon & Schuster 2001 (ISBN 0-7434-7846-0)
- Rosie, Simon & Schuster (ISBN 0-7434-3010-7)
- Love and Dr. Devon, Simon & Schuster (ISBN 0-7432-0771-8)
- Folly, Hodder & Stoughton 2008 (ISBN 0-340-93685-1)
- The Haunting, Hodder & Stoughton 2011 (ISBN 0-3409-3689-4)
- Bring Me Home, Hodder & Stoughton 2014 (ISBN 978-0-340-93693-1)
- Mr Gandy's Grand Tour, Hodder & Stoughton 2016 (ISBN 978-0-340-95307-5)
- The Scarlet Nightingale, Hodder Paperbacks 2019 (ISBN 978-1473658349)
- The Gift, Hodder & Stoughton 2022 (ISBN 978-1473-65906-3)

=== Poetry ===
- Marigolds, Myrtle and Moles: A Gardener's Bedside Book, Hodder & Stoughton 2020 (ISBN 978-1-529-31115-0)

== Filmography ==
Year	Title	Role	Notes
1979–1984	Nationwide	Gardening Expert	
1984–1986	Breakfast Time	Gardening Expert	
1986	Open Air	Co-Presenter	
1987–1991	Daytime Live	Presenter	
1989–1994	Songs of Praise	Presenter	
2002	How To Be A Gardener	Presenter	
1983–2013	RHS Chelsea Flower Show	Co-presenter	
1991	Titchmarsh's Travels	Presenter	
1991–1996	Pebble Mill	Presenter	
1996–2002	Gardeners' World	Presenter	
1997–2002	Ground Force	Presenter	
2004	British Isles – A Natural History	Presenter	
2005	20th Century Roadshow	Presenter	
2005	Gordon the Garden Gnome	Voice of Gordon	
2006	The Paul O'Grady Show	Guest presenter	1 episode
2007	The Nature of Britain	Presenter	Documentary series
2007	The Great British Village Show	Presenter	
2007–2014	The Alan Titchmarsh Show	Presenter	15 series
2010	Popstar to Operastar	Co-presenter	Series 1; with Myleene Klass
2011–2023	Love Your Garden	Co-presenter	8 series
2012	Elizabeth: Queen, Wife, Mother	Presenter	One-off programme
2013	The Great British Winter	Presenter	
2014	The Queen's Garden	Presenter	Two-part series
2015	Britain's Best Back Gardens	Presenter	1 series
2015	Titchmarsh on Capability Brown	Presenter	Three Part documentary
2016–2017	Masterpiece with Alan Titchmarsh	Co-presenter	2 series; with Rachel Houston-Holland
2016	Winnie-the-Pooh: The Most Famous Bear in the World	Presenter	One-off documentary
2017–2019	Secrets of the National Trust	Presenter	2 series
2017	Royal Windsor Horse Show Live	Presenter	One-off special
2017	Prince Philip: 70 Years of Service	Presenter	One-off special
2017–present	Love Your Home and Garden	Presenter	1 series
2020–present	Love Your Weekend with Alan Titchmarsh	Presenter	6 series
2021–2022	Alan Titchmarsh: Spring Into Summer	Presenter	1 series
2021	Love Your Cottage Garden Special	Presenter	One-off special
2024 – present	Alan Titchmarsh’s Gardening Club	Presenter	Two series
