= Tommy Walsh (builder) =

English television presenter and celebrity builder (1956–2026)

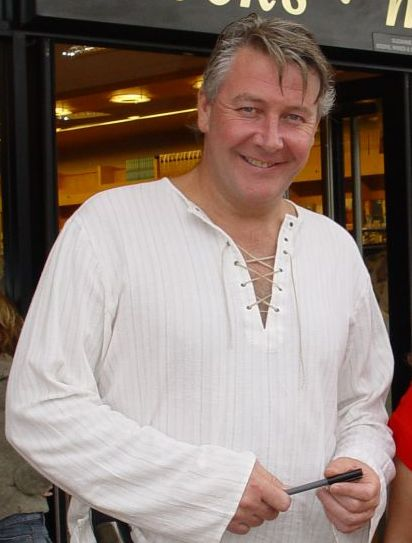
- Walsh in 2004
- Born: Thomas Walsh; 18 December 1956; Hackney, London, England
- Died: 9 November 2026 (aged 69)
- Occupations: Television presenter; gardener; builder
- Spouse: Marie Walsh
- Children: 3

Thomas Walsh (18 December 1956 – 9 November 2026) was an English television personality, presenter and builder best known for the gardening and do-it-yourself television shows Ground Force (1997–2005) and Challenge Tommy Walsh (2002–2005).

== Early life ==
Thomas Walsh was born in Hackney, London, on 18 December 1956 to Irish Catholic parents James and Margaret Walsh who had emigrated from Ireland. He was educated at Parmiter's School, then a grammar school, in Bethnal Green, and later became a builder. When he was 15, Leyton Orient F.C. offered him a trial, but he had lost interest in football.

== Career ==
When he was working on the house of a BBC producer, Walsh was recommended for two television pilots, including Over the Garden Wall, which became the BBC television gardening programme Ground Force. He turned down the role three times, considering the show "like watching paint dry", but took it on because his 8-year-old daughter had made a bet that he would be on TV. He came to public attention after appearing on Ground Force with Alan Titchmarsh, where he was responsible for the hard landscaping. He stayed with the show for the rest of its run, from 1997 to 2005. Ground Force reached peak audiences of 13 million, and Walsh attributed its popularity to his confrontations with Titchmarsh.

He presented other do-it-yourself series including Challenge Tommy Walsh and Trading Places for the Discovery Channel. He created the latter series, in which he learned different building skills. In 2021, Walsh joined Homes Under the Hammer. It was announced three years later that he had been replaced by Owain Wyn Evans. After speculation that this was a production decision due to his age, a staff member said that Walsh had resigned because of health issues.

Walsh had a small acting role in the film One. He also appeared on Lily Savage's Blankety Blank and in 2023 he was a contestant on the BBC quiz show Pointless.

== Personal life and death ==
Walsh was married to Marie and they had three children.

He was patron of the Stairway to Heaven Memorial Trust.

In 2002, Walsh had a benign tumour removed from his chest. He then raised awareness of breast cancer in men. In 2022, he was diagnosed with throat cancer, underwent surgery and fully recovered. He said in 2024 that doctors had found a tumour in his lung. He died on 9 November 2026, aged 69, after a long illness.

== Television work ==
Walsh presented several television shows, including:

- Challenge Tommy Walsh (2002–2005, with Alan Herd)
- Space Invaders
- Tommy Walsh's Eco House (2010)
- Trading Places
- Tommy's Ultimate Workshop
- Tommy's DIY Survival
- Ground Force (1997–2005)
- Our House
- Fix Your House For Free
- Celebrity Fit Club
- Flip That House with Tommy Walsh
- Cowboys & Angels (BBC)
- Me and my son Greg (2017)
- Homes Under the Hammer (2021–2024)
- Clean It, Fix It (2021–2025)

== Publications ==
- Ground Force: Practical Garden Projects (2000), BBC Books
- Ground Force: Garden Handbook (2001), BBC Books – with Alan Titchmarsh and Charlie Dimmock
- Tommy Walsh's DIY Guide (2001), Focus Multimedia Ltd – CD-ROM
- DIY Survival (2002), Collins
- Bathroom DIY (2004), Collins
- Kitchen DIY (2004), Collins
- Living Spaces DIY (2004), Collins
- Outdoor DIY (2004), Collins
