= Mountbatten School =

Coordinates: 50.984°N 1.470°W

The Mountbatten School

Location
- Whitenap Lane; Romsey, Hampshire, SO51 5SY; England

Information
- Type: Secondary academy
- Motto: We Care, We Respect, We Achieve
- Established: 1969
- Founder: Lord Louis Mountbatten
- Local authority: Hampshire County Council
- Specialist: Language College, Sports College
- Department for Education URN: 136640 Tables
- Ofsted: Reports
- Chair of Trustees: Paul Urben
- Headteacher: Chris Cox
- Gender: Coeducational
- Age: 11 to 16
- Enrolment: c. 1450 pupils
- Houses: Wishart, Daring, Kelly, Lion and Illustrious
- Colours: Yellow, Green, Blue, Red, Silver
- CEO of the Trust: Heather McIlroy
- Website: The Mountbatten School

The Mountbatten School is an 11–16 secondary school located on Whitenap Lane in Romsey, Hampshire, England. The school is an Academy, but opened in 1969 as a comprehensive.

== Specialist status and national awards ==
The school became a Language College in 2000, and gained Sports College status in September 2004. In September 2006, the school became the hub of the Mountbatten School Sports Partnership with several local schools.

In 2012, the school was recognised by the Specialist Schools and Academies Trust as one of the hundred most-improved schools in England. The school joined the Leading Edge Network in 2012.

== Facilities ==
Following a number of successful financial appeals and external funding bids, the school facilities have grown and developed since 1969. The original building, simply referred to as the main building, contains the 10 English classrooms and 11 Science classrooms, the school hall, and the dining hall facilities. Three geography classrooms, two religious classrooms, and four Art classrooms are housed in the Jubilee Building towards the north west of the school campus which was refurbished in 2012. Sport has the original gymnasium, a sports hall opened in 1985 by Prince Charles, a fitness suite (which is also open to the public), and a sports science laboratory. Three IT suites and six technology classrooms are housed in the Mulberry Building, which was rebuilt in 2013. Brabourne building, opened in 1985, located at the eastern edge of the campus, houses five modern foreign languages classes and twelve mathematics classes. Brabourne was opened by Patricia, Countess Mountbatten of Burma . The Lantern Theatre building contains the drama and music classrooms, including a recording studio and theatre. There is a separate dedicated Student Services Building, which houses the learning support faculty. Following refurbishment, the building was opened in 2014.

The school's trading subsidiary, Personal Best Education, is housed in the Viceroy building.

There are three Mac suites in the Lantern Theatre and Lower Humanities building for music and art studies. There are playing fields and play courts around the site.

== Academy status ==
The Mountbatten School gained academy status on 1 April 2011.

== Transport and Catchment ==
The Mountbatten School provide of transportation to and from the school to assist students living more than three miles from the campus. Students who live in Nursling, Rownhams, Hillyfields, North Baddessley and Wellow are eligible for free travel via the school buses provided by the Local Authority.

Students living outside of the school catchment area are usually not assisted with travel expenses, however a single school bus designated the 504 is provided by Bluestar Bus to provide transport for students living in the Southampton end of the non-catchment area. Students living in the Romsey/Abbotswood end of the non-catchment area have access to non-catchment minibuses provided by school staff.

== Notable alumni ==
- Terry Bartlett - gymnast, competed for Great Britain at the 1984, 1988 and 1992 Olympic Games.
- Steve Basham - former professional footballer; played 19 games for Southampton F.C. in the Premier League.
- Joe Brooks - singer / songwriter.
- Laura Carmichael - actress.
- Andy Cook - former professional footballer.
- Julia Copus - poet, biographer and children's writer.
- Richard Dibden - former Hampshire cricketer.
- Charlie Dimmock - television presenter and gardener.
- Sarah-Jane Hutt - Miss World in 1983.
- Lukas Jutkiewicz - former Swindon and Everton striker, now playing for Birmingham City.
- Martin Kellaway - cricketer.
- Sam McQueen - former Southampton F.C. professional footballer.
- Melanie Purkiss - athlete. Reached the semi-finals of the 400 metres in the 2002 Commonwealth Games.
