= Campion School (Athens) =

English-language private school in Greece

Coordinates: 37.9967°N 23.8962°E

Campion School is an English-language private international school in Athens, Greece, which provides an adapted British educational curriculum to approximately 650 children of foreign residents, the Greek diaspora and local Greeks, from Nursery through to Year 13 (ages three to eighteen). The pupils come from more than 40 countries.

== History ==
Campion School was founded in 1970 in Athens, Greece, by American banker and philhellene Thomas Shortell, his wife Betsy Shortell, and American businessman, and later diplomat, Burke O'Connor as an independent, non-profit Anglo-American school governed by a board of trustees.

The academic programme is based on the National Curriculum (England and Wales) adapted to Greek culture and society. It facilitates the examinations of its students in the IGCSE, IB and checkpoint examinations.

== Details ==
The School is located in purpose-built premises in the suburb of Pallini, 16 km (9.9 mi) east of Athens city center.

Campion is an accredited member of COBIS (Council of British International Schools). and ECIS (European Council of International Schools).

== Pupils ==
Each student is organised into one of the houses, which are named after legendary Greek heroes Alexander, Pericles, Theseus and Heracles. Merits and house points are given to students when exceptional effort is made. Pupils are required to wear a uniform up to and including Year 11; students in Years 12 and 13 must adhere to a dress code.

The pupils are divided into Nursery, Reception, Junior (years one through six) and Senior (years seven through thirteen) divisions which, while previously housed at different locations, are now combined on the same premises but in separate buildings.

== School activities and curriculum ==
Campion School holds its MUN (Model United Nations), the CSMUN, annually in October.

Campion school holds performances such as the Christmas concert (organised by the Music Department), Junior and Senior summer concerts, the staff concert, musicals (arranged by the Drama and Music departments), and talks during assemblies from professionals outside the school.

== Former headmasters ==
- 1970-1973 Richard Forbes, MA (Cantab)
- 1973-1980 Jack Meyer (educator and cricketer), the founder of Millfield in England and St Lawrence College, Athens
- 1980-1983 Thomas Howarth
- 1983-1988 Anthony F Eggleston
- 1988-1990 C. Douglas Juckes
- 1990-1991 Dennis Mackinnon
- 1991-2020 Stephen W Atherton (educator and pianist)
- 2020-2021 Duncan Rose
- 2021-2025 Mike Henderson

== Notable alumni ==
- Mario Frangoulis, 1985 - Tenor
- Sunita Shroff, actress and TV presenter
- Jonathan Rendall Award Winning Writer
- Toni Garrn - Model
- Melia Kreiling - Actor for The Borgias, Salvation, Filthy Rich, Mammals
- Victor Vernicos, singer and songwriter
