= Masterpiece (game show) =

British game show (2016–2017)

- Also known as: Masterpiece with Alan Titchmarsh
- Genre: Game show
- Created by: Alan Titchmarsh
- Presented by: Alan Titchmarsh; Rachel Houston-Holland
- Theme music composer: Paul Farrer
- Country of origin: United Kingdom
- Original language: English
- No. of series: 2
- No. of episodes: 40

Production
- Running time: 60 minutes (inc. adverts)
- Production company: Spun Gold TV

Original release
- Network: ITV
- Release: 15 February 2016 – 16 June 2017

Masterpiece is a game show that aired on ITV from 15 February 2016 to 16 June 2017 and is presented by Alan Titchmarsh and Rachel Houston-Holland.

== Background ==
Filming took place at three stately homes up – Parham House in West Sussex, Kentwell Hall in Suffolk and Firle Place in East Sussex. The show is presented by Alan Titchmarsh, who came up with the idea for the show, and Rachel Houston-Holland, a Knutsford-based arts expert.

== Format ==
Three pairs play the game. To decide the order of play, the teams must value an item. The team whose valuation is the closest goes first.

=== Valuation ===
The teams must pick what they believe the highest-rated item from an assortment laid out on a table to be. The team which picks the highest-valued item amongst the team wins.

=== Masterpiece Gallery ===
The winner of Valuation picks what they believe to be the 'masterpiece', worth £10,000 or more. Values are not revealed until the end of the programme.

=== Stately Home ===
Teams are sent off around the home to look around for two items and take photographs of them on tablets; the winners are the team with the highest number of accurate photos, followed by the speed of arrival. The teams then return to the Masterpiece Gallery.

=== Distinctly Vintage ===
Four items, such as cars or dresses, are laid out and revealed one-at-a-time. The first is a benchmark item, and the team that came last in Stately Home must guess whether their item is older or newer than the benchmark item. If they guess correctly, they win a point; if they can date them to a suitable degree of accuracy – with the cars, it was the year and with the dresses it was the decade – they win another. The teams who came second and first in Stately Home repeat that process in that order and the teams' placings in this round sort the order of play for the subsequent Masterpiece Gallery round. If there is a tie, the teams involved must stick a value on the item and closest valuation wins.

=== Bamboozle ===
The team which came in last in Distinctly Vintage must pick an item for another team to identify from three options; if they guess correctly, they win a point, should they guess incorrectly - however - the team who selected them to play are awarded one for bamboozlement. The playing team then selects an item for the uninvolved team in the previous 'duel' and the process repeats itself; that team then picks an item for the first team and the process repeats. One final round of Masterpiece Gallery is played before the values are revealed; the team with the most masterpieces wins £1,000.

== Transmissions ==
Series	Start date	End date	Episodes
1	15 February 2016	11 March 2016	20
2	15 May 2017	16 June 2017	25
