= Top Ground Gear Force =

- Presented by: Jeremy Clarkson; Richard Hammond; James May
- Country of origin: United Kingdom
- No. of episodes: 1

Production
- Running time: 30 minutes (45 minutes with charity breaks)

Original release
- Network: BBC Two
- Release: 14 March 2008

Related
- Top Gear, Ground Force

Top Ground Gear Force is a one-off TV special, featuring the presenters of BBC's Top Gear, which originally aired on BBC Two at 22:00 GMT on 14 March 2008 as part of Sport Relief 2008. It was repeated on Easter Monday, 2008.

It borrowed its format from Top Gear of the Pops, a similar one-off special which aired as part of Comic Relief 2007. Whereas Top Gear of The Pops combined Top Gear with Top of the Pops, this episode combines the motoring show with Ground Force, a gardening makeover show which ran on the BBC from 1998 to 2005.

Regular Top Gear hosts Jeremy Clarkson, James May and Richard Hammond take over sportsman Steve Redgrave's garden, to dispense advice on creating a zero maintenance lawn, installing an impressive water feature and getting rid of unwanted plants. Naturally, disaster ensues. Top Ground Gear Force was then included as a page in the 2009 Big Book of Top Gear, giving advice to garden problems including concreting the garden over, petrol bombs and flash fires.

== Synopsis ==
Clarkson and May 'pretend' to attack Hammond with shovels

Rear of Jeremy Clarkson's jacket

The Top Gear team impersonate and belittle the show Ground Force, and provide a garden makeover for British Olympian Sir Steve Redgrave. Helping them are a team of "Foreign Nationals", and on hand to provide advice on Redgrave's tastes was his wife, Ann Redgrave, who was erroneously addressed and referred to as "Lady Ann" rather than the proper "Lady Redgrave".

As the team's only 'country bumpkin', Hammond decided to designate himself as the team leader. However, his plan to build a 'river of gravel' failed to impress Clarkson and May, who wanted to include a water feature and a shed, respectively. Deciding to go ahead with his plans to create a 'river of gravel', Hammond uses a small Caterpillar digger to dig a trench in the garden. Meanwhile, Clarkson and May arrive back from a garden center with their desired equipment, only to destroy the push bike of one of Redgrave's children.

After crashing the digger, Hammond sets out building a round-the-tree seat to be placed at the end of his 'river of gravel'. However, Clarkson quickly points out that despite the seat being complete, Hammond has no way of placing it around the tree, as it has been constructed as a sole piece.

Later, Clarkson has the tricky job of removing a rockery in order to build his water feature. His explanation of his decision for using a homemade bomb to finish the job quickly and easily is made more difficult with the arrival of the Salvation Army Brass Band drowning his voice out. Ultimately, the bomb is successful, destroying the rockery in one clean sweep—and all of the windows and one of the walls of May's shed.

Afterwards, Clarkson moves on to his next project—erecting rugby posts in the garden, despite being told that none of Redgrave's family plays rugby. With May having successfully rebuilt his shed again, it's not long before Clarkson and the Poles lose grip on the rugby posts, and destroy part of the shed again. Hammond, then, has moved on to his last project, a turbo-charged barbecue system, which allows the user to cook varieties of meat in under five minutes, using a jet engine to rotate the meat and cook it. Mays shed is then set on fire by the out-of-control jet engine. An enraged and frantic James May attempts to put the fire out before it can take hold, but he is unable to grab hold of the fire extinguisher which Clarkson now holds.

In the midst of this latest calamity, the team suddenly receives word that Redgrave is now pulling into the drive. Despite two abandoned Caterpillar diggers, an abandoned crane, a burning shed, a ruined lawn and a destructive barbecue, the team are forced to go ahead and unveil the garden to a furious Redgrave. Clarkson and May initially attempt to blame the entire debacle on Hammond, but eventually, after Clarkson talking to him privately, lightening Redgrave's mood.

The special ends when Clarkson activates his turbo-powered water feature which sends the top of the fountain flying through the air and crashing into the greenhouse he built, destroying every window upon impact.

== Ratings ==
On its first showing in the UK on BBC Two, the programme obtained 4.5 million viewers which equated to a 22% audience share for its timeslot between 10pm and 10.40pm. The programme was part of the Sport Relief fundraising evening. The Sport Relief programmes preceding it on BBC One between 7pm and 10pm averaged 6.2 million viewers (28% audience share) and the Sport Relief programmes on BBC One between 10.50pm and 1am averaged 2.6 million viewers (29% audience share).
