= Richard Dibden =

English cricketer (born 1975)

Personal information
- Full name: Richard Rockley Dibden
- Born: 29 January 1975 (age 51); Southampton, Hampshire, England
- Batting: Right-handed
- Bowling: Right-arm off break

Domestic team information
- Years: Team
- 1995: Hampshire
- 2001–2002: Hampshire Cricket Board

Career statistics
Competition	First-class	List A
Matches	5	3
Runs scored	1	18
Batting average	0.16	9.00
100s/50s	–/–	–/–
Top score	1	13
Balls bowled	835	162
Wickets	8	4
Bowling average	74.00	32.00
5 wickets in innings	–	–
10 wickets in match	–	–
Best bowling	2/36	2/40
Catches/stumpings	–/–	2/–
- Source: Cricinfo, 14 April 2023

Richard Rockley Dibden (born 29 January 1975) is a former English cricketer.

== Cricket career ==
Dibden was born at Southampton in January 1975. He was educated at The Mountbatten School at Romsey, before matriculating to Loughborough University. Having played his early club cricket for Gosport Borough Cricket Club, Dibden made his debut in first-class cricket for Hampshire against Yorkshire at Southampton in the 1995 County Championship. He made four further first-class appearances for Hampshire, all of which came in 1995. Playing as an off break bowler, he took six wickets for Hampshire at an average of 71.33, with best figures of 2 for 36. He also made a single first-class appearance for the British Universities cricket team against the touring Indians at Fenner's in 1996, with Dibden taking the wickets of Sanjay Manjrekar and Mohammad Azharuddin in the match. After the end of his first-class career, Dibden returned to club cricket with BAT Sports (later renamed Totton and Eling Cricket Club). Dibden made three appearances in List A one-day cricket for the Hampshire Cricket Board (Note: The Hampshire Cricket Board (HCB), formed in 1996, is the governing body for recreational cricket in the county of Hampshire. It entered a largely amateur team in the minor counties one-day Knockout Trophy between 1998 and 2002, and took part alongside the first-class and minor counties, and other cricket boards, in the List A domestic one-day competition between 1999 and 2003. The HCB is a separate entity to Hampshire County Cricket Club, which was formed in 1863, and is the professional representative team for the county of Hampshire.), against Ireland in the 2nd round of the 2002 Cheltenham & Gloucester Trophy, and against Wiltshire and Staffordshire in the 1st and 2nd rounds of the 2002 Cheltenham & Gloucester Trophy respectively. In these, he took 4 wickets at an average of exactly 32, with best figures of 2 for 40.

Outside of cricket, Dibden joined CMA Recruitment Group in 1999, where he is still employed as of 2026.
