= Macmillan 4x4 UK Challenge =

Event logo

The Macmillan 4x4 UK Challenge was an annual navigational endurance challenge event. It is open to any road legal 4x4 vehicle in aid of Macmillan Cancer Support. The event has run since 2002 over one weekend in March each year and consists of a series of on road treasure hunts interspersed with off-road challenges. The event covers up to 1,000 miles and raises up to in excess of £100,000 for Macmillan Cancer Support each year.

No special vehicle modifications are required to enter, any sensibly equipped 4x4 should be able to complete the event. Each team has a minimum sponsorship to raise all of which goes to Macmillan. All event, costs are covered out of the entry fee except fuel which competitors pay for as they go.

Competitors only know where they are starting from, the route being kept secret till roadbooks are handed out along the way. It generally ends in Cheshire where there is a prize-giving dinner and accommodation for the night at a hotel.

== Background ==
In May 2000 a group of enthusiasts saw a gap in the 4x4 events programme and decided to introduce a new event to mark the Millennium. The objective being to provide an interesting 'Challenge' for 4x4 owners/addicts/enthusiasts over a weekend ‘somewhere’ in the UK, whilst supporting a worthy charity.

"The Macmillan 4x4 UK Challenge" was 'born'. After two false starts, in November 2000 because of a petrol blockade and March 2001 due to Foot and Mouth. The inaugural run of the event eventually took place with only 8 teams in March 2002 and £8,000 was raised for Macmillan Cancer Relief.

In 2007 60 teams started (The maximum number that the organisers felt the event could maintain), and raised £110,000

The 2008 event covered approximately 800 miles and covered 5 countries - England, Wales, Southern and Northern Ireland and Scotland, the final total raised was £109,000

== Support ==
The event has been supported by a number of celebrities including Charlie Dimmock, Lynn Bowles, Sunita Shroff, Julia Bradbury, Charlie Webster MBE, Jaye Griffiths and Marisa Wayne (the daughter of John Wayne).

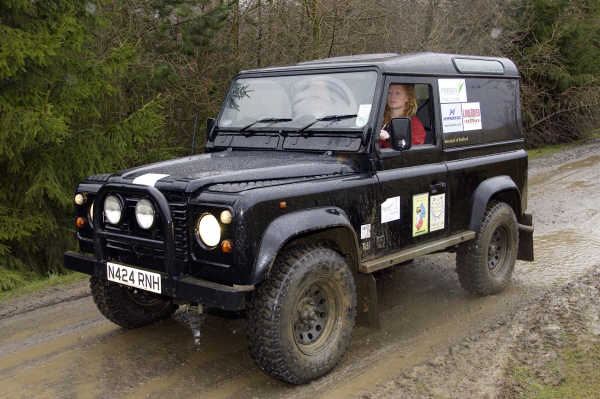
Charlie Dimmock

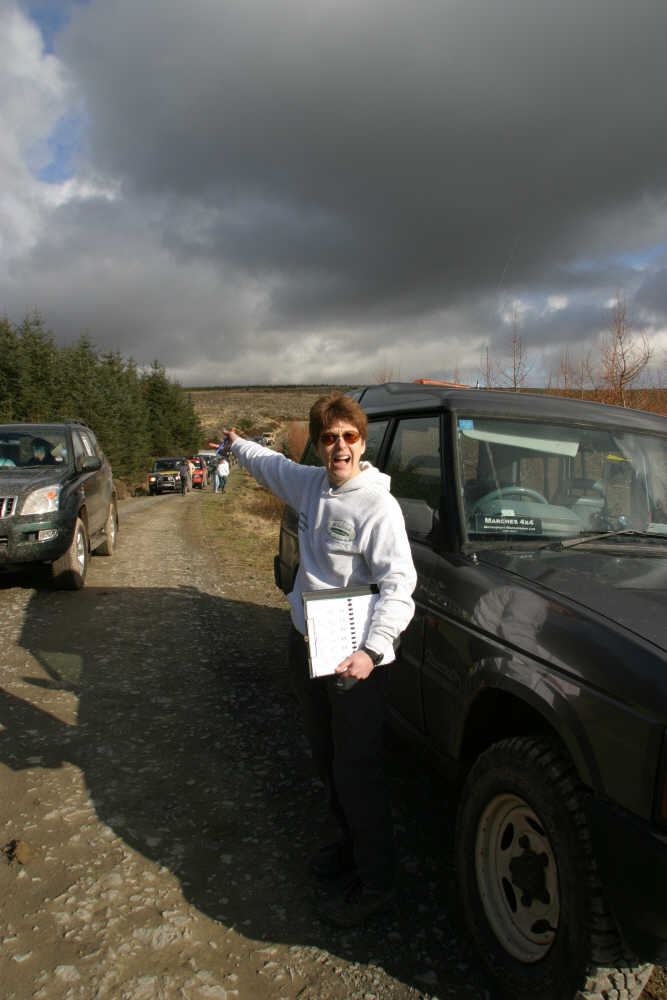
Lynn Bowles

Sunita Shroff

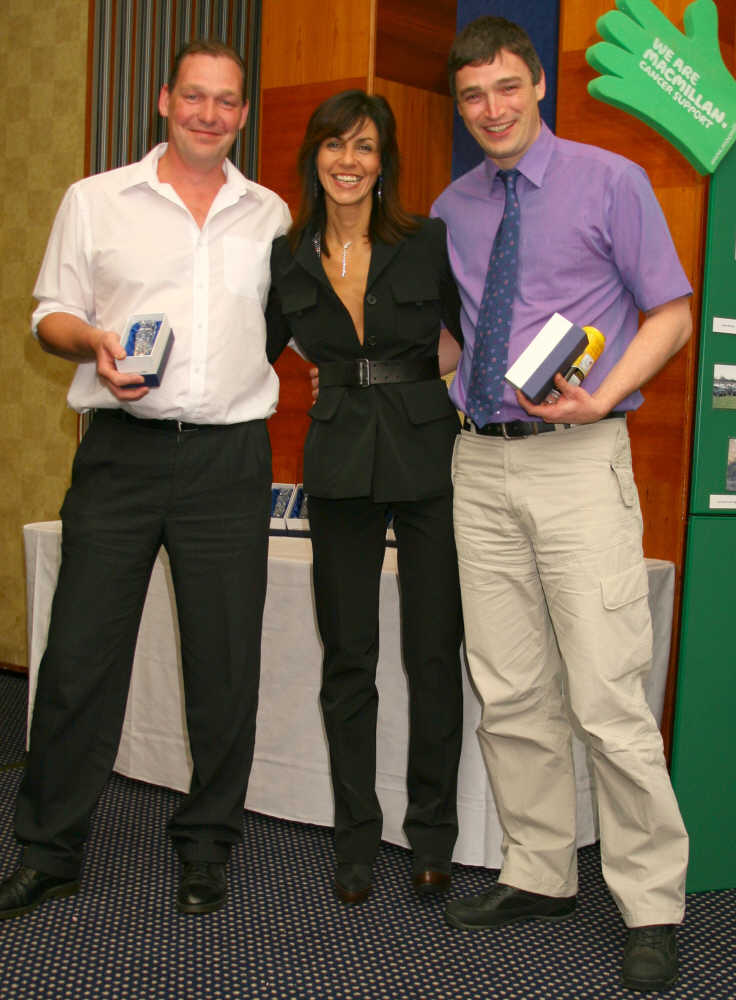
Julia Bradbury

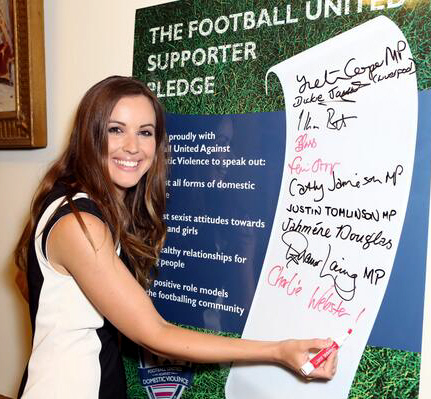
Charlie Webster MBE

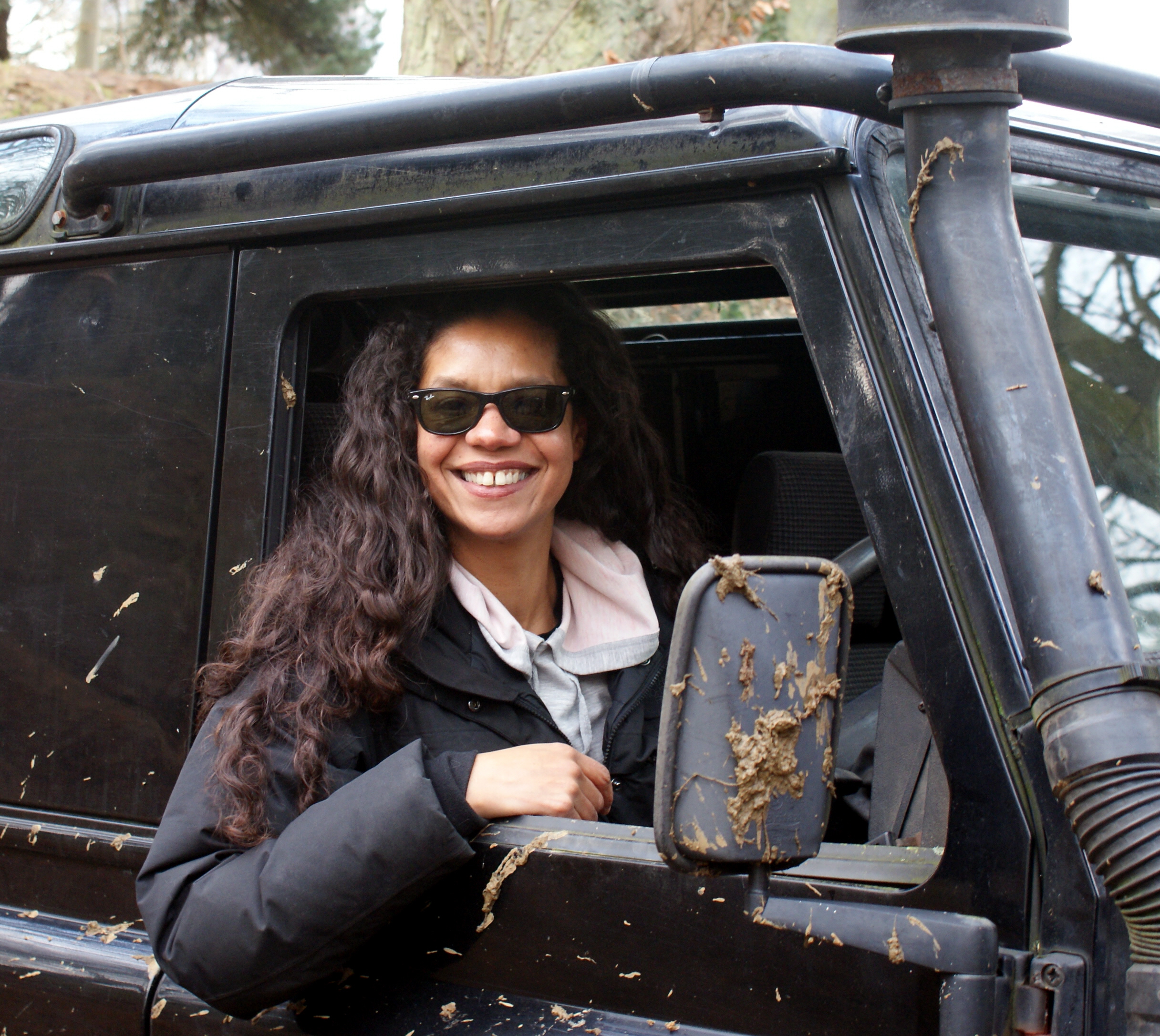
Jaye Griffiths

== Events ==
=== 2009 Event ===
The applications for 2009 opened on the evening of 15 April 2008 and all 60 places had been taken by the post delivered on Saturday 19 April. Publicity for the event received a boost in August 2008 when TV presenter Julia Bradbury agreed to be the celebrity driver for the March 2009 run. The event started on 6 March and raised £80,000 at the prize giving dinner on 8 March. With a final total of £106,115.30 in July 2009

=== 2010 Event ===
The entry form for the 2010 event went on line on the Macmillan 4x4 UK Challenge web site on 1 April 2009, all entries were taken up within two days, at which point a reserve list was opened. A month later due to the extra demand entries were extended to 90 teams. One week before the event it was announced that TV sports presenter, Charlie Webster would be the celebrity competitor for the year. Due to the cost of fuel, the event format was lower mileage than previously, with the majority of challenges being set in the Aberystwyth area.

In May 2010 it was announced that the year's event had raised a record £123,000

=== 2011 Event ===
At the end of March 2010 it was announced that Marisa Wayne, youngest daughter of the Hollywood actor John Wayne, would be competing as the co-driver in 'Team Duke' for the 2011 10th anniversary run of the event, which also marked the 100th anniversary of Macmillan Cancer Support.

The event was extended to four days to mark the anniversary, with the longest mileage since the inaugural 2002 run. After the organising team discovered that the 2011 celebrity co-driver, Marisa Wayne had never been to Ireland and that her favourite movie was her father’s The Quiet Man the event was engineered to give her and all the other competitors the opportunity to visit Cong in Ireland the village where it was filmed, and see the scenery of County Galway and County Mayo. Immediately after the event a running total of £89,000 raised for Macmillan was declared, with a final total announced in August 2011 of £120,059.

=== 2012 Event ===
In April 2011 entries opened for the 2012 event from March 2 to 4. For the first time in a number of years the event was under subscribed with 63 teams taking part. The event took a similar format to the 2010 run with the majority of challenges being in the forests surrounding Newcastleton in the Scottish borders. At the prize giving dinner a running total of £63,000 raised for Macmillan Cancer Support was announced. A final total of £81,949.59 was announced later that year bringing the event's running total to £860,085

=== 2013 Event ===
In April 2012 entries opened for the 2013 event from March 1 to 3. In January 2013 it was announced that TV and stage actress Jaye Griffiths would be competing.
