= Alan Herd =

British television personality

Alan Herd is a British artisan, a specialist woodworker and TV presenter of hobby and restoration projects often screened on Discovery Real Time TV channels.

A native of Hickling, a village in south Nottinghamshire near to Melton Mowbray and the border with Leicestershire, Herd was concerned about the increasing flood risk across the world, and developed a defence system called Wata-Wall, a flexible barrage system of portable interlocking plastic containers which are assembled into an array then filled with water for stability, creating a temporary dam. All association with "Wata-Wall" and Willy Johnson has now ceased but invention is still a big part of Alan's life.

== Shows ==
- Challenge Tommy Walsh with Tommy Walsh
- Narrow Boat
- Narrow Boat Afloat
- Narrow Boat Afloat 2
- Restoration man with Eric Knowles
- Barn free
- The Water Boatman with Alan Herd
