= Ground Force =

British television series

- Genre: Gardening, makeover
- Created by: Peter Bazalgette
- Presented by: Alan Titchmarsh; Charlie Dimmock; Tommy Walsh; Will Shanahan; Kirsty King
- Theme music composer: Jim Parker
- Country of origin: United Kingdom
- Original language: English
- No. of series: 14
- No. of episodes: 115

Production
- Running time: 30 minutes
- Production companies: Bazal (1997–2002); Endemol UK Productions (2002–2005)

Original release
- Network: BBC Two (1997); BBC One (1998–2005)
- Release: 19 September 1997 – 24 July 2005

Related
- Ground Force America; Top Ground Gear Force

Ground Force is a British garden makeover television series originally broadcast by the BBC between 1997 and 2005. The series was originally hosted by Alan Titchmarsh, Charlie Dimmock and Tommy Walsh.

== Production ==
The series was created by Peter Bazalgette and was first broadcast on 19 September 1997 on BBC Two. In each episode, a team of gardeners make over the garden of an individual who has been nominated by a member of their family or a friend. Whilst that individual is away, the team, assisted by friends and family, make over the garden over two days, and surprise the individual on their return. The team was led by Alan Titchmarsh, presenter of Pebble Mill at One and Gardeners' World, gardener Charlie Dimmock, builder Tommy Walsh and his assistant Will Shanahan. Dimmock met the producer–director of the series five years previously when she built a pond for the Meridian series Grass Roots. Walsh was invited to take part after completing work on the executive producer's garden.

The series moved to BBC One for the second series. Titchmarsh left in 2002. Kirsty King joined the team after Titchmarsh left.

A number of new five-minute segments were filmed for Ground Force Revisited and appended onto repeats of earlier episodes, where Dimmock and Walsh revisited the garden concerned to surprise the owners and see how the gardens had developed.

The series was credited with helping the increase in sales of garden decking in the late 1990s and early 2000s due to its use during the series. Retailer B&Q had sales rise from £5,000 in 1997 to £16 million in 2001.

The series was cancelled in 2005. Describing its cancellation, BBC Director-General Mark Thompson said that the series was "reaching the end of its natural life" and that "the public do get very cross when they see the BBC flogging a dead horse".

At its peak, the series attracted 12 million viewers. Repeats of Ground Force are currently shown on Home.

== Music ==
The theme music for the series was performed by the Black Dyke Band, and included the following pieces:

- Ground Force Theme — played during the show's opening and closing.
- The Titchmarsh Warbler — a fast tempo piece usually played during the rush to complete the garden.
- Lament of the Dandelion — played near the end of the show as Titchmarsh surveyed the completed garden.

== Specials ==
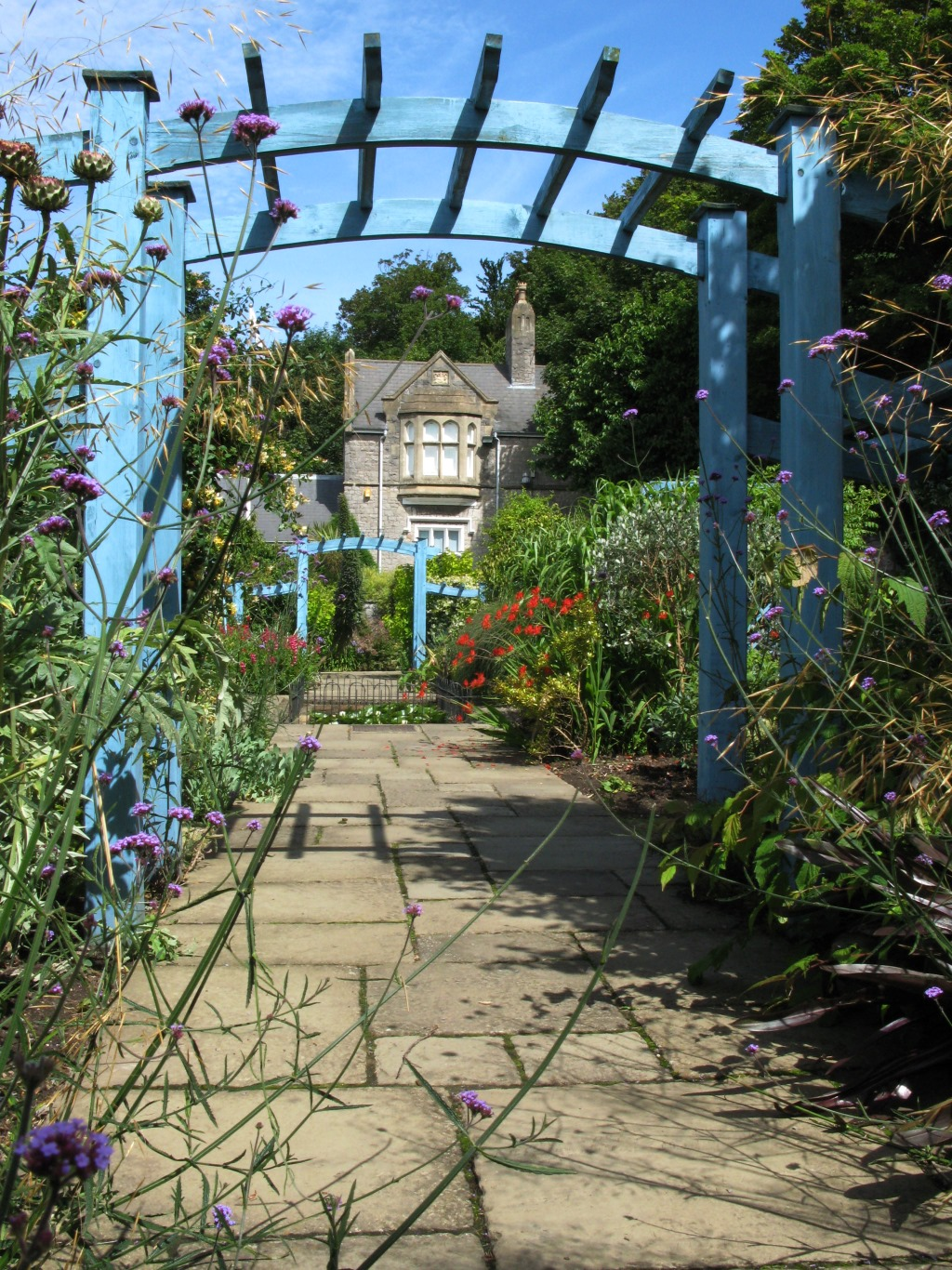
Jill's Garden in Weston-super-Mare, built by the team in memory of Jill Dando.

The team worked on a number of other special projects, including:

- a garden in memory of TV presenter Jill Dando in her home town of Weston-super-Mare
- the New York Restoration Project garden near Ground Zero in New York, for singer Bette Midler
- an Old Servicemen's Home garden in Jamaica
- a Children's Home garden in New Delhi, India
- the home of former President of South Africa, Nelson Mandela

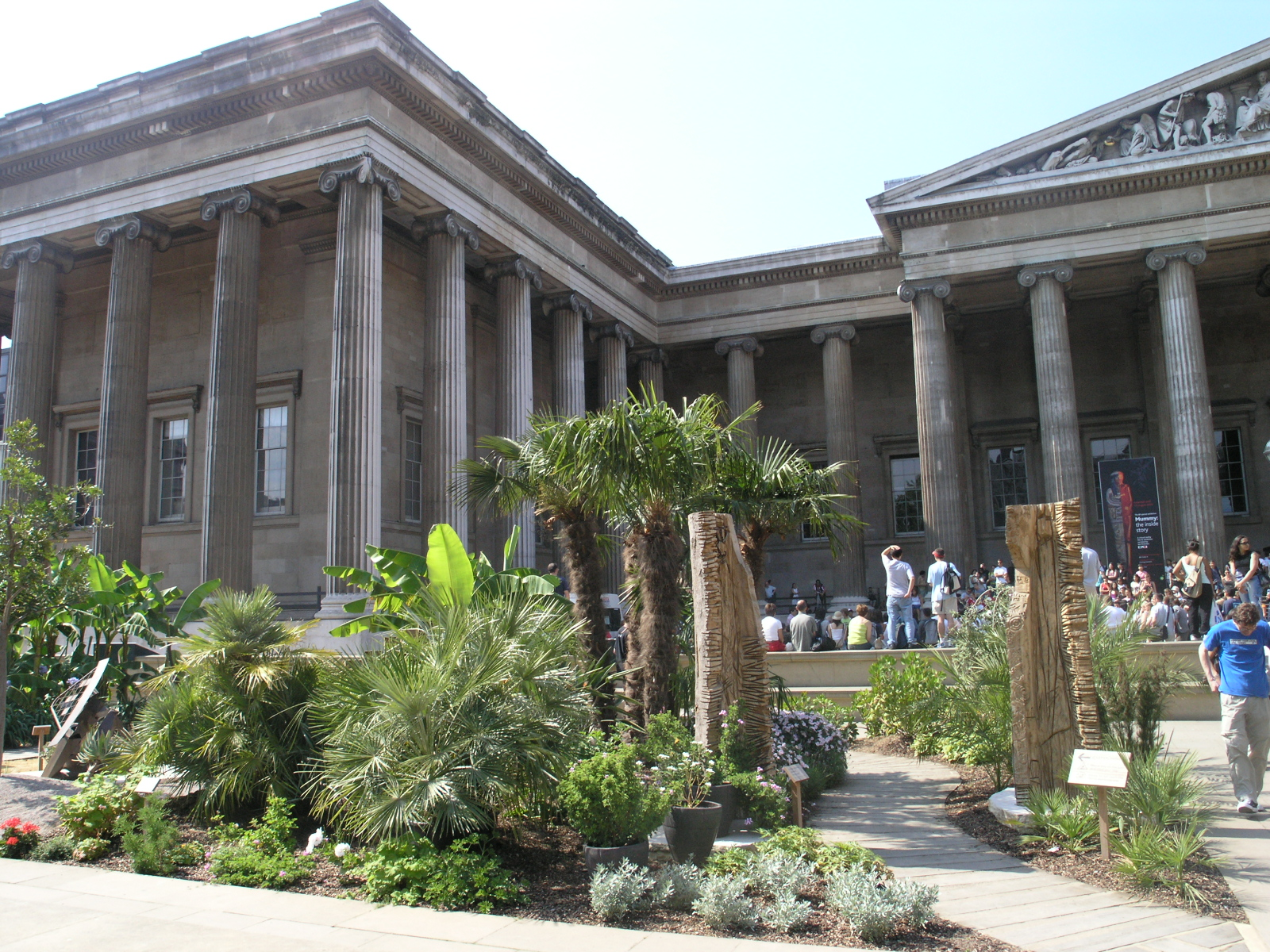
The Africa Garden at the British Museum.

The Ground Force team's final episode was aired in July 2005. It took place in the forecourt of the British Museum in London, where the team designed and created the Africa Garden as part of the Africa 05 celebration, the biggest celebration of African culture organised in the UK. The design of the garden features temperate, tropical and desert zones.

== International versions ==
A New Zealand version of Ground Force aired on TV One from 1998 to 2003. It was titled Firth Ground Force, named after a local concrete and masonry company.

In 2000, the producers sought legal advice after accusing the Nine Network in Australia of producing a "carbon copy" of Ground Force entitled Backyard Blitz. A legitimate Australian version of Ground Force was already in production, and aired shortly after on the Seven Network. While this version of Ground Force was short lived, Backyard Blitz continued on until 2007.

Ground Force America is the American version, presented by Dimmock and Walsh. It began airing in 2003 on BBC America, and it was the channel's first original production. The channel had been airing the UK version since 1999.

== Top Gear and Ground Force Crossover 2008 ==
On 14 March 2008, Top Gear "resurrected" Ground Force in a Sport Relief special called Top Ground Gear Force where the presenters of Top Gear conducted a Ground Force style show on Sir Steve Redgrave's garden, who was livid at the intrusion.

== Transmissions ==
=== Original series ===
A total of 115 episodes of Ground Force were produced and shown (82 episodes comprising series 1–12 plus 15 specials), as well as an additional 12 episodes that make up Ground Force America:

Series	Start date	End date	Episodes
1	19 September 1997	7 November 1997	8
2	30 June 1998	18 August 1998	7
3	10 September 1998	1 October 1998	4
4	12 February 1999	5 March 1999	4
5	15 October 1999	19 November 1999	6
6	10 March 2000	14 April 2000	6
7	29 September 2000	26 November 2000 (Note: The final episode of that season was originally scheduled to air on 3 November 2000.)	6
8	22 April 2001	27 May 2001	5
9	7 January 2002	18 February 2002	6
10	2 September 2002	23 September 2002	4
11	27 January 2003	6 March 2003	5
12	1 March 2004	5 April 2004	6
13	6 December 2004	24 January 2005	6
14	31 January 2005	21 March 2005	8

=== Specials ===
Entitle	Air Date
Mandela Special	2 January 2000
When Changing Rooms Met Ground Force	12 February 2000
When Changing Rooms Met Ground Force 2	24 October 2000
Goes Air Force	11 December 2000
Goes East	18 April 2001
A Garden for Jill	24 August 2001
Goes West Indies	3 March 2002
Goes South Atlantic	16 June 2002
in New York	25 August 2002
The Italian Job	5 December 2002
Goes Festive	25 December 2002
Does Mardi Gras	21 April 2003
Goes to Ethiopia	29 December 2003
Goes to Hollywood	2 May 2004
Goes Merseyside	23 June 2004
On the Road to Marrakech	29 December 2004
A Garden for Africa '05	24 July 2005 (Note: This special was originally scheduled to air on 7 July 2005, but was postponed due to that day's London bombings.)

=== Ground Force America ===
Series	Start date	End date	Episodes
1	21 July 2003	8 September 2003	7
2	5 July 2004 (Note: This season's first episode was scheduled to air on 28 June 2004, but was postponed until 2 August, becoming the last episode of that season.)	2 August 2004	5
