= Charlie Webster (broadcaster) =

British broadcaster and campaigner

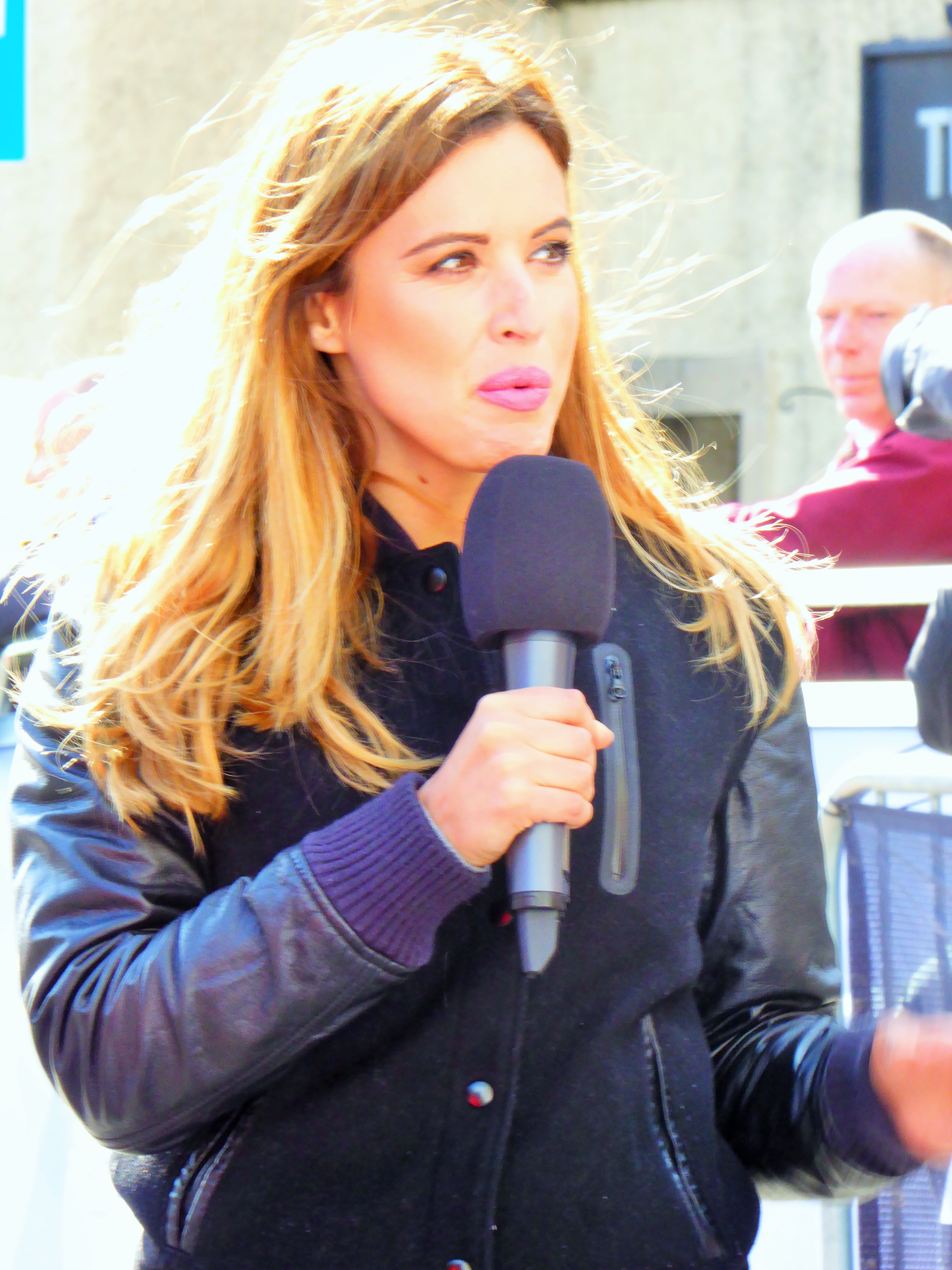
- Webster presenting the Edinburgh Tour Series round for ITV4 in May 2016
- Born: Charlotte Amy Serena Webster; 9 November 1982 (age 43); Sheffield, England
- Education: Tapton School in Sheffield and Newcastle University
- Occupation: TV presenter
- Employer(s): BBC, ITV4, Sky Sports, ESPN, Star Sports, Setanta Sports, Channel 4
- Website: charliewebster.com

Charlotte Amy Serena Webster MBE (born 9 November 1982) is a British broadcaster and campaigner. She was born in Sheffield, England, and has a degree in Language and Linguistics from Newcastle University. She started her career as a TV presenter for Real Madrid TV and then worked for various sports channels such as ESPN, Sky Sports, ITV4, and BoxNation. She has covered a wide range of sports events, including football, motorsport, boxing, triathlon, and the Olympics. She has launched several campaigns to raise awareness and funds for causes such as domestic violence, mental health, and malaria prevention.

== Early life and education ==
Charlotte Amy Serena Webster was born on 9 November 1982 in Sheffield and attended Tapton School where she participated in elite junior athletics. Webster's mother, Joy, who also attended the Tapton School, gave birth to her aged 16 and for her early childhood it was just the two of them and her grandparents. She has lived in Crookes, Newcastle Upon Tyne, and Leeds.

She studied Language and Linguistics at Newcastle University. At university, she worked as a personal trainer, fitness instructor and model.

== Career ==
=== Broadcasting ===
Webster's broadcasting career spans over 15 years and covers various sports channels and events. She started her career as a TV presenter for Real Madrid TV, interviewing the Galactico team and presenting football programmes. She then moved to Asia to join ESPN, where she presented live Premier League football, motorsport and Asian football.

She returned to the UK and worked for several sports channels, such as Sky Sports, Sky Sports News, Setanta Sports News, Channel 4, ITV4, BoxNation, and British Eurosport. She has covered sports such as motorsport, boxing, Cycling, triathlon, speedway, beach volleyball, athletics, and ice hockey. She made history by becoming the first female presenter of boxing coverage as Wladimir Klitschko defended his heavyweight belts against Alex Leapai in 2014. She also presented the women's boxing at the London 2012 Olympic Games, as well as the beach volleyball and the athletics for the Paralympics 2012.

=== Guest appearances ===
Webster has made guest appearances on Good Morning Britain, discussing breaking sports and social topics including the sacking of Jose Mourinho in 2015. She has also made guest appearances on BBC Radio 5 Live on Question Time Extra and Chiles on Friday.

=== Writing ===
Webster has written numerous sports columns, including a weekly football feature in the New Paper. She writes a blog on SkySports.com, and also writes for the Huffington Post, the Sheffield Star and football.co.uk. She writes a football column for Football Punk magazine and guest writes for The Independent and The Telegraph.

On 9 May 2024, Webster released her first book Why It's OK to Talk About Trauma.

=== Podcasts ===
Some of her podcasts include: Undiscussable, an investigative series into domestic abuse; My Sporting Mind, an intimate show that speaks to sports stars about mental health; Surviving El Chapo, a true crime story about the twins who brought down the drug lord Joaquín "El Chapo" Guzmán; the award winning Died and Survived, where she explores the mystery of near death experiences; and Scamanda, an investigation into the story of Amanda Riley, a woman who falsely claimed to be dying of cancer and fraudulently raised funds for supposed treatment. Webster's podcast 'Scamanda' was the most popular podcast in 2023 in the US charts. In 2025, Apple TV+ released Unicorn Girl, an Apple Original podcast created and hosted by Webster, which tracked the rise and fall of social media influencer Candace Rivera.

In 2023, the New York Festivals Radio Awards awarded gold to Died and Survived in the category of 'Personal Lives Podcast' and bronze to Surviving El Chapo in the category of 'Serialized Podcast'.

=== Other activities ===
After her studies at university, Webster began modelling professionally and also worked as a magician's assistant, taking part in illusions such as being sawn in half. She hosted various Nike training club events for Nike Women to help inspire women and girls to take up sport and exercise.

She was a contestant on the Channel 4 reality TV show Fool Around With.

Webster has hosted the RCM obesity seminar, spoke at the Women's Aid 'real man' campaign dinner and at the London Football Coaches Association dinner.

In November 2014, Webster resigned as a patron of Sheffield United after Ched Evans was invited to train at the club.

== Personal life ==
=== Sports ===
Webster is a keen runner, triathlete, and boxer, training at the Lynn ABC, and has completed her level 2 Football Association coaching badge. She is a lifelong fan of Sheffield United.

She has run sixteen marathons, including the London, New York, Singapore and Houston Marathons. Her first attempt at a triathlon was at the London Triathlon where she not only competed but also presented at the same time (for Channel 4). In July 2015, she completed her first Ironman Triathlon in 15 hours, 8 minutes and 59 seconds. She completed the Staffordshire 70.3 Ironman five weeks before in June 2015 as preparation in 6 hours 20 minutes. In October 2019, Webster completed her third Ironman Triathlon (70.3) in Marrakesh, with a record of 7:34:20.

=== Charity work ===
Webster is known for her charity work, especially for causes related to domestic violence, mental health, and sports. She has been an ambassador for Women's Aid since 2010 and has spoken openly about her own experience of abuse. She has also supported various campaigns and initiatives to raise awareness and funds for mental health issues. In addition, she has participated in several sporting events and challenges to benefit different charities.

Webster was presented with a heroes award in Parliament for her work in increasing awareness of domestic abuse and raising funds for Women's Aid. She is part of the Ministry of Justice's victim's panel to advise ministers directly on how to improve the criminal justice system.

On June 12 2026 it was announced that Webster had been awarded an MBE 'For Services to Broadcasting and to Charity' in the King's Birthday Honours List.

==== Fund raising ====
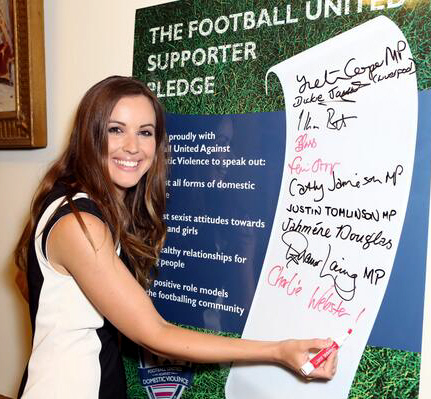
Webster in 2014 Supporting Women's Aid

In April 2009, Webster ran in the London Marathon raising money for the Bobby Moore Fund for Cancer Research UK. In April 2010, she ran the London Marathon again, raising money for the Women's Aid Federation of England.

In March 2010, she competed in the Macmillan 4x4 UK Challenge event in aid of Macmillan Cancer Support. She took an active role in the event, quickly learning the art of navigation and 4x4 driving, the event itself took place in the Mid to North Wales forests. The event raised £123,000 for Macmillan Cancer Support.

In 2014, Webster embarked on a 250 miles (400 km), seven day run between 40 football grounds for the charity which won her the 2014 Running Awards Runners' Challenge. In the same year, she also rode the three UK stages of the Tour de France in a Tour de Force group, raising money for the William Wates Memorial Trust for disadvantaged young people.

==== Malaria ====
After almost losing her life from Malaria, she is now working in the global fight to eradicate it. She travelled to Uganda and spent time in a high endemic malaria community making a film in conjunction with the Commonwealth Malaria campaign Malaria Must Die. She launched a Mass Action Against Malaria initiative with President Museveni delivering the keynote speech in the Uganda Parliament in Kampala.

=== Victim of abuse ===
Webster has spoken out about the domestic abuse she suffered at the hands of her stepfather. She was seven years old when the abuse began, and it continued for many years. Her stepfather would verbally and physically abuse her, and he also controlled her mother's life. Webster said that the abuse made her feel "worthless" and "like I didn't exist." She also said that it had a profound effect on her mental health. She has appeared on BBC's This Week discussing domestic abuse.

On 15 January 2014, in interview with BBC Radio 5 Live's Phil Williams, she revealed that aged 15 she had been groomed and sexually abused by her running coach. The man was later sentenced to 10 years in jail and put on the sex offender registry, after another younger girl recorded the abuse and contacted police. Choosing to waive her right to anonymity to go public with the revelations to "break the taboo about abuse as a whole". Webster stated:

I got quite close to the running coach because you do. He abused my trust and abused the fact that I was an innocent person that maybe wanted his support, his compassion and his care as my running coach.

=== Illness ===
In 2016, she embarked on a 3,000-mile bike ride from London to Rio de Janeiro, Brazil, to raise money for the Jane Tomlinson Appeal. The ride was challenging and exhausting, but she completed it successfully and arrived in Rio just in time for the Olympic opening ceremony. However, her joy was short-lived as she soon fell ill with a rare and severe form of malaria that she had contracted during the bike ride. She was rushed to a hospital in Rio, where she was put into a medically induced coma and was put on life support. Her condition was critical and she was given only 24 hours to live.

Against all odds, she survived the ordeal and woke up from the coma after two weeks. She had to undergo multiple blood transfusions and dialysis to recover from the damage caused by the infection. She also suffered from post-traumatic stress disorder and memory loss as a result of her near-death experience. She spent six weeks in hospital before she was able to return to the UK.

She has since become an advocate for malaria prevention and awareness, and has visited Uganda with the charity Malaria No More to see the impact of the disease first-hand. She has also resumed her cycling and broadcasting career, and has shared her story through the podcast, Died and Survived.
