= Sunita Shroff =

British television presenter and actress

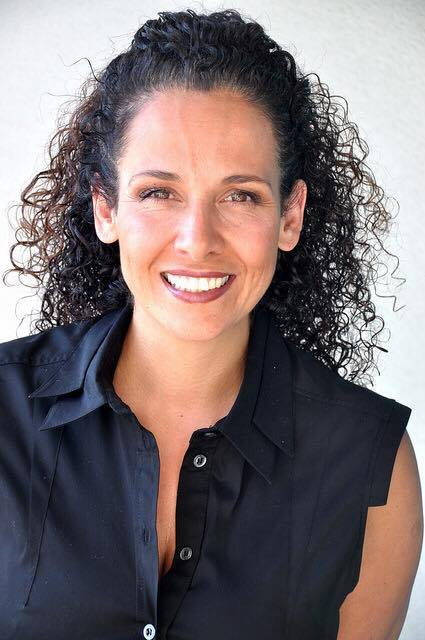
- Born: Scotland, UK
- Education: Campion School, Greece
- Occupations: Property expert, TV presenter and Actress.
- Employer(s): BBC, ITV, Sky Digital (UK & Ireland)
- Known for: TV presenting and acting
- Height: 5 ft 3 in (1.60 m)
- Website: www.sunitashroff.com

Sunita Shroff is a British television presenter and actress.

== Early life ==
Sunita Shroff was born on 22 March 1971 in Scotland to Irish and Indian parents, and raised in Greece where she was educated in the Campion School. She speaks fluent Greek, Italian and French.

== Career ==
Her TV career started at Channel East where she fronted their flagship current affairs show. Shroff went on to compete against 11,000 other people in the BBC Talent Competition and came in the final 3 in the 'Holiday Program' category.

Shroff gained presenting experience on the QVC shopping channel and has gone on to work as a presenter on a variety of terrestrial television projects, predominantly relating to the property market. She has also pursued an acting career, appearing in a number of television serials, commercials and in films.

=== Presenting credits ===
- Secret Location
- House Swap – BBC1
- Homes & Property – ITV1
- Get a new life – BBC2
- Moving Day – ITV1
- A house in the country – ITV1
- Women in the property market – Sky Digital (UK & Ireland)
- Upfront – BBC
- QVC – Sky Digital (UK & Ireland)
- Channel East – Sky Digital (UK & Ireland)
- Cook and Chat – Sky Digital (UK & Ireland)
- Lifestyle – Sky Digital (UK & Ireland)
- Live Mozambique 8 hour Telethon – Sky Digital (UK & Ireland)
- Viewing for leisure – Travel Series in Greece – Sky Digital (UK & Ireland)
- Great big British quiz – Sky Digital (UK & Ireland)
- BBC talent (Final 3 in 'Holiday' program category) – BBC

=== Acting credits – TV ===
- Coronation Street – Granada Television
- The Bill – ITV
- Emmerdale – ITV
- Gunrush – ITV
- Broken News – BBC
- Spookes – Lot 49 Films
- Strike Back: Project Dawn

=== Acting credits – film ===
- Fair is Fare
- Man Walks into a Pub
- Being Lucky
- Privacy
- How to Squat, a Guide
- Person to Persian
- Paid Arrogance
- Hallowed Ground
- The Odd Conversation

== Personal life ==
Child = Mimi Hedderly

== Charity work ==
In 2006, she competed in the Macmillan 4x4 UK Challenge charity event raising £2,000 for Macmillan Cancer Support.
