= British Isles – A Natural History =

2004 British television documentary series

- The British Isles DVD cover
- Genre: Nature documentary
- Presented by: Alan Titchmarsh
- Country of origin: United Kingdom
- Original language: English
- No. of series: 1
- No. of episodes: 8

Production
- Running time: 60 minutes
- Production company: BBC Natural History Unit

Original release
- Network: BBC One
- Release: 29 September – 24 November 2004

British Isles – A Natural History is an eight-part documentary series produced by the BBC Natural History Unit and presented by Alan Titchmarsh. Originally broadcast in the UK on BBC One from September to November 2004, it took viewers on a journey from the formation of what is now the British Isles some 3 billion years ago to the present day, revealing how natural and human forces have shaped the landscape. Each of the 50-minute episodes was followed by a 10-minute short specific to each region of the British Isles. In 2007, the BBC made a companion series about British wildlife called The Nature of Britain, also presented by Titchmarsh.

A 3-disc Region 2 and 4 DVD set (BBCDVD1506) featuring all eight episodes was released on 29 November 2004. Titchmarsh wrote an accompanying book, also called British Isles: A Natural History, and released by BBC Books on 1 October 2004. (ISBN 0-563-52162-7)

== Filming ==
On 30 May 2003 while filming near the Sycamore Gap Tree, the helicopter crashed around 30 metres (98 ft) away, narrowly avoiding presenter Alan Titchmarsh. The four on board the aircraft were lightly injured.
