= The Nature of Britain =

2007 British television documentary series

- DVD cover
- Genre: Nature documentary
- Country of origin: United Kingdom
- Original language: English

Production
- Production company: BBC Natural History Unit

Original release
- Release: October 2007 – November 2007

The Nature of Britain is a nature documentary series made for British television by the BBC Natural History Unit. It was first broadcast on BBC1 in October and November 2007. The Nature of Britain was the second BBC natural history series presented by Alan Titchmarsh, following 2004's British Isles – A Natural History.

After the introductory episode, each 50-minute programme showed the wild plants and animals found in a range of different British habitats. They were followed by a 10-minute regional programme which aimed to show viewers how they could contribute to wildlife conservation in their region.

== Episodes ==
- "Island Britain"
- "Farmland Britain"
- "Urban Britain"
- "Freshwater Britain"
- "Coastal Britain"
- "Woodland Britain"
- "Wilderness Britain"
- "Secret Britain"

== Merchandise ==
A 3-disc Region 2 DVD set (BBCDVD2532) featuring all eight episodes was released on 26 November 2007. Titchmarsh wrote an accompanying book, also called The Nature of Britain, and released by BBC Books on 27 September 2007. (ISBN 0-563-49398-4)
