= Martin Kellaway =

English cricketer (born 1970)

Martin Jon Kellaway (born 12 August 1970 in Southampton, Hampshire, England) is a former cricketer, who spent three seasons playing for the Hampshire Second XI, and one season for Somerset Second XI. He has also played for the Yorkshire Cricket Board. Kellaway was a wicket-keeper and a middle-order batsman.

He is a former pupil at The Mountbatten School And Language College in Romsey, Hampshire.
