= Charlie Dimmock =

English gardening expert and television presenter

- Born: Charlotte Elouise Dimmock; 10 August 1966 (age 60); West Wellow, Hampshire, England
- Education: The Mountbatten School; Cannington Horticultural college
- Occupations: Gardening expert; TV presenter
- Employers: Mill Water Gardens; BBC; ITV; CBS

Charlotte Elouise Dimmock (born 10 August 1966) is an English gardening expert and television presenter. She was a member of the team on Ground Force, a BBC gardening makeover programme, airing from 1997 to 2005.

Since then, Dimmock has presented numerous TV shows in the UK and US, including The Joy of Gardening, Charlie's Garden Army and most recently Garden Rescue.

== Early life and education ==
Dimmock attended Wellow Primary School and the Mountbatten School in Romsey, Hampshire. Her father Terry was a merchant seaman, and her mother Sue ran her own clothes shop.

Dimmock's love of gardening began at an early age – she enjoyed spending time in the garden as a child (gravitating towards the family pond) and helping her grandfather in his vegetable patch. At junior school, she had gardening lessons throughout the spring and summer terms. As a teenager, Dimmock had a weekend and holiday job at a local garden centre called Mill Water Gardens in Romsey, managed by Tim Bath of Romsey.

When she was at school, Dimmock initially planned to specialise in forensic science, but changed her mind and studied horticulture. Dimmock trained as an amenity horticulturalist at Winchester and in Somerset, graduating with a BTEC Diploma in Amenity Horticulture, attaining a distinction, and a National Technical Certificate in Turf Culture and Sporting Management. She spent a year of this training at the Chelsea Physic Garden in London.

After college, Dimmock joined Romsey Garden Centre. It was here that she met TV producer John Thornicroft, who later produced Ground Force.

== Television career ==
Dimmock first came to the public's attention in 1997, when she joined the BBC gardening series Ground Force, five years after first meeting the producer/director of the series when she built a pond for the Meridian series, Grass Roots. Dimmock co-presented Ground Force for the eight years it aired.

Since then, Dimmock has presented such programmes as The Joy of Gardening and Charlie's Garden Army, as well as presenting coverage of the Chelsea Flower Show. In 2004, she appeared in the Channel 4 reality TV show, The Games. She has also appeared on American television, presenting a gardening slot on The Early Show on CBS. In September 2006, she appeared on the BBC's Celebrity MasterChef.

Dimmock made a cameo appearance as herself in the British soap opera Hollyoaks in August 2002, acting as a special guest booked by character Gordon Cunningham to unveil the "Jubilee Gardens".

During the mid-2000s, after Ground Force had ceased production, she presented a local ITV Meridian series entitled River Walks, in which she walked along various rivers in Southern England, visiting landmarks and attractions along the way as well as meeting people who live and work on the rivers.

Dimmock was President of the Television and Radio Industries Club (TRIC) from 2003 to 2004 and presented their annual awards ceremony that year. In 2011, she joined the team of experts on ITV's Daybreak breakfast magazine show acting as gardening expert. In 2013, she presented an episode of The Great British Garden Revival.

In July 2016, Dimmock became a member of the team presenting Garden Rescue, a series on garden transformations produced for the BBC by Spun Gold TV.

== Other projects ==
Dimmock has written several gardening books, including the BBC Ground Force books Water Garden Workbook and Container Gardening, as well as Enjoy Your Garden, a book on general gardening published in 2000. Dimmock wrote a weekly gardening column in the Mail on Sunday for many years, until January 2008.

Dimmock appeared in pantomime over Christmas 2011 at The Spa in Bridlington playing the Organic Fairy in Jack and the Beanstalk: she reprised the role in December 2012 at the Pomegranate Theatre in Chesterfield.

Dimmock launched her In the Garden range of gardening equipment with the retail chain Poundland on 29 February 2016. She expanded her range in 2017.

Multiple flowers have been named after Charlie Dimmock, including the apricot orange Dahlia 'Charlie Dimmock' and cherry red/silvery pink Charlie's Rose.

== Personal life ==
Dimmock's mother Sue Kennedy, 59, and her stepfather Rob, 58, both died in the 2004 tsunami caused by an Indian Ocean earthquake while they were holidaying in Phuket, Thailand.

== Charity work ==
In 2003, Dimmock competed in the Macmillan 4x4 UK Challenge charity event, raising the profile of the event considerably, which has gone on to raise over £100,000 each year for Macmillan Cancer Support.

Dimmock has also been involved in many other charity works, such as Dreamflight, a charity organisation backed by British Airways for children with serious illnesses, that takes them to Florida, United States, for a "holiday of a lifetime".

== Bibliography ==
- Charlie Dimmock, "Ground Force" Water Garden Workbook, 1999, (ISBN 0563551135)
- Dimmock, Charlie (2000). Enjoy Your Garden: Gardening For Everyone. ISBN 0718144295.
- Charlie Dimmock, Water Garden Workbook, 2000, (ISBN 1856136582)
- Dimmock, Charlie (2001). Charlie's Enjoy Your Garden. ISBN 0140290419.
- Dimmock, Charlie (2002). "Ground Force": Container Gardening. ISBN 0563488093.
