= Rea (name) =

Rea (sometimes spelt Reah) is a name. Notable people and characters with the name include:

== Surname ==
- Alexander Rea (1858–1924), British archaeologist in India
- Alexander Rea (organist) (1830–1909), English clergyman and Australian musician
- Andrew Rea (born 1987), American culinary YouTube personality and filmmaker
- Baron Rea, a peerage of the United Kingdom

- Walter Russell Rea, 1st Baron Rea (1873–1948)
- Philip Russell Rea, 2nd Baron Rea (1900–1981)
- (John) Nicolas Rea, 3rd Baron Rea (1928–2020)

- Bradley Rea (born 1998), English professional boxer
- Carleton Rea (1861–1946), British mycologist
- Chris Rea (1951–2025), British rock and blues singer-songwriter and guitarist
- Chris Rea (rugby union) (born 1943), Scottish rugby union player
- Christopher G. Rea (born 1977), literary and cultural historian and academic
- Colin Rea (born 1990), American professional baseball pitcher
- Emma Amy Rea (1865–1927), British mycologist
- Flick Rea (1938–2026), English Liberal Democrat politician
- Florence P. Rea (1878–1924), American composer
- George Rea (1894–1978), American banker and university president
- Gino Rea (born 1989), British motorcycle racer
- Herald Rea Cox (H. R. Cox) (1907–1986), American bacteriologist
- Jackie Rea (1921–2013), Northern Irish snooker player
- James F. Rea (1937–2024), American politician
- James Rea Benson (1807–1885), Canadian businessman and politician from Ontario
- Joe Rea (curling) (born 1958), Canadian curler and coach
- John Rea (disambiguation), several people

- John Rea (artistic director) (born 1967), American composer and artistic director
- John Rea (composer) (born 1944), Canadian classical music composer
- John Rea (footballer) (1868–1944), Welsh footballer
- John Rea (horticulturalist) (died 1681), English garden writer
- John Rea (musician), Irish hammered dulcimer player
- John Rea (papyrologist) (1933–2023), British papyrologist and academic
- John Rea (politician) (1755–1829), United States politician
- John Rea (snooker player) (born 1951), Scottish snooker player
- John Andrew Rea (1848–1941), American journalist and politician
- John Huntington Rea (1909–1968), American actor, stage name John Ridgely
- John Patterson Rea (1840–1900), Minnesota judge

- Johnny Rea, motorcycle racer
- Jonathan Rea (born 1987), Northern Irish motorcycle racer
- Neill Rea (born 1971), New Zealand actor
- Paul Rea (born 1968), American radio and television reporter from Georgia
- Peggy Rea (1921–2011), American actress
- Russell Rea (1846–1916), British ship-owner and politician
- Samuel Rea (1855–1929), American railroad executive
- Sean Rea (born 2002), Canadian soccer player
- Silvia Dimitrova Rea (born 1970), Bulgarian painter
- Stephen Rea (born 1946), Irish actor
- Steven Rea, American film critic
- Thomas Rea (1929–2016), American dermatologist
- Tony Rea (born 1966), Australian rugby league coach
- Virginia Rea, American singer
- William Rea (ironmaster) (1662–1750?), partner or manager of English ironworks
- William Rea (real estate magnate) (1912–2006), of Pittsburgh, Pennsylvania

== Given name ==
=== Rea ===
- Rea Brändle (1953–2019), Swiss journalist
- Rea Carey (born 1966), American human rights activist
- Rea Garvey (born 1973), Irish singer
- Rea Hraski (born 1992), Croatian sportswoman
- Rea Irvin (1881–1972), American graphic artist
- Rea Leakey (1915–1999), British officer
- Rea Lenders (born 1980), Dutch trampoline gymnast
- Rea Lest-Liik (born 1990), Estonian actress
- Rea Mauranen (born 1949), Finnish television actress
- Rea Mészáros (born 1994), Hungarian handball player
- Rea Pittman (born 1993), Australian rugby league footballer
- Rea Ann Silva (born 1961), American creator
- Rea Tajiri (born 1958), Japanese–American filmmaker
- Rea Wilmshurst (1941–1996), Canadian literary editor

=== Reah ===
- Reah Whitehead (1883–1972), one of the first female lawyers in Washington state

== Single name ==
- Rea', a.k.a. Australian rapper Reason
- r e a (artist) (born 1962), Aboriginal Australian artist

== Fictional characters ==
- Princess Rea, in Friedrich Dürrenmatt's 1950 play Romulus der Große ("Romulus the Great")
- Rea Masaki (正木 玲亜, Masaki Reia), in the Tenchi Muyo! series and only a character in the OVA continuity
- T'Rea, a Vulcan priestess on Star Trek, mother of Sybok
- Rhea Silvia (also written as Rea Silvia), and also known as Ilia), the mythical mother of the twins Romulus and Remus, said to have founded the city of Rome
