= John Rea =

John Rea may refer to:

- John Rea (horticulturalist) (died 1681), English garden writer
- John Rea (politician) (1755–1829), United States politician
- John Rea (Florida politician), an early mayor of Tallahassee, Florida
- John Patterson Rea (1840–1900), Minnesota judge
- John Andrew Rea (1848–1941), American journalist and politician
- John Huntington Rea (1909–1968), American actor better known by the stage name John Ridgely
- John Joseph Rea (1921–2013), Northern Irish snooker player, better known as Jackie Rea
- John Rea (papyrologist) (1933–2023), British papyrologist and academic
- John Rea (composer) (born 1944), Canadian classical music composer
- John Rea (snooker player) (born 1951), Scottish snooker player
- John Rea (musician), Irish hammered dulcimer player
- John Rea (artistic director) (born 1967), American composer and artistic director
- John Rea (footballer) (1868–1944), Welsh footballer
- Johnny Rea, motorcycle racer
