= London Welsh F.C. =

London Welsh Football Club is an amateur men's football team that plays in the Amateur Football Combination in London. The club is one of the oldest football clubs in London having played its first match on 17 October 1890.

== History ==
The club was founded on Saturday 16 August 1890 at a meeting at the Old Rodney Head, Old Street.

There had been several attempts in the preceding years to establish a Welsh football club in the capital, and matches had been played on an informal basis with a degree of success. A number of Welsh players had been playing for other prominent London clubs, and several of them committed to play for the new London Welsh club.

A general meeting of the newly formed club was held at the Salutation Tavern on Newgate Street on Thursday 28 August 1890 at which Sir John Puleston MP was appointed as president. Evan Owen (Caernarfon) was elected chairman, T. J Williams (Bangor) became the first club secretary, John Charles Rae was the match secretary, and G Symonds was treasurer. Lord Penrhyn and Dr Isambard Owen were amongst the club's first patrons.

The first full season (1891–92) was a difficult one, including an emphatic 0–12 loss to Millwall Athletic. They played in the London League in the 1896–97 season, in which they finished bottom. They were suspended towards the end of the season, and the points from their two remaining games went to their opponents, Thames Ironworks (who later changed their name to West Ham), who as a result finished second. At this time the club had 90 members who were all, exclusively, Welsh.

== Connections with the London Welsh RFC ==
In 1895 London Welsh FC played a significant part in the history of the London Welsh Rugby Club. The original rugby club, which had been established in 1885, had disbanded by the end of the 1894-95 season. In March 1895, the London Welsh FC committee decided to start a rugby section for the following season and, during the 1895-96 season, the football and rugby sections of the club shared the same ground at Tufnell Park.

At the AGM at the Orange Tree in July 1898, the club's financial losses were due entirely to the rugby section and, as a result it was resolved to run the football and rugby sections separately in future. Shortly afterwards the pendulum began to swing for the rugby club when the Welsh Rugby Union made a grant of £50, accepted the nominations of two London Welsh representatives on the WRU committee, and urged all Welsh players in London and up at the universities to join the club (with the inducement that in future preference would be given to the London Welsh players for international trials).

== Notable players ==
A number of London Welsh FC's players have played for the Wales national football team:

- Centre half Price White played for the club from 1892 to 1896 and was capped in 1896
- Goalkeeper Sam Gillam played for the club from 1890 to 1893 and was capped five times between 1889 and 1894
- Striker Robert Lee Roberts played for the club from 1891 to 1902 and was capped in 1890
- Left midfielder John Rea (footballer) was one of the founder members of the club and was capped nine times by Wales between 1894 and 1898
- Goalkeeper Leigh Richmond Roose played for the club between 1900–01, was capped three times while playing for the club, and went on to keep goal for a long list of professional clubs including Stoke, Everton, Sunderland, Aston Villa, Celtic and Arsenal
- Winger Samuel Brookes played for the club in 1897 and was capped twice in 1900

== Honours ==
The club has won the following honours:

- Middlesex Senior Cup runners up (1st XI) in 1894–95
- Southern Olympian Senior Division 1 winners (1st XI) in 1922–23
- Southern Olympian Minor Division 3 winners (3rd XI) in 1951–52
- Southern Olympian Senior Division 3 winners (1st XI) in 1953–54
- Southern Olympian Senior Division 3 winners (1st XI) in 1968–69
- Southern Olympian Senior Division 3 winners (1st XI) in 1973–74
- Southern Olympian Minor Division E winners (3rd XI) in 1979–80
- Southern Olympian Senior Division 4 winners (1st XI) in 1993–94
- Southern Olympian Minor Division C winners (3rd XI) in 1993–94
- Amateur Football Combination Division 3 South Winners (1st XI) in 2015–16
- LOB Challenge Cup Winners (1st XI) in 2016–17
- Amateur Football Combination Division 1 South Winners (1st XI) in 2016–17

== Present day club ==
London Welsh FC currently run two football teams, who compete in the Amateur Football Combination. The club plays its home games at Riverside Lands (Chiswick) and Gunnersbury Park.
