= Sam Gilbert =

Sam Gilbert may refer to:

- Sam Gilbert (Australian footballer) (born 1986), Australian rules footballer
- Sam Gilbert (businessman) (1913–1987), American businessman and UCLA Athletic promoter
- Sam Gilbert (rugby union) (born 1999), New Zealand rugby union player

== See also ==
- Samuel Gilbert (died 1692), English cleric and writer on floriculture
- Sam G. Bratton (Samuel Gilbert Bratton, 1888–1963), American senator and judge
