= Thomas Orde Lawder Wilkinson =

Recipient of the Victoria Cross

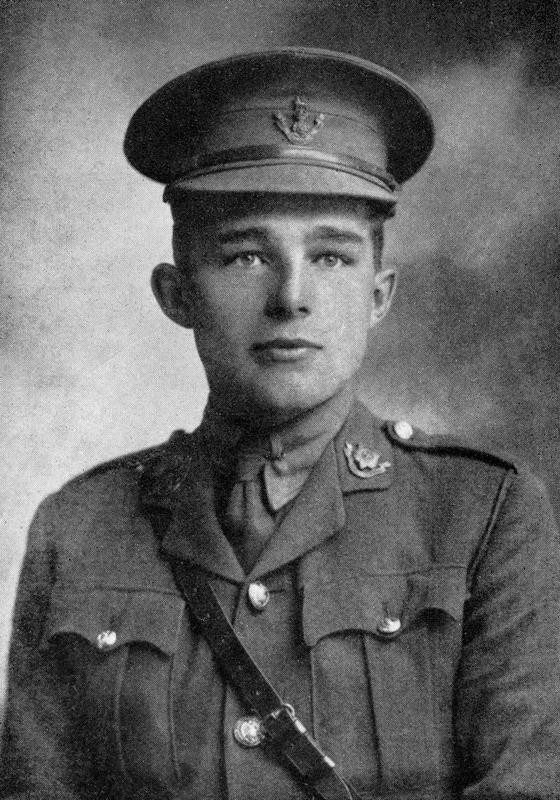
- Thomas Orde Wilkinson, VC
- Born: 29 June 1894; Bridgnorth, England
- Died: 5 July 1916 (aged 22); La Boiselle, France
- Burial place: No known grave
- Military career
- Allegiance: Canada; United Kingdom
- Branch: Canadian Expeditionary Force; British Army
- Service years: 1914–1916
- Rank: Lieutenant
- Units: 16th Battalion (Canadian Scottish); 7th Battalion, Loyal North Lancashire Regiment
- Conflicts: First World War: Western Front; Battle of the Somme; Battle of Albert; Capture of La Boisselle †
- Awards: Victoria Cross

Thomas Orde Lawder Wilkinson VC (29 June 1894 – 5 July 1916) was an English-born Canadian and British Army officer who was a recipient of the Victoria Cross (VC), the highest and most prestigious award for gallantry in the face of the enemy that can be awarded to British and Commonwealth forces, making him Canada's nineteenth recipient. A soldier with the Loyal North Lancashire Regiment during the First World War, he was posthumously awarded the VC for his actions on 5 July 1916, during the Battle of the Somme.

== Early life ==
Wilkinson was born on 29 June 1894, the second son of Charles Orde Wilkinson and his wife, Edith, at Lodge Farm on Dudmaston estate near Bridgnorth in Shropshire, England. He attended Parkside School, Cobham, in Surrey and then Wellington College where he showed both academic and athletic prowess. He graduated in November 1912 and then joined his family in Vancouver in British Columbia, Canada, where they had emigrated. His father had been working there at the time of Wilkinson's birth.

== First World War ==
Shortly after the outbreak of the First World War, Wilkinson joined the 16th Battalion (Canadian Scottish) at Vancouver. He had been working as a surveyor at the time of his enlistment. He was soon commissioned as a lieutenant. After the regiment arrived in England he transferred to the 7th Battalion, Loyal North Lancashire Regiment and by the start of 1916 was serving on the Western Front as a gunnery officer.

Wilkson's battalion was part of the 56th Infantry Brigade, 19th Division, which was involved in the opening stages of the Battle of the Somme. During the battle, on 4 July 1916, his battalion was attacking the village of La Boisselle. A neighbouring unit had conceded ground and Wilkinson's battalion was ordered to retake the position. A machine-gun had been left behind, which Wilkinson put into operation on reaching the position. He was able to hold off an attacking party of Germans until reinforcements arrived. He was killed shortly afterwards trying to bring a wounded soldier into cover. For his actions, he was posthumously awarded the Victoria Cross (VC). The VC, instituted in 1856, was the highest award for valour that could be bestowed on a soldier of the British Empire. The citation for Wilkinson's VC read:

For most conspicuous bravery. During an attack, when a party of another unit was retiring without their machine-gun, Lieut. Wilkinson rushed forward, and, with two of his men, got the gun into action, and held up the enemy till they were relieved. Later, when the advance was checked during a bombing attack, he forced his way forward and found four or five men of different units stopped by a solid block of earth, over which the enemy was throwing bombs. With great pluck and promptness he mounted a machine-gun on the top of the parapet and dispersed the enemy bombers. Subsequently he made two most gallant attempts to bring in a wounded man, but at the second attempt he was shot through the heart just before reaching the man. Throughout the day he set a magnificent example of courage and self-sacrifice.

— London Gazette, 26 September 1916

As his body was never recovered, Wilkinson is commemorated with thousands of other British and Commonwealth soldiers on the British Memorial to the Missing at Thiepval. His name is also on the Sandwick War Memorial, in British Columbia. In 2004 a plaque to his memory was unveiled at the church in Quatt, near his place of birth. The plaque was commissioned by the Shropshire War Memorials Association after unsuccessful attempts to locate relatives of Wilkinson.

== Victoria Cross ==
King George V presented Wilkinson's VC to his father on 26 November 1916, in a ceremony at Buckingham Palace. He was also entitled to the 1914–15 Star, the British War Medal, and the Victory Medal. His VC and other medals are displayed at the Imperial War Museum in London.
