= Quatt =

Coordinates: 52.491°N 2.361°W

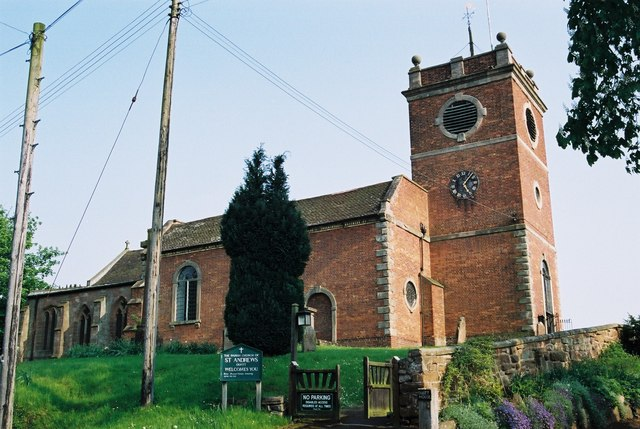
- St Andrew's church, Quatt, Shropshire

- Location within Shropshire
- Population: 200 (2011)
- OS grid reference: SO754882
- Civil parish: Quatt Malvern
- Unitary authority: Shropshire
- Ceremonial county: Shropshire
- Region: West Midlands
- Country: England
- Sovereign state: United Kingdom
- Post town: BRIDGNORTH
- Postcode district: WV15
- Dialling code: 01746
- Police: West Mercia
- Fire: Shropshire
- Ambulance: West Midlands
- UK Parliament: Ludlow

Quatt is a small village in Shropshire, England in the Severn Valley. The civil parish, formally known as Quatt Malvern, has a population of 219 according to the 2001 census, reducing to 200 at the 2011 census.

It lies on the A442 south of Bridgnorth.

There are places to visit like the Quatt Village Hall and activities to take part in, from the local Cricket Club to Bell Ringing. In 2017, Quatt Village Hall won the 'Most Welcoming Village Hall award'.

Dudmaston Hall is located in the parish.

== Notable people ==
- Charles Babbage, computing pioneer, married Georgiana Whitmore of Dudmaston and lived for significant periods at Dudmaston Hall himself, where he planned the house's central heating system.
- Samuel Gilbert, writer on horticulture, was rector here in the later 17th century.
- Sir George Labouchere, British diplomat and modern art collector, lived at Dudmaston Hall in retirement.
- Thomas Orde Lawder Wilkinson, posthumous Victoria Cross recipient in World War I was born at Lodge Farm on the Dudmaston estate and has a commemorative plaque at Quatt Church.
- William Wolryche Whitmore of Dudmaston Hall, Whig politician of the early 19th century, buried at Quatt
- David York, English cricketer played for Shropshire

== See also ==
- Listed buildings in Quatt Malvern
- Quatford
