= Robert Lee Roberts =

Welsh footballer

Personal information
- Full name: Robert Humphrey Lee Roberts
- Date of birth: 1868
- Place of birth: Beaumaris, Wales
- Date of death: 2 March 1943 (aged 74–75)
- Height: 5 ft 11 in (1.80 m)
- Position: Full back

Senior career*
| Years | Team | Apps | (Gls) |
| 1888–1891 | Chester | | |
| 1891–1902 | London Welsh | | |
| 1902 | Brentwood | | |

International career
| 1890 | Wales | 1 | (0) |
- * Club domestic league appearances and goals

Robert Humphrey Lee "Bob Lee" Roberts (1868 – 2 March 1943) was a Welsh footballer who played at full back for Chester in the 1880s and 1890s. He made one appearance for Wales.

== Football career ==
Roberts was born in Beaumaris on the island of Anglesey, but had joined Chester by 1888, where he became team captain. His only international appearance came on 8 February 1890 against Ireland at the Old Racecourse, Shrewsbury, when he was called up in the absence of Di Jones. The match ended in a 5–2 victory for the Welsh.

During Roberts' time at Chester, the club helped found The Combination in 1890, finishing in third place in the inaugural season.

In 1891, Roberts moved to London to take up employment with Shoolbreds, a large department store in Gower Street. He joined the newly formed London Welsh club shortly after his arrival in the capital, and was converted into a free-scoring centre forward. One report commented: "His play is remarkable for unnerving judgement, together with great speed... besides being a good dribbler, he is a fine shot at goal and keeps his team together well."

In 1892, his career was interrupted by a broken leg, but he made a full recovery enabling him to score seven goals in one match for Middlesex against United Hospitals in 1894.
