= Listed buildings in Quatt Malvern =

Quatt Malvern is a civil parish in Shropshire, England. It contains 15 listed buildings that are recorded in the National Heritage List for England. Of these, three are listed at Grade II*, the middle of the three grades, and the others are at Grade II, the lowest grade. The parish contains the village of Quatt and the surrounding countryside. In the parish is the country house, Dudmaston Hall, which is listed, together with associated structures. The other listing buildings include a church, farmhouses, houses and cottages, a vicarage, a war memorial, and a telephone kiosk.

== Key ==
| Grade | Criteria |
|---|---|
| II* | Particularly important buildings of more than special interest |
| II | Buildings of national importance and special interest |

== Buildings ==
| Name and location | Photograph | Date | Notes | Grade |
|---|---|---|---|---|
| St Andrew's Church; 52.49123°N 2.36048°W | | 12th century | The north arcade was built in the 15th century, much of the church is the result of rebuilding in 1763, and the north chapel was largely rebuilt in the 1950s. Most of the church is in red brick with quoins, the chancel is in stone, and the roofs are tiled. The church consists of a nave, a north aisle, a chancel, a northeast chapel, and a west tower. The tower has three stages, it contains a porch with a round-headed entrance, circular bell openings, a clock face on the north side, an eaves cornice, and a parapet with pinnacles and ball finials. The windows in the nave are round-headed, and in the chancel they are Decorated in style. | II* |
| Brookhouse Farm; 52.49873°N 2.34125°W | — | Late 14th century | The building originated as a cross-wing to a former open hall, with later extensions and alterations. The original part is timber framed on a sandstone plinth, the later parts are in brick, and the roof is tiled. The building has an L-shaped plan, consisting of a three-bay wing with two storeys and an attic, a single-bay two-storey wing, and a single-bay extension with one storey and an attic. | II |
| 37 Wooton; 52.49859°N 2.34223°W | — | 17th century | A timber framed cottage with plaster infill and a tile roof. There is one storey and an attic, a casement window and a gabled dormer. | II |
| Brook Cottage; 52.49871°N 2.34193°W | — | 17th century | A timber framed cottage with brick infill and a tile roof. There is one storey and an attic, two bays, and a later wing on the right with weatherboarding. The windows are casements, and there are two gabled dormers. | II |
| Dudmaston Hall; 52.49663°N 2.37540°W | | Late 17th century | A country house that was altered in the early 19th century. It is built in red brick with pink sandstone dressings, angle quoins, and a storey band. There are two storeys and attics, the east and west fronts have nine bays, the middle five bays slightly recessed and the outer bays pedimented, and the north front has seven bays. At the south end of the west front is a pavilion, and behind and beyond it are two service wings. The doorways have broken segmental pediments, and the windows are sashes with keystones and console brackets. | II* |
| Dower House; 52.49165°N 2.36090°W | — | Before 1718 | The house, in Queen Anne style, is built in red brick on a stone plinth with rusticated quoins, a moulded band, a modillion eaves cornice, and a hipped tile roof. There are two storeys and nine bays, the windows are sashes, and there are two dormers. On the front are two doorways, each with fluted Ionic columns, a fanlight, and a broken pediment with scrolls. | II* |
| 29 and 30 Quatt; 52.49158°N 2.36112°W | — | 18th century | A pair of red brick houses with tile roofs and two storeys. No. 29 on the left has four bays, and a projecting gabled wing on the left. The windows are casements with arched heads. No. 30 is taller, with two bays, casement windows, a band, and moulded stone eaves. | II |
| Mose Farm House; 52.50835°N 2.36146°W | — | 1775 | The farmhouse, which may have an earlier core, is in brick with a moulded eaves cornice, and a tiled roof with coped gables. There are three storeys and three bays. The windows are sashes with keyblocks. | II |
| Lodge Farm House; 52.49779°N 2.38440°W | — | Late 18th century | The farmhouse, which probably has a 17th-century core, is in painted brick with stone dressings and a moulded cornice. There are two storeys and an attic, and a front with three coped gables, two of them stepped. The windows are casements with keyblocks, those in the upper floor with semicircular heads. The doorway has a moulded surround with pilasters, a rectangular fanlight, and a shallow pediment. | II |
| North Lodge, Dudmaston Hall; 52.50152°N 2.37822°W | — | Early 19th century | The lodge is in sandstone with a tile roof. It has two storeys, a gabled timber porch, and gables with ornamental bargeboards. The windows are casements, and there is a canted bay window with a hipped roof. | II |
| Outbuildings, Dudmaston Hall; 52.49564°N 2.37428°W | | Early 19th century | The outbuildings surround a courtyard and incorporate earlier farm buildings, some timber framed with brick infill, and some in brick dated 1789. The 19th-century buildings are also in brick, with tiled roofs, dentilled eaves, windows and doorways with cambered heads, four gabled dormers, and a datestone. In the northeast corner is an entrance lodge with an archway, over which is a tower with an embattled parapet, an ogee roof, and a weathervane. | II |
| South Lodge, Dudmaston Hall; 52.49566°N 2.36793°W | | Early 19th century | The lodge is in sandstone with a tile roof. It has two storeys and a cruciform plan. The lodge has gabled wings with ornamental bargeboards and obelisk finials, a casement window with a hood mould, and an arched doorway with a gabled stone porch. | II |
| Vicarage; 52.49151°N 2.36159°W | — | Early 19th century | The vicarage is in painted brick with a slate roof. There are two storeys and three bays. The doorway has a moulded surround, pilasters, and a small cornice hood, and the windows are sashes, the window above the doorway in an arched recess. | II |
| War Memorial; 52.49137°N 2.36053°W | — | c. 1920 | The war memorial is in the churchyard of St Andrew's Church to the north of the church. It is in red sandstone, and consists of a cross with a tapered shaft on a plinth and a stepped platform. There is an inscription on the north face of the plinth. | II |
| Telephone kiosk 52.49140°N 2.36168°W | | 1935 | A K6 type telephone kiosk, designed by Giles Gilbert Scott. Constructed in cast iron with a square plan and a dome, it has three unperforated crowns in the top panels. | II |
