= David York =

English cricketer (born 1941)

David Leslie York (born 13 April 1941) is a former English cricketer. He was a right-handed batsman and right-arm medium-fast bowler who played for Shropshire. He was born in Quatt, Shropshire.

He was educated at Cheltenham College, Bridgnorth Grammar School, and St Paul's College of Education, Cheltenham.

York, who made his debut in the Minor Counties Championship in 1961, made his only List A appearance in the 1974 Gillette Cup, against Essex. From the tailend, he scored just a single run, as the team was all out for just 41 runs. York bowled 12 overs in the match, taking figures of 1-34.

He continued to represent Shropshire until 1976. He also played county cricket at Second XI level for Northamptonshire and Worcestershire County Cricket Clubs. He played club level cricket for Bridgnorth, Old Hill, Kidderminster and West Bromwich Dartmouth.

In 2013, he organised a reunion of the Shropshire side to mark the 40th anniversary of the county's first ever Minor Counties Championship title.
