= Samuel Gilbert =

The Reverend Samuel Gilbert
- Rector of Quatt
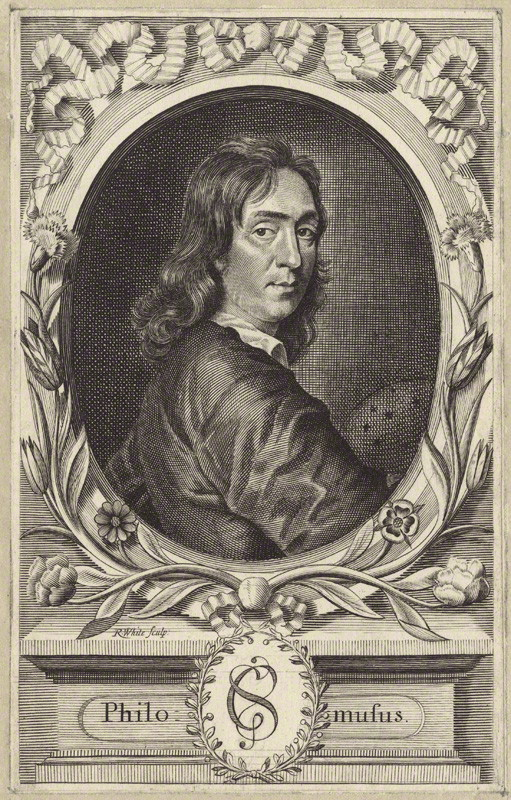
- Portrait by Robert White (1683)
- Diocese: Hereford

Personal details
- Died: c. 1692
- Denomination: Anglican
- Spouse: Minerva Rea (m.)

Samuel Gilbert (died c. 1692) was an English cleric, writer on horticulture, and floriculturist.

== Life ==
Gilbert was chaplain to Jane, wife of Charles Gerard, 4th Baron Gerard of Gerards Bromley, and rector of Quatt in Shropshire. He seems to have lived with his father-in-law John Rea, who died in 1681, at Kinlet, Shropshire, near Bewdley. The date of his death is uncertain.

== Works ==
In 1676 Gilbert published a pamphlet entitled Fons Sanitatis, or the Healing Spring at Willowbridge in Staffordshire, found out by … Lady Jane Gerard, London, pp. 40, some of the cures recorded in which work are attested by himself. It has therefore been suggested that he also practised as a physician.

After the death of Rea, in 1681, he also published the Florist's Vademecum and Gardener's Almanack, 1683, subsequent editions of which appeared in 1690, 1693, 1702, and 1713. The work is arranged according to the months, and to the second edition are added various appendices and a portrait of the author, engraved by Robert White, which was reproduced in the Journal of Horticulture.

Gilbert speaks of his father-in-law as the greatest of florists; and, as his own writings contain many verses, it has been suggested that he also composed those in Rea's Flora, Ceres, and Pomona, 1676.

== Family ==
Gilbert married Minerva, daughter of John Rea. They had one son, Arden, and four or five daughters.

== Bibliography ==
- Boulger, George Simonds (1890). "Gilbert, Samuel" . In Stephen, Leslie (ed.). Dictionary of National Biography. Vol. 21. London: Smith, Elder & Co. pp. 334–335.
