= George Labouchère =

British diplomat and collector of modern art

Labouchere in 1960

Sir George Peter Labouchere GBE KCMG FRSA (2 December 1905 in London – 14 June 1999 in Dudmaston Hall, Shropshire) was a British diplomat and collector of modern art.

== Career ==
Labouchere was educated at Charterhouse School and the Sorbonne, and entered the Diplomatic Service in 1929.

He was Deputy-Commissioner for Austria, 1951–53, Minister to Hungary 1953–55, Ambassador to Belgium 1955–60, and Ambassador to Spain 1960–66. He was a member of the Society of Dilettanti and was associated at various stages with the Tate Gallery, London, serving as president of the Friends of the Tate. He was an avid art collector, buying, at various stages, works by British artists including Henry Moore, Barbara Hepworth, Lynn Chadwick and Ben Nicholson. He also bought contemporary continental works, including Victor Vasarely, Antoni Tàpies, Pierre Soulages, Jean Dubuffet and Max Ernst.

== Family ==
Labouchere was a descendant of an old Huguenot merchant family exiled in the 17th century to England, which included prominent politicians such as Henry Labouchere, 1st Baron Taunton and Henry Du Pré Labouchere. His father was Lieutenant-Colonel Francis Anthony Labouchere, a banker and reserve officer, and his mother was Evelyn Stirling, only child of Sir Walter Stirling, 3rd Baronet of Faskine.

His sister Lilah married Ailwyn Fellowes, 3rd Baron de Ramsey, a first cousin (once removed) of Winston Churchill.

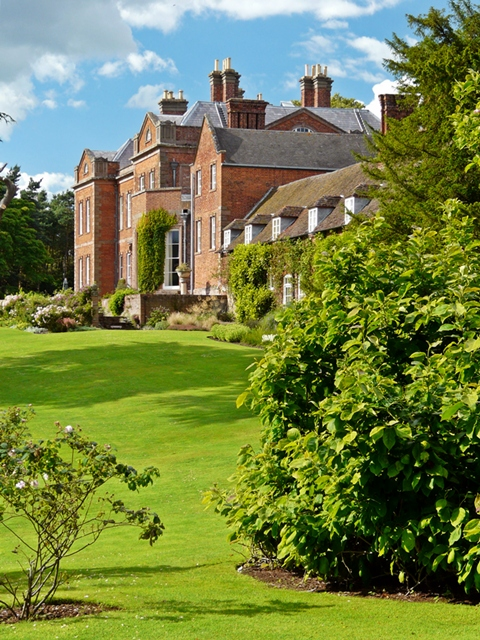
Dudmaston Hall

On 10 May 1943 he married Rachel Hamilton-Russell, granddaughter of the 8th Viscount Boyne. Dudmaston Hall, now run by the National Trust, was Rachel Hamilton-Russell's ancestral home, inherited from her maternal uncle Geoffrey Wolryche-Whitmore, and the couple settled there to restore it in their retirement. He was president of the Shropshire branch of the Council for the Protection of Rural England.

== Honours ==
Labouchere was appointed CMG in the 1951 New Year Honours, knighted KCMG in 1955 and given the additional, senior knighthood of GBE in the 1964 Birthday Honours.
