= Dudmaston Hall =

17th-century country house near Quatt, Shropshire, England

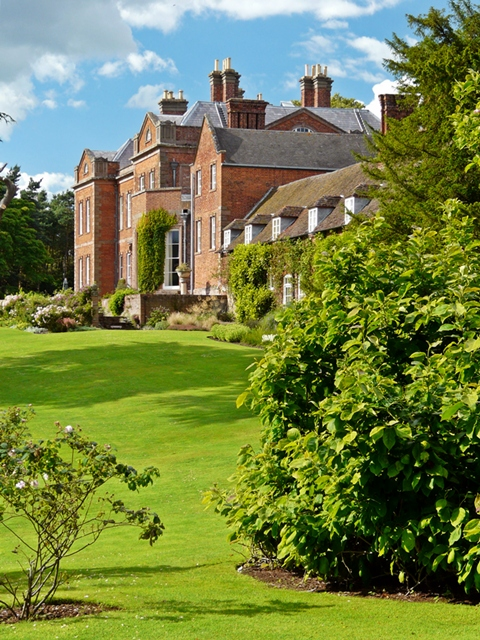
- Dudmaston Hall

- Location within Shropshire

General information
- Location: Severn Valley, Shropshire, England
- Coordinates: 52.4966°N 2.3753°W
- Completed: Late 17th century

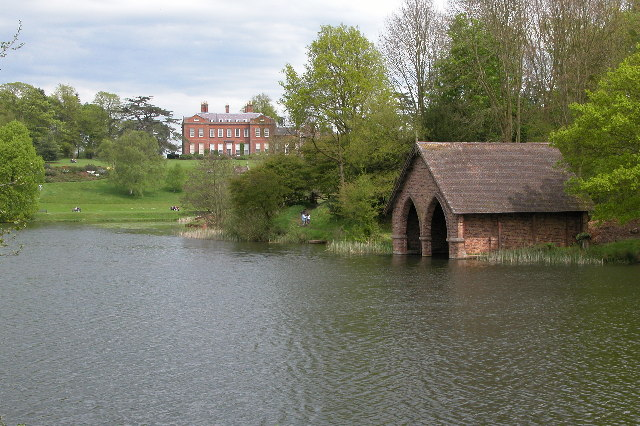
View of Dudmaston and boat house from the lake

Dudmaston Hall is a 17th-century country house in the care of the National Trust in the Severn Valley, Shropshire, England.

Dudmaston Hall is located near the village of Quatt, a few miles south of the market town of Bridgnorth, just off the A442 road.

== History ==
The property is a late 17th-century country mansion and an example of a traditional Shropshire country estate, in that it comprises the main hall, the landscaped gardens, parkland, managed woodlands, lakeside, farmland and the estate cottages, for example at Quatt, a model village designed by London architect John Birch in 1870 for the workers and tenants of the estate.

=== Wolryche connection ===
The Dudmaston estate has been in the Wolryche family and the barely related Wolryche-Whitmore family since 1403, when William Wolryche of nearby Much Wenlock acquired it by marriage to the heiress of the former owners, Margaret de Dudmaston. It is likely that the medieval house was replaced by a structure on the site of the present building in the 16th century. This is shown in a stylised way on old maps as a fortified manor house. It is likely that the main source of income was sheep raising, an important part of the late medieval economy, in which the wool trade played a central role. Unlike many of the Shropshire and Staffordshire gentry, the Wolryches accepted the Reformation and became stalwart Anglicans, but were royalists, as loyal to the House of Stuart as to their Tudor predecessors.

Francis Wolryche (1563–1614) was wealthy enough to have himself and his wife, Margaret Bromley, buried under elaborate effigies in Quatt church. Their son, Sir Thomas Wolryche, 1st Baronet (1598–1668), was the first of the Wolryche baronets – a dignity he achieved not by the usual route of purchase, but through his enthusiastic support for Charles I, who knighted him July 1641 and raised him to the baronetcy a few weeks later. On the outbreak of the English Civil War, he raised troops for the King and was appointed governor of Bridgnorth Castle. When Parliamentary forces arrived at Bridgnorth in 1646, Wolryche's garrison set fire to the town, which was largely destroyed, before retreating into the castle, only to surrender shortly afterwards. Sir Thomas Wolryche was fined £730 14s by Parliament and was one of the few royalists not to recover his money at the Restoration in 1660.

=== Construction of the present Hall ===
Sir Thomas's eldest son, Francis (1627–89), the second baronet, was declared a lunatic. It was his fifth son, John Wolryche, who took over the estate in 1668. He began building a new house at Quatt, now the dower house, but died in 1685, before work was finished.

John's son, Sir Thomas Wolryche (1672–1701) inherited his uncle's baronetcy and his father's determination to rebuild. However, he embarked on a much more ambitious project, replacing the old manor house with a new sandstone building, the core of the present Dudmaston Hall. The architect appears to have been Francis Smith of Warwick, who provided a substantial, well-built, but not grand residence. Modelled on Belton House in Lincolnshire, it has an H-plan lay-out, a large central entrance hall, backed by a saloon, and flanked by three-roomed wings. Construction probably began before 1700, but Thomas died in 1701 before it was complete.

Management of the estate passed to Sir Thomas's widow, Elizabeth Weld. However, their son, Sir John Wolryche (1691–1723), the fourth baronet, came to maturity in 1712 and took over the reins. For a decade he spent heavily on gambling, horses and hunting. In 1723, attempting to ford the Severn after attending races at Chelmarsh, directly opposite Dudmaston, he drowned, leaving no male heir. The estate was burdened by heavy debts and was passed to Sir John's sister, Mary, only on payment of £14,000. She, her mother Elizabeth, and her uncle, Colonel Thomas Weld, resided at Dudmaston, and over the next half century, largely restored it to a sound financial footing by frugal management.

The Wolryches

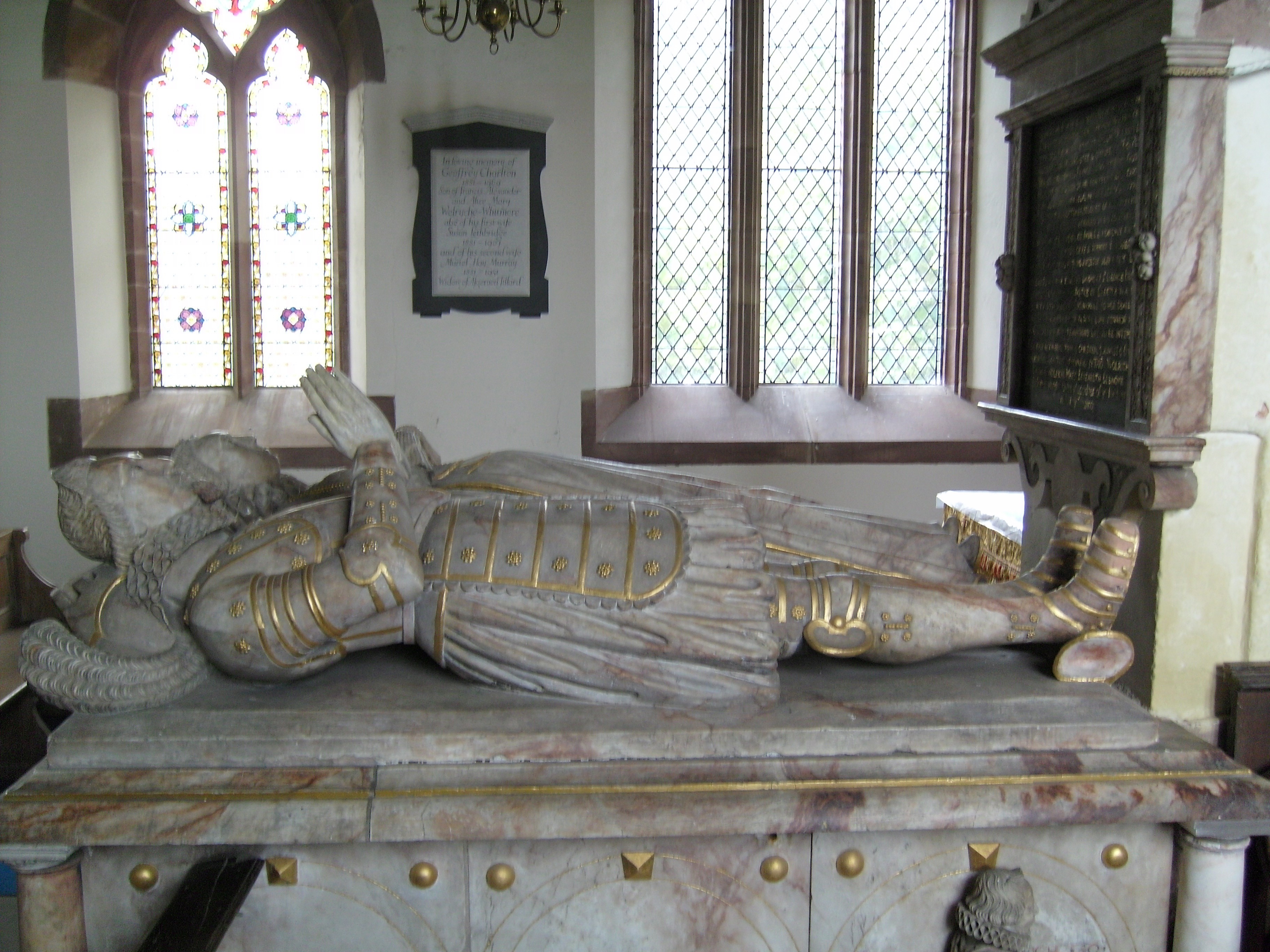
Tomb of Francis and Margaret Wolryche in St. Andrew's church, Quatt. They were the ancestors of all the Wolryche Baronets.

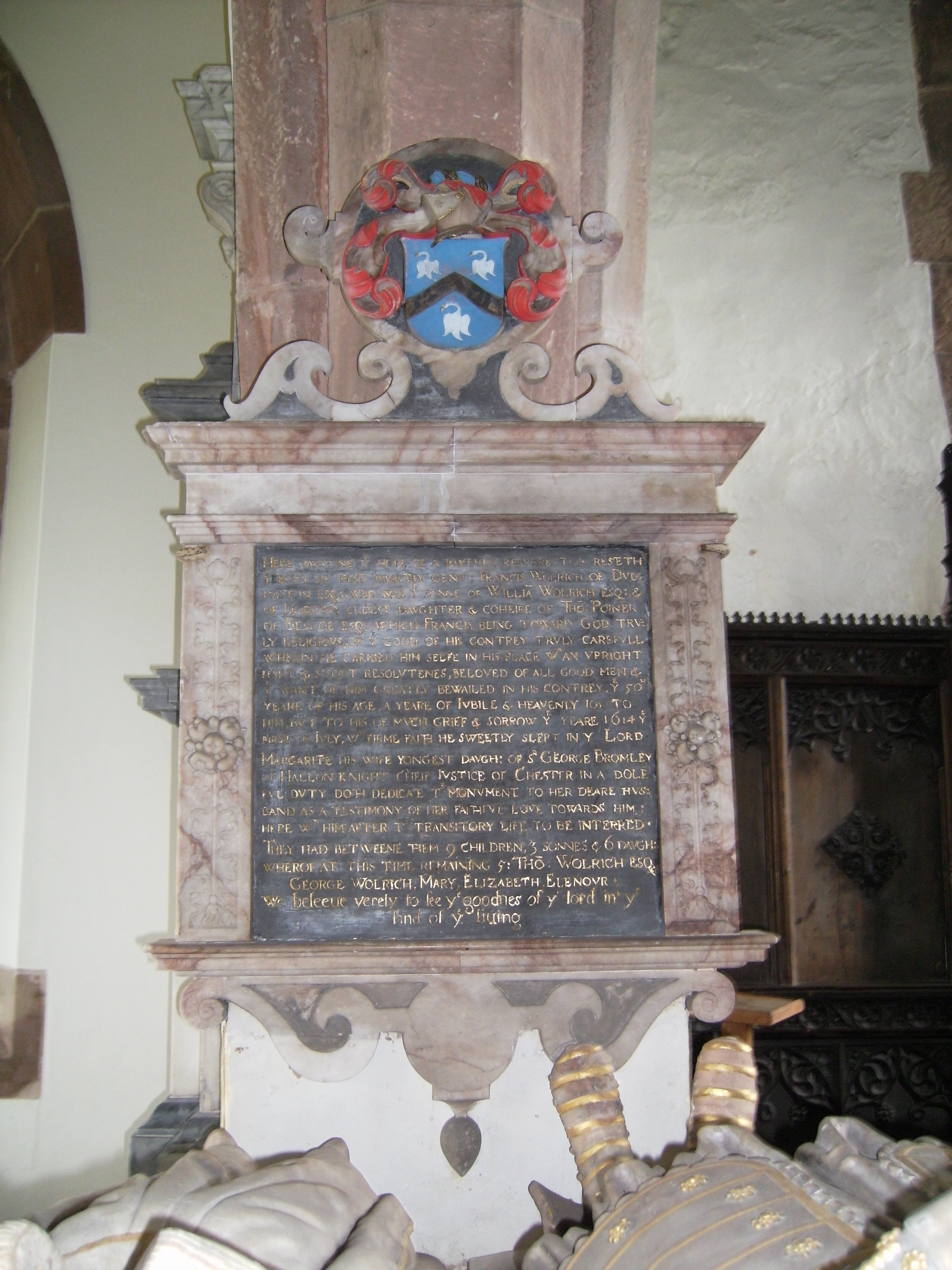
Margaret's memorial to Francis, installed after his death in 1614.

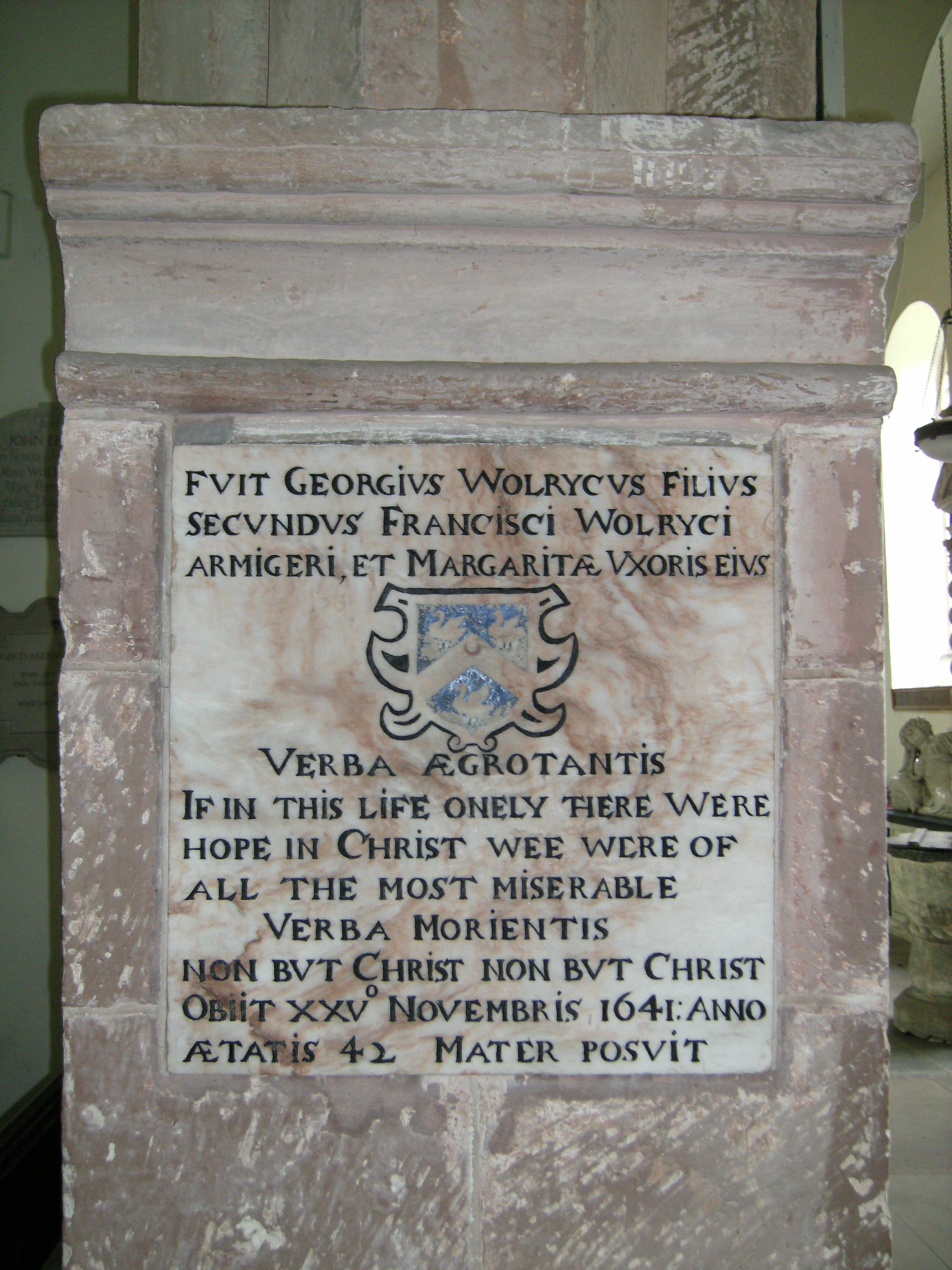
Memorial to George Wolryche, a younger brother of Sir Thomas, the first baronet.

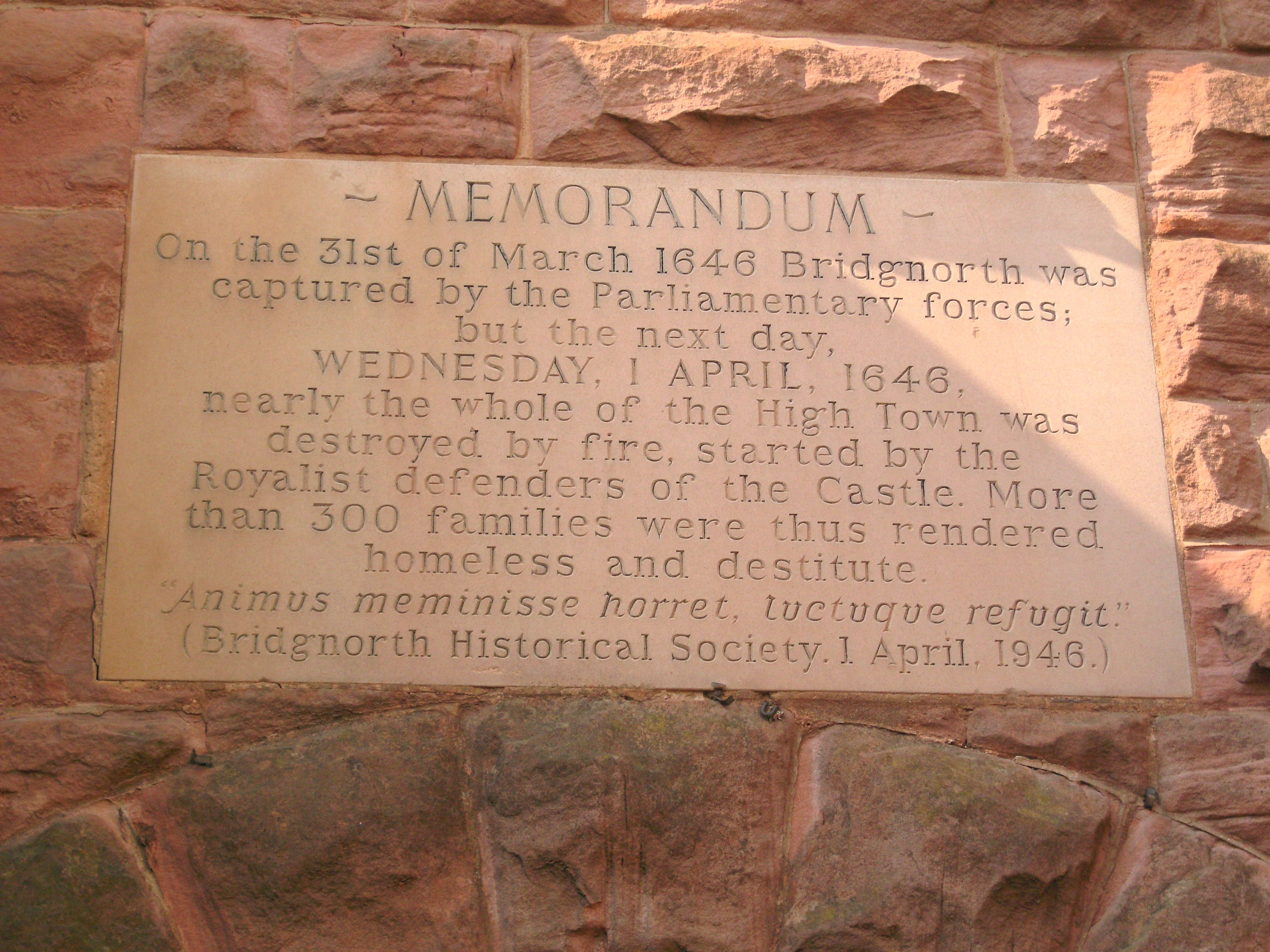
Inscription on Bridgnorth Museum, commemorating Sir Thomas Wolryche's deliberate destruction of the town in his defence of the castle against Parliamentary forces in 1646.

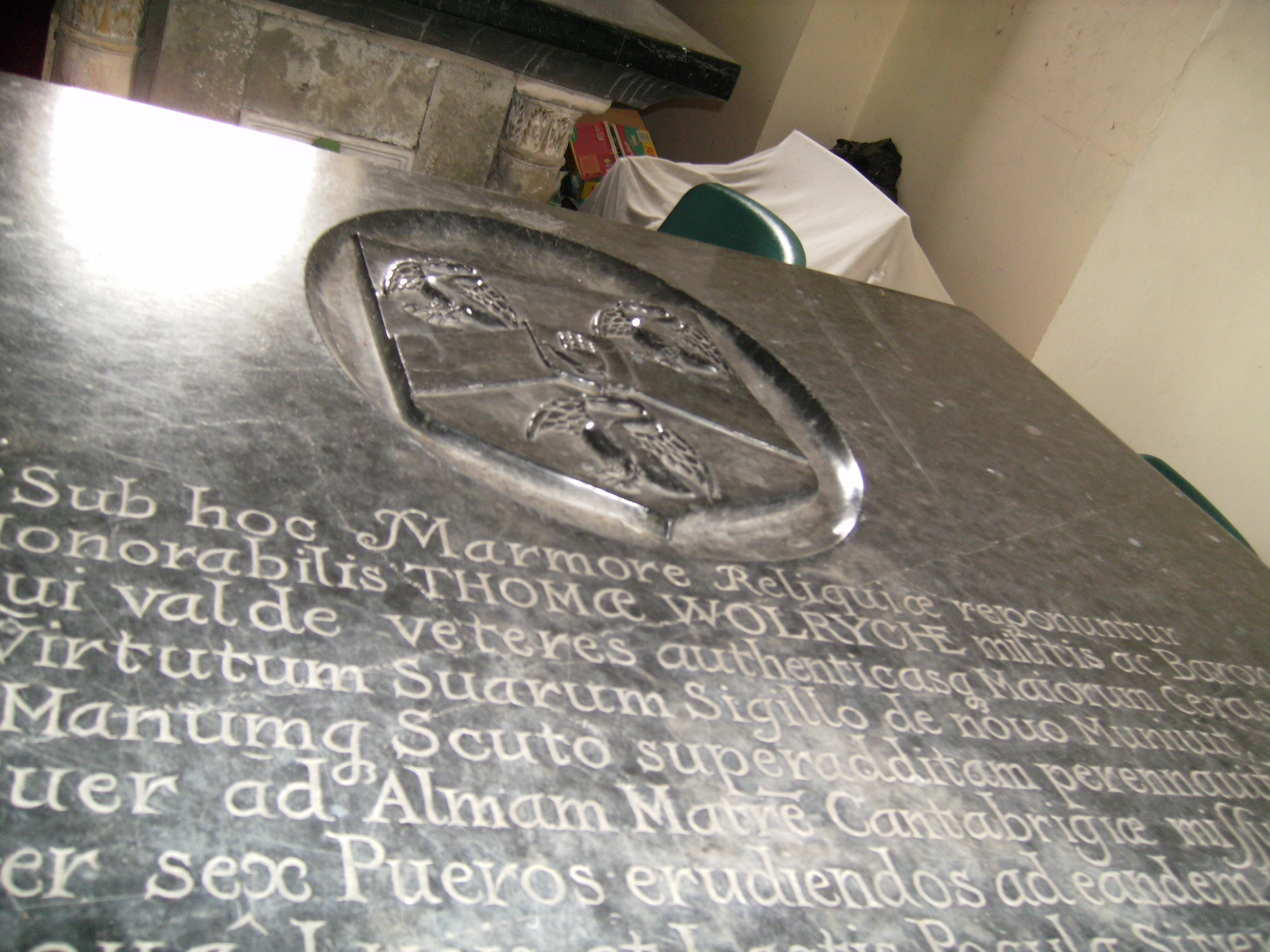
Inscription on Sir Thomas Wolryche's tomb, lauding his military achievements.

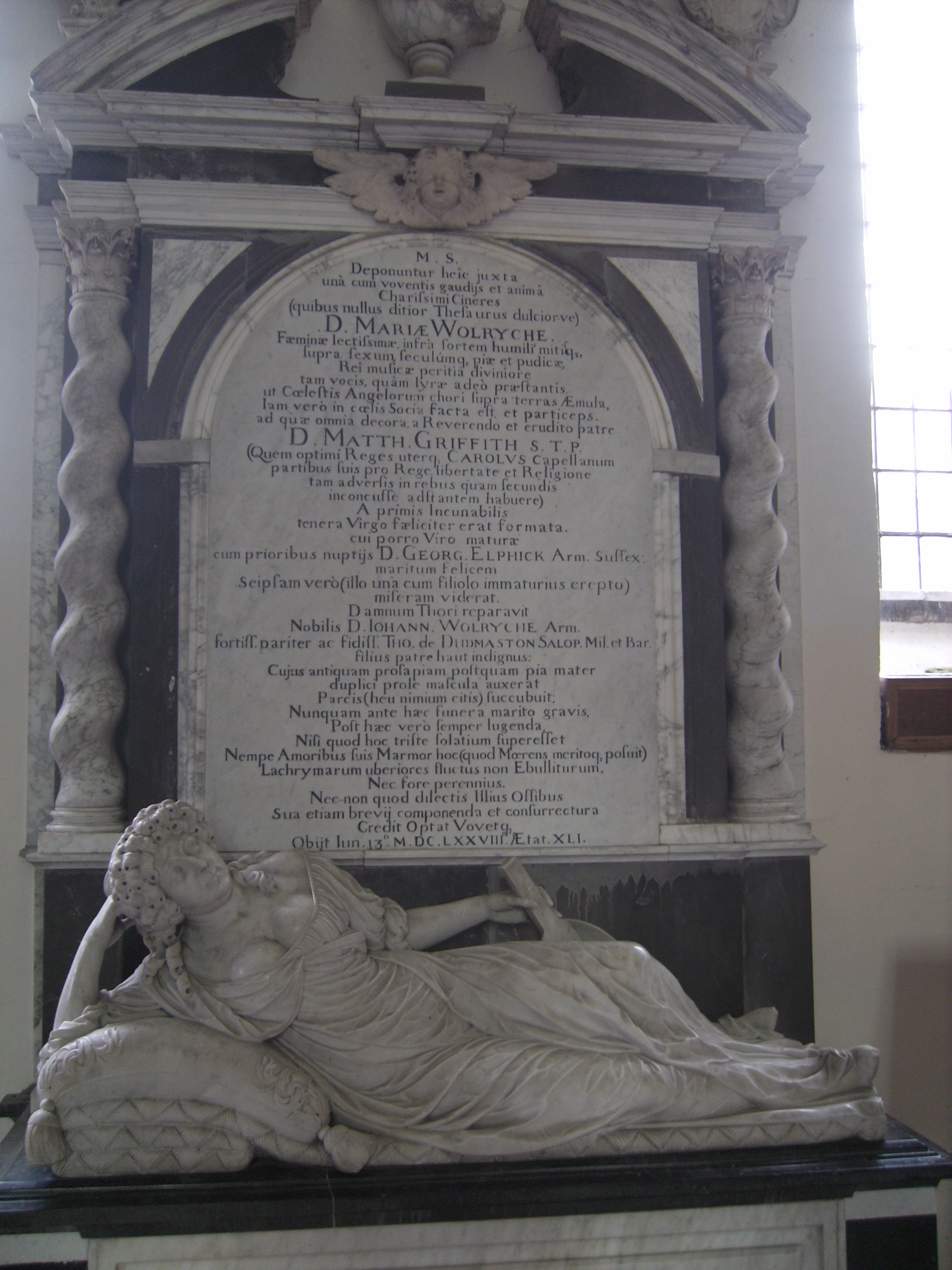
Tomb of Mary Wolryche, who died in 1678: wife of John Wolryche and daughter of Matthew Griffith, a prominent churchman.

=== Development of the gardens ===
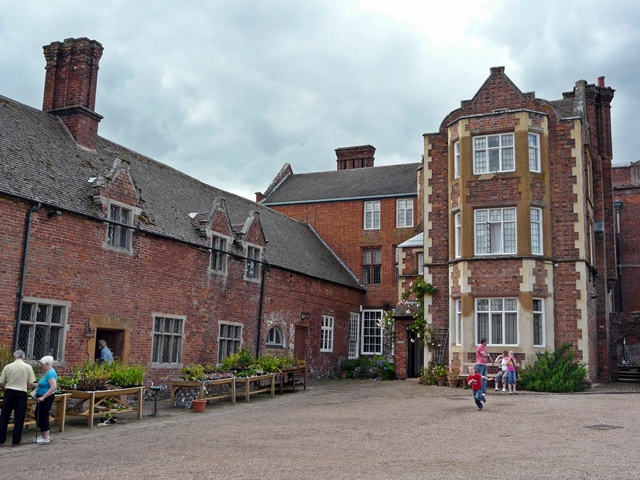
Stables and courtyard built by William Whitmore, 1786

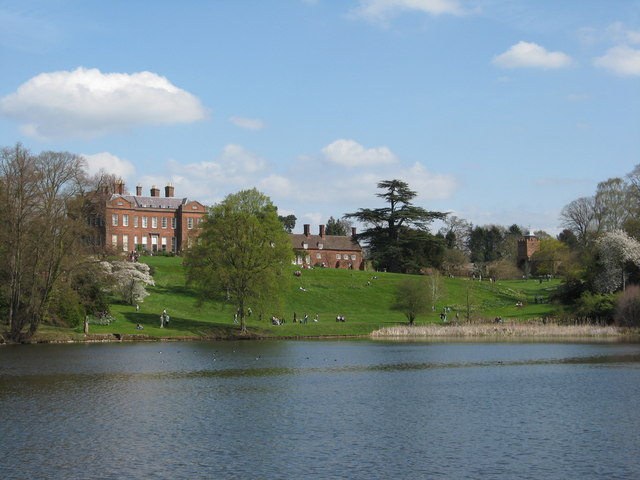
Dudmaston viewed across the Big Pool, which took its present form under William Wolryche-Whitmore

Colonel Weld outlived his niece and his sister to become the owner of Dudmaston. When he died in 1774, it passed to a distant cousin, George Whitmore, who died shortly afterwards, passing it to his nephew, William Whitmore (1745–1815). He was a seaman from Southampton who had also inherited a number of other large properties, giving him the resources to restore and reshape Dudmaston. He spent large sums on repairs and on refurnishing the hall.

Whitmore also commissioned the gardener and landscape designer William Emes to produce a scheme for the grounds. Emes came up with a formal plan but it was never executed. Instead, Whitmore left his wife, Frances Lister, and his own gardener, Walter Wood, to develop the grounds. Wood had previously worked on a Picturesque-style garden for the poet William Shenstone at The Leasowes, near Halesowen, then also part of the county of Shropshire. Carefully controlling the Quatt Brook, a small tributary of the Severn to the south of the hall, he now reshaped its course through the Dingle, a small, wooded valley, which was itself artfully quarried and sculpted. His small cliffs, waterfalls and rustic bridges created a framework for the winding paths and seating areas, laid out by Frances. It is unclear which Dingle came first, but it is likely there were cross-influences with that at Badger, Shropshire, where Emes certainly was involved in the design, and where the squire, Isaac Hawkins Browne was an associate of Whitmore. (Browne was soon to take a seat in the House of Commons for Dudmaston's pocket borough of Bridgnorth.)

Whitmore's son, also William, added the old family name of Wolryche to his own. A man of enormous energy, he not only had an active career as a reforming M.P., but also greatly modified the house and grounds. In the hall his improvements include a fine Regency staircase, new windows, and a large new dining room – now the modern art gallery. He also completely reshaped the landscape to the west, which forms the main view from the hall. The Big Pool was formed by combining three small lakes and terraces constructed, with small flights of steps and walls. To the south he broke the formality with the American Border, an area that was then planted mainly with rhododendrons but today contains a wide range of Asian and American plants.

== Features and amenities ==
The hall contains an outstanding art collection, described by the National Trust as "one of Britain's most important public collections of modern art", including sculptures by Henry Moore and Barbara Hepworth plus an extensive collection of mid-20th-century Spanish paintings and pottery, collected by former resident Sir George Labouchère during his diplomatic service.

Other than that, many activities go on around the estate – pig-farming, asparagus-growing. Dudmaston also features in its very own traditional way of "tushing" using a horse to pull logs in the woods where a tractor can not reach. This is done with a Fell Pony, which were originally used as pack ponies for carrying lead from the mines.

== Notable residents ==
=== William Wolryche-Whitmore ===
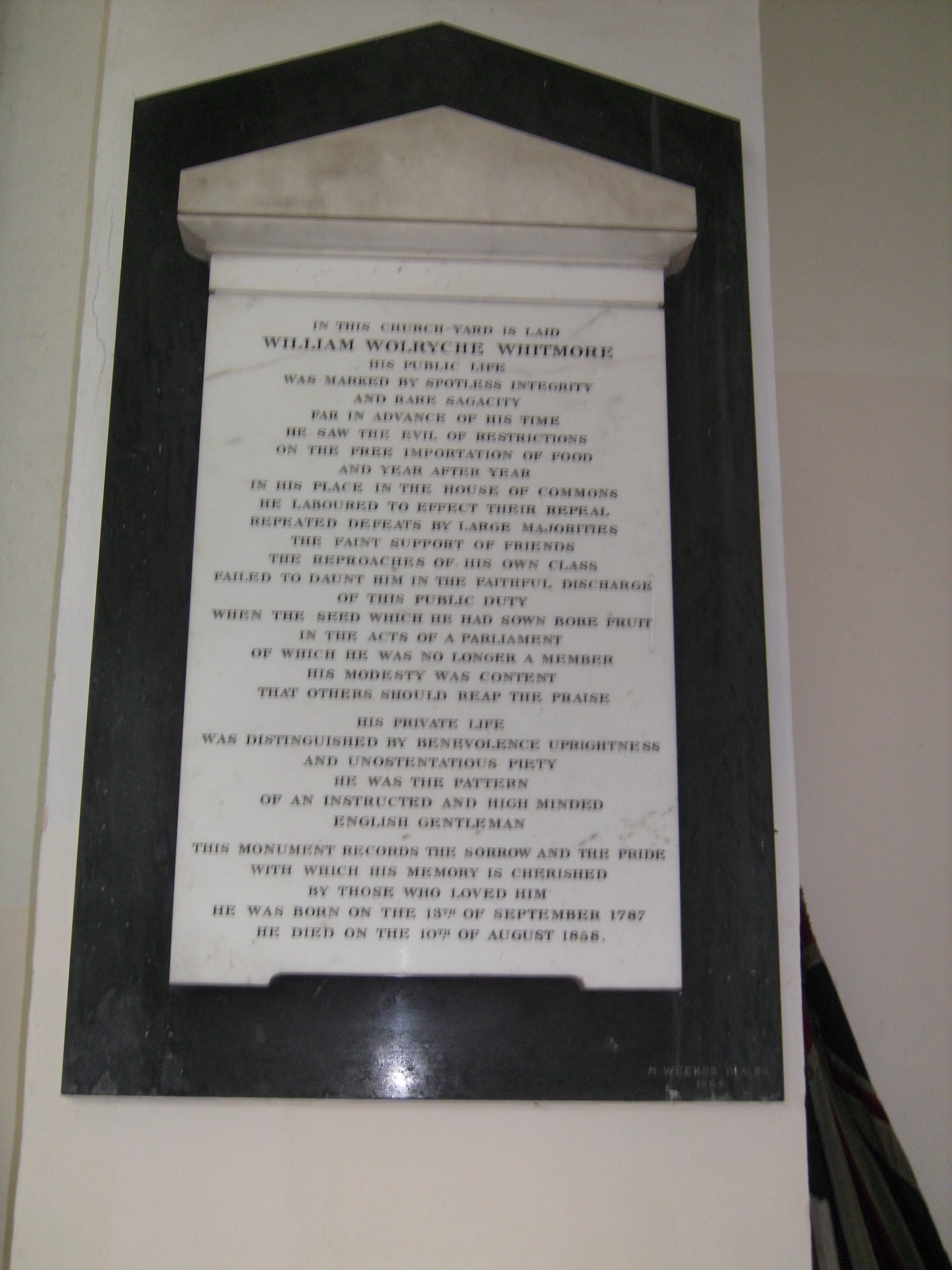
William Wolryche-Whitmore's epitaph in St. Andrew's church, Quatt

William Wolryche-Whitmore (1787–1858) was an important reforming politician. He was the son of William Whitmore, who inherited Dudmaston from a distant cousin, the last of the Wolryche Baronets, and Frances Lister. In 1810 he married Lady Lucy Bridgeman, daughter of the Earl of Bradford. The young couple set out on a Grand Tour, which included a visit to Napoleon Bonaparte, in exile on Elba. On the death of his father in 1815, William inherited Dudmaston and five years later he took up the family's parliamentary seat of Bridgnorth.

William quickly became a major spokesman for the liberal causes of Parliamentary Reform and Catholic Emancipation. He spoke against the power of the West Indian sugar planters and looked forward to the ending of Caribbean slavery. He warned of the disastrous consequences for the Indian economy of British colonialism. After the Reform Act 1832, he won the new parliamentary seat of Wolverhampton for the Whigs after a bitterly contested campaign. One of his major concerns was providing new opportunities for working-class people through emigration, and he strongly opposed the use of convict and slave labour everywhere. His last contribution in parliament was on the subject of emigration to South Australia.

Despite the fact that it could be considered against the interest of himself and his class, he campaigned long and hard for repeal of the Corn Laws. The great majority of his contributions in parliament were on this subject. He continued to campaign even after he left parliament. His successor in the Wolverhampton seat was Charles Pelham Villiers, another radical Whig who continued his anti-Corn Law work. The repeal was not achieved until 1846, when the Tory leader, Robert Peel, split his party to force the measure through with Whig support.

While continuing his political campaigns, William remodelled the house and the estate on more modern lines, diversifying the economic activities and improving conditions for his workers and tenants. This was at great cost, however, and he left mortgages totalling £60,000 to his nephew, Francis Laing, who inherited the estate on his death.

=== Charles Babbage ===
In 1814, Georgiana Whitmore, a daughter of William Whitmore and sister of the budding politician, married computing pioneer Charles Babbage. Babbage lived at Dudmaston Hall for significant periods and even engineered the central heating system. Their son Henry Prevost Babbage's 1910 Analytical Engine Mill was on display at Dudmaston Hall until the 1980s, after which it was moved to the Science Museum, London.

=== George and Rachel Labouchère ===
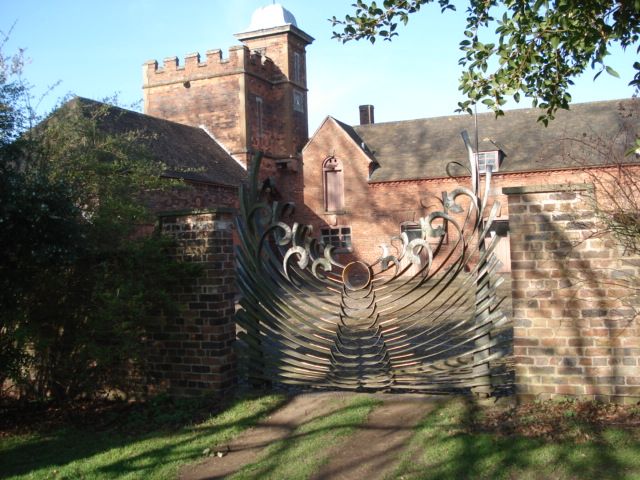
Eternity Gates by Antony Robinson, installed in 1983 to celebrate the ruby wedding anniversary of Sir George and Lady Rachel Labouchere

Rachel Hamilton-Russell (1908–1996) was the daughter of Olive, who was herself the daughter of Francis Wolryche-Whitmore and Alice Darby of Coalbrookdale. She was bequeathed the estate by her uncle, Geoffrey, on condition that it should pass to the National Trust. Rachel had trained as a botanical artist at the Flatford Field Studies Centre and established an important collection of paintings and drawings of plants at Dudmaston.

She met George Labouchère (1905–1999), a diplomat and scion of a Huguenot family, while working at the Admiralty during World War II in 1942 and was to marry him the following year. They agreed that she would accompany him to his diplomatic postings and that he would then retire to Dudmaston with her. George's next posting was to Stockholm, and Rachel had to fly over the North Sea to marry him there, forced to turn back once when the cloud cleared and left the aeroplane exposed to German attack. Subsequent postings were in China, from 1946 to 1948, and then in Argentina, Austria, Hungary and Belgium. George was knighted in 1955 and appointed ambassador to Francoist Spain in 1960. It was there that the Lachouchères acquired an important group of artworks, produced by artists of the left-wing opposition to the regime – a significant component of the collection they would install at Dudmaston.

Uncle Geoffrey moved out in 1966, allowing Rachel and George to retire to Dudmaston. The process of transferring it to the National Trust was completed in 1978, although they continued to reside in the house and to improve both it and the grounds. They established a sizeable collection of modern art, alongside a collection of material inherited from the Wolryche-Whitmores and the Darbys. Following a strong interest in the economic and social history of the region, Rachel campaigned for the preservation and enhancement of the industrial heritage of the Severn Valley. She served for fourteen years as president of the Ironbridge Gorge Museum Trust, which was established in 1967. Almost until her death she was active at Dudmaston, frequently engaging visitors in discussion.

The couple had no children and Rachel died in 1996. George outlived her by three years.

Rachel Labouchère left a memorandum of wishes with the National Trust stipulating that a tenancy would always be available to her relatives, to keep Dudmaston a family home, as it had been for over 850 years. She nominated her second cousin, Col. James Hamilton-Russell, whose descendants still live there today.

== See also ==
- Grade II* listed buildings in Shropshire (district) (A–G)
- Listed buildings in Quatt Malvern
