= Samuel Brookes =

Welsh footballer

Samuel James Brookes
Personal information
- Date of birth: 26 October 1879
- Place of birth: Llandudno, Wales
- Date of death: 20 June 1938 (aged 58)
- Place of death: Saskatoon, Canada
- Height: 5 ft 4 in (1.63 m)
- Position: Wing half

Senior career*
Years	Team	Apps	(Gls)
1896-1900	Llandudno Swifts		
1897	London Welsh		
1900-1901	Rhyl		
1901	Blackpool	1	(0)
1901-1905	Rhyl		

International career
1900	Wales	2	(0)
- * Club domestic league appearances and goals

Samuel Brookes (born 26 October 1879) was a Welsh international footballer. He was part of the Wales national football team, playing 2 matches. He played his first match on 24 February 1900 against Ireland and his last match on 26 March 1900 against England.

== See also ==
- List of Wales international footballers (alphabetical)
