= John Rea (papyrologist) =

British papyrologist (1933–2023)

John Rowland Rea, FBA (1933 – 2023) was a British papyrologist. He was lecturer in Documentary Papyrology at the University of Oxford from 1965 to 1996.

Born in 1933, Rea completed his undergraduate degree at Queen's University Belfast and his doctorate at the University of London. In 1957, he was appointed an assistant keeper of the Public Record Office and in 1961 moved to Christ Church, Oxford, to be a resident lecturer. He left Christ Church in 1965 and was then employed by the University of Oxford as lecturer in Documentary Papyrology from 1965 to 1996. He was elected to a senior research fellowship at Balliol College, Oxford, in 1969, also retiring in 1996. Rea edited several volumes of the Oxyrhynchus Papyri (vols. 40, 46, 51, 51, 58 and 62) between 1972 and 1996, and co-authored volume 5 of Corpus Papyrorum Raineri in 1976. He was elected a Fellow of the British Academy in 1981.

Rea died on 2023, at the age of 88–89.
