= John Rea (artistic director) =

John Rea (born 1967) is an American playwright/lyricist/composer and Artistic Director of MacGuffin Theatre & Film Company in Philadelphia, Pennsylvania, USA since 1998.

Rea earned a BA in music from Temple University and a MA in theater from Villanova University.

He was the director of Discovery Division for youth at the Walnut Street Theatre from 1995 to 1999. He was the Literary Manager/Dramaturg for Philadelphia Theatre Company from 1997 to 1999. He has directed or produced all MacGuffin productions and teaches a variety of classes there, as well. He has directed several film projects for MacGuffin including: Clueless, After Midnight Scream for Monty Python's Ghostbusting Brother, Getting Out and Chasing the MacGuffin (documentary), Happy Birthday and A Real Kiss. He has composed music to many shows including Romeo and Juliet, Arcadia, and The Women of Argos. As a playwright/composer/lyricist he has written Dodger, The Skeleton Woman, Mak and the Shepherds, Cinderella Story, More Than Anything, The Three Trees, As I Do (Playwriting Award, Cleveland Public Theatre), The Lost, The Cruel Sister, A Place Called Up, The Tale of Orpheus, Mischief Manor, Dodger, The Tale of Ebenezer Scrooge, The Fiery Furnace and Jonah and the Big Fish and Vito. He has taught music and drama in the Philadelphia School District and the Delaware County School District.
