= John Rea (horticulturalist) =

17th-century nursery gardener, horticulturist, and author

John Rea (died November 1681) was an English nursery gardener and writer.

== Life ==
Rea lived at Kinlet in Shropshire. As a gardener he was reputed to have had the largest collection of tulips in England, to have introduced new plants, and to have planned the gardens at Gerard's Bromley, Staffordshire, the seat of Charles Gerard, 4th Baron Gerard, to whose son he dedicated his Flora. He corresponded with Sir Thomas Hanmer, 2nd Baronet, interested in gardening, and in particular in tulips; Hanmer commended Rea's Flora to John Evelyn, but thought him no scholar.

Rea died in November 1681, bequeathing his holding at Kinlet to his daughter Minerva, wife of Samuel Gilbert.

== Works ==
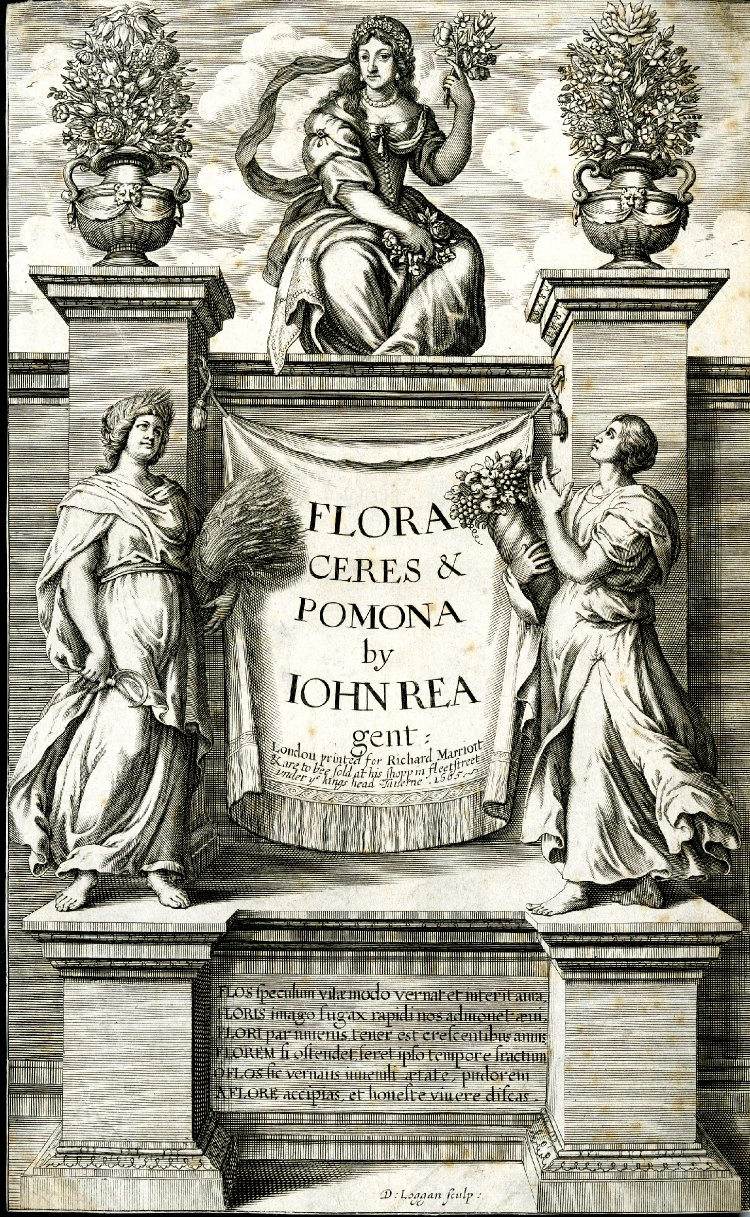
Flora, Ceres, and Pomona, secondary title-page by David Loggan, 1665

Rea wrote Flora, seu de Florum Cultura, or a complete Florilege, with a second title-page as Flora, Ceres, and Pomona, in III. Books, London, 1665. A second impression, appeared in 1676 and was reissued, with a new title-page, in 1702.

== Notes ==
Attribution

This article incorporates text from a publication now in the public domain: Lee, Sidney, ed. (1896). "Rea, John". Dictionary of National Biography. Vol. 47. London: Smith, Elder & Co.
