= John Rea (footballer) =

Welsh footballer

Personal information
- Full name: John Charles Rea
- Date of birth: 21 December 1868
- Place of birth: Lledrod, Wales
- Date of death: 4 February 1944
- Place of death: Aberystwyth, Wales
- Position: Winger

Senior career*
Years	Team	Apps	(Gls)
1888–1889	Ardwyn		
1889–1890	Upton Excelsiors		
1890–1891	London Caledonians		
1891–1892	London Welsh		
1892–1893	Aberystwyth Town		
1894–1895	West Bromwich Albion	1	(0)
1895–1896	Aberystwyth Town		
1896–1897	West Bromwich Albion	0	(0)
1898	Aberystwyth Town		

International career
1894–1898	Wales	9	(1)
Military career
Spouse	Florence Isabel Elkes (m. 1908; died 1936)
Children	3
Allegiance	United Kingdom
Branch	Territorial Force
Service years	1901–1921
Rank	Lieutenant colonel
Unit	2nd Welsh Brigade
Conflicts	World War I: Western Front; Sinai and Palestine campaign
Awards	1914–15 Star; British War Medal; Victory Medal
- * Club domestic league appearances and goals

Lieutenant Colonel John Charles Rea (21 December 1868 – 4 February 1944) was a Welsh footballer who played in the Football League for West Bromwich Albion, and earned nine caps for the Wales national team.

== Club career ==
Rea's only game for West Bromwich Albion was on 15 December 1894 in a 3–2 win against Stoke.

== International career ==
Rea made his international debut for Wales on 24 February 1894 in the 1893–94 British Home Championship against Ireland, which finished as a 4–1 home win. He earned nine caps in total for Wales and scored one goal, with his last appearance coming on 19 February 1898 in the 1897–98 British Home Championship against Ireland, which finished as a 0–1 home loss.

== Military career ==
In 1902, Rea was a Lieutenant in the Royal Garrison Artillery (Volunteers), though volunteer units were reorganised in 1908 with the creation of the Territorial Force. One of the new units formed was the 2nd Welsh Brigade of the Royal Field Artillery, with one battery of the new field artillery brigade provided by the 1st Cardigan Royal Garrison Artillery (Volunteers), becoming the Cardiganshire Battery. Rea served as the commanding officer of the battery by 1912. In August 1914, after World War I was declared, Rea took up his duty of battery commander within the first line division of the Welsh Division, later renamed the 53rd (Welsh) Infantry Division. The divisional artillery were ordered to France to join the British Expeditionary Force, where he arrived in November 1915. The divisional artillery rejoined the rest of the division in Egypt in January 1916, later serving in Palestine. Rea survived the war, and returned to his family business. In 1922, he received the 1914–15 Star, British War Medal and Victory Medal at Terrace Road, Aberystwyth.

=== Awards ===

- 1914–15 Star
- British War Medal
- Victory Medal

== Personal life ==
Rea was born on 21 December 1868 in Lledrod, to John Rea of Worcester and Mary Anne Williams of Newtown. In 1906, he took over the licence and lease for the family's hotel, and converted it to a restaurant with a grocery store. He married Florence Isabel Elkes in 1908 in Birkenhead, and had three children by 1911. Rea lived in Aberystwyth with his wife, who died in 1936. In 1944, he died in Aberystwyth at the age of 75.

== Career statistics ==
=== International ===
Wales
Year	Apps	Goals
1894	3	1
1895	1	0
1896	2	0
1897	2	0
1898	1	0
Total	9	1
