= Frederick Chittenden =

British botanist (1873–1950)

Frederick James Chittenden
- Born: 25 October 1873; West Ham
- Died: 31 July 1950 (aged 76); Dedham, Essex
- Education: Carpenter's Institute, East Anglian Institute of Agriculture
- Known for: Botanical taxonomy, Horticulture
- Spouse: Esther Ada Farnes 1901–1950
- Awards: Victoria Medal of Honour, OBE
- Scientific career
- Institutions: East Anglian Institute of Agriculture, RHS Wisley 1919–1931
- Author abbrev. (botany): Chitt.

Frederick James Chittenden OBE, FLS, VMH (1873–1950) was a British horticulturalist and first director of the Royal Horticultural Society (RHS) Wisley Garden. He was the author of a number of books on horticulture.

== Life ==
Frederick Chittenden was born, the son of William Chittenden at West Ham on 25 October 1873 and educated at Leyton in East London, at the Carpenter's Institute in nearby Stratford, and at the County Technical Laboratories, Chelmsford (later the East Anglian Institute of Agriculture, and then in 2016 Writtle University College). In 1901 he married Esther Ada Farnes. On 31 July 1950 he died of cancer at Dedham, Essex where he had retired to, and was survived by his wife.

== Work ==
After completing his education, Chitttenden became a lecturer in botany at the Woolwich Polytechnic in 1889, before returning to teach at the East Anglian Institute of Agriculture. On the opening of the laboratory at the Royal Horticultural Society (RHS) Garden at Wisley in 1907, Chittenden was appointed as its first director and remained with the RHS for the rest of his life, adding editorship of the Journal of the Royal Horticultural Society to his duties in 1908, while he also became responsible for most of RHS's educational programmes and became Director of the Garden in 1919. In 1931, as the work at Wisley had expanded greatly, publication of the Journal was moved to the RHS building on Vincent Square, London. Chittenden retained editorship and also took on the job of librarian at the RHS (1931–1939), being succeeded at Wisley by then curator Robert Lewis Harrow, (Note: 1867–1954) (1931–1946).

Chittenden was heavily involved in the development of botanical nomenclature. In 1927, at the 8th International Horticultural Congress, an International Committee for Horticultural Nomenclature was set up with A. B. Rendle, Keeper of Botany, British Museum, as chairman, and Chittenden, as secretary. Both had helped to prepare The Royal Horticultural Society's memorandum on nomenclature to the 1910 Brussels Congress. When Rendle died in January 1938 his place was taken by Chittenden. William Stearn succeeded Chittenden on his death.

In 1939 Frederick Chittenden set aside the editorship and librarianship to concentrate on producing a revised edition of Nicholson's Dictionary of Gardening, one of the Royal Horticultural Society's most ambitious publishing enterprises which would eventually appear as the four volume RHS Dictionary of Gardening, a task which occupied the rest of his life. However the Second World War took its toll, Chittenden being forced to leave London and work from Dedham, without proper access to either the resources he needed or his contributors. After the war ended his failing health left him struggling to complete the project, leaving it unfinished on his death but completed by W. T. Stearn, then RHS librarian.

== Awards ==
Chittended was elected Fellow of the Linnean Society (FLS) in 1908, awarded the RHS Victoria Medal of Honour (VMH) in 1917, the Veitch Memorial Medal in 1948 and the OBE in 1950.

== Selected publications ==
- Huxley, Anthony; Griffiths, Mark; Levy, Margot (1992) [1st ed. Frederick Chittenden and William Stearn. Oxford University Press 1951. 2nd ed. P.M. Synge (ed.) Oxford 1956]. The New Royal Horticultural Society Dictionary of Gardening (4 vols.). London: Macmillan. ISBN 978-0333474945.
- Chittenden, F. J. (1920). The Garden Doctor. London: Scribner.

== Legacy ==
A cultivar of Hamamelis mollis is named after him.

== Bibliography ==
- Stearn, W. T. (7 September 1952). "International Code of Nomenclature for Cultivated Plants". Bromeliad Society International. Archived from the original (Address given by the Secretary of the International Committee on Horticultural Nomenclature and Registration at the opening meeting) on 18 April 2016.
- MBG. "Hamamelis mollis 'Fred Chittenden'". Missouri Botanical Garden.
- "Chittenden, Frederick James (1873–1950) botanist". National Archives.
- Higgins, Vera (March 1951). "Obituaries: Frederick James Chittenden". Proceedings of the Linnean Society of London. 162 (2): 229. doi:10.1111/j.1095-8312.1951.tb00621.x.
- Desmond, Ray (1994) [1977]. Dictionary of British and Irish botanists and horticulturalists: including plant collectors, flower painters and garden designers (2nd ed.). London: Taylor & Francis. ISBN 9780850668438.
- Anonymous (11 May 2001). "William T. Stearn". The Times (obituary).
