= Journal of the Linnean Society =

Journal of the Linnean Society is a series of specialised journals published by the Linnean Society of London:

- Biological Journal of the Linnean Society
- Botanical Journal of the Linnean Society
- Zoological Journal of the Linnean Society
