= John Akeroyd =

Botanist

John Robert Akeroyd
- Born: 1952 (age 73–74)
- Education: St. Andrew's University, Cambridge University
- Known for: Botany, Polygonaceae
- Scientific career
- Institutions: University of Reading
- Author abbrev. (botany): Akeroyd

John Robert Akeroyd FLS (1952–) is a British botanist.

== Life and work ==
Educated at St. Andrew's University, he proceeded to Cambridge University for his doctorate on the ecological genetics of weeds. His post-doctoral work was at Trinity College, Dublin (1979–1981), and then at the University of Reading, Plant Sciences Department as a post-doctoral fellow (1981–1999). At Reading he worked on the Flora Europaea. He succeeded William Stearn as editor of the Annales Musei Goulandris in 1999, and also editor of Watsonia. He has served as a vice-president of the Botanical Society of Britain and Ireland. there he was referee for Polygonaceae, and also served on the Meetings and Publications Committee. He frequently contributes to popular articles on conservation and botany and co-founded Plant Talk conservation magazine associated with the Eden Project. He is also known for his culinary skills.

He collected plants from the Mediterranean and Ireland, and contributed to the herbarium at Reading. John Akeroyd is the botanical authority, for a nearly twenty taxa, such as Arenaria serpyllifolia L. subsp. aegaea (Rech.f.) Akeroyd. He was elected a Fellow of the Linnean Society (FLS) in 1982.

== Selected publications ==
- Akeroyd, John (2008). A Beginner's Guide to Ireland's Wild Flowers. Sherkin Island Marine Station. ISBN 9781870492232.
- The wild plants of Sherkin, Cape Clear and adjacent Islands of West Cork. Sherkin Island Marine Station (1996)

== Bibliography ==
- Akeroyd, John (2006). "Preface". Annales Musei Goulandris (11): 35–36.
- Akeroyd, John (2006a). "William Thomas Stearn (1911-2001)". Annales Musei Goulandris (11): 9–16.
- Decraene, Louis-Philippe Ronse; Akeroyd, J. R. (December 1988). "Generic limits in Polygonum and related genera (Polygonaceae) on the basis of floral characters". Botanical Journal of the Linnean Society. 98 (4): 321–371. doi:10.1111/j.1095-8339.1988.tb01706.x.
- BSBI (September 1983). "Council members 1983–1984" (PDF). BSBI News (34).
- Culham, Alastair (20 January 2004). "John Robert Akeroyd". Culham Research Group. University of Reading.
- Jury, Stephen L. (1 November 1994). "Obituary: David Allerdice Webb". Plant Science Laboratories Herbarium News (34). University of Reading.
- "A Day in the Life of John Akeroyd" (PDF). Nature's Web (3): 7. Autumn 2006.
- "Aims". Plant-talk. Archived from the original on 16 August 2009.

IPNI. List of plant names with authority Akeroyd.
