= Flora Graeca =

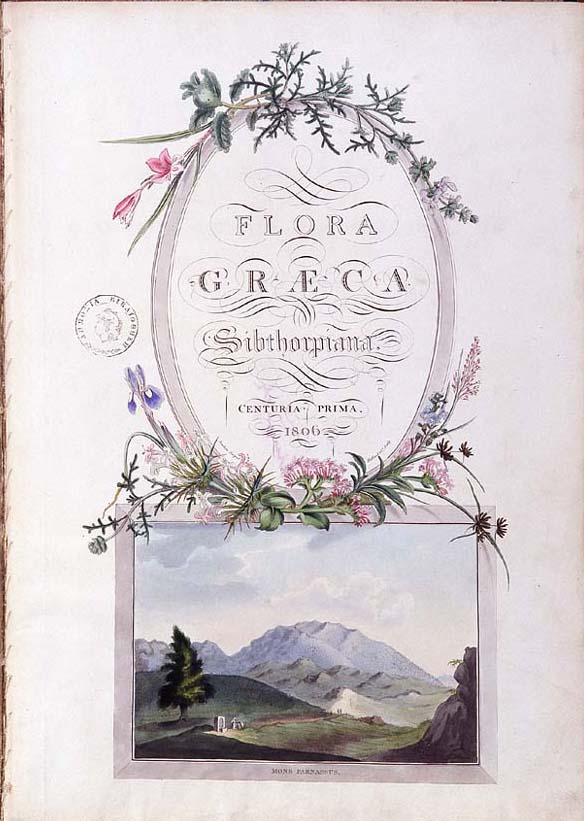
- Cover to the first edition
- Author: John Sibthorp, Smith
- Illustrator: Ferdinand Bauer, et al
- Series: 10 volumes
- Subject: A Flora
- Publication date: 1806 to 1840
- Publication place: England
- Media type: Volumes with plates

Flora Graeca is a publication of the plants of Greece in the late 18th century, resulting from a survey by John Sibthorp and Ferdinand Bauer. The botanical descriptions and illustrations became highly valued by the English audience; the finely crafted and illustrated work was of both scientific and horticultural interest.

Sibthorp met the botanical illustrator Bauer in Vienna, where he had made a voyage to study a copy of Dioscorides' early botanical work, the renowned Vienna Dioscurides. This was the first part of a journey, to identify medicinal plants used in Greece; Bauer was to join the expedition as the illustrator. They were to record and collect a large number of novel specimens; their publication introduced these to an English audience. From March 1786 to December 1787 they surveyed the plants and animals of the eastern Mediterranean, Sibthorp collecting and describing, Bauer making dried specimens and producing colour-coded sketches. Bauer's work, including around a thousand intricate and annotated sketches, is now regarded as one of the finest examples of botanical illustration.

Sibthorp's volumes were to become a botanical publication, the original intention to produce a herbal or medical volume was transformed into a scientific survey. An accompanying volume, Fauna Graeca, and other planned works on the region, was not realised.

Sibthorp assembled the descriptions and plates, at his death in 1796 his will included an endowment to see the book published. The task of preparing the works was undertaken by James Edward Smith, who issued the two volumes of the Prodromus in 1806 and 1813, and six volumes as Flora Graeca Sibthorpiana between 1806 and 1828. The seventh appeared in 1830, after Smith's death, and the remaining three were produced by John Lindley between 1833 and 1840.

Each volume contained a hundred plates, except the last, and these were engraved by James Sowerby. Only 30 copies of this set were issued, another 50 complete sets were reissued in 1845 by Henry George Bohn. The cost in 1830 was 620 pounds. The scarcity of the early first editions led to doubt of their existence, the rare book is at the higher end of trade. The inherent value has led the Bodleian Libraries to make available a digital scan of the complete set.

The publication was issued with tables and indices of the scientific name, the common name in Greek was in this concordance. It was during a period of increasing interest in horticulture and highly desired exotic species were described, many would become perennials of the English flower garden.

== Bibliography ==
- Hu Walsh (23 October 2003). "Ferdinand Lukas Bauer". Rare books. Missouri Botanical Garden. Archived from the original on 24 September 2015. "production costs were excessive so only a limited number of volumes saw the light of day. Yet Stearn (7:34),† ranks Flora Gracea as a masterpiece of printing, engraving, color and design, and notes, "...it is the most costly and beautiful book devoted to any flora."" († see Stearn 1960)
- Harris, Stephen (2007). The Magnificent Flora Graeca; How the Mediterranean Came to the English Garden. ISBN 978-1-85124-306-8.
- Lack, H. W.; Mabberley, David (1998). The Flora Graeca Story: Sibthorp, Bauer, and Hawkins in the Levant. Oxford University Press. ISBN 0-19-854897-4.
- Stearn, William T. (1 January 1967). "Sibthorp, Smith, the 'Flora Graeca' and the 'Florae Graecae Prodromus'". Taxon. 16 (3): 168–178. doi:10.2307/1216982. JSTOR 1216982.
- Stearn, William T. (December 1976). "From Theophrastus and Dioscorides to Sibthorp and Smith: the background and origin of the Flora Graeca". Biological Journal of the Linnean Society. 8 (4): 285–298. doi:10.1111/j.1095-8312.1976.tb00251.x. PMID 11631653.
- Stearn, William T. (1960). "Franz Bauer and Ferdinand Bauer, masters of botanical illustration". Endeavour. First Series. 19: 27–35.
