= Allium chrysonemum =

Conservation status
- Data Deficient (IUCN 3.1)

Scientific classification
- Kingdom: Plantae
- Clade: Tracheophytes
- Clade: Angiosperms
- Clade: Monocots
- Order: Asparagales
- Family: Amaryllidaceae
- Subfamily: Allioideae
- Genus: Allium
- Species: A. chrysonemum

Binomial name
- Allium chrysonemum Stearn

Species of flowering plant

Allium chrysonemum is a species of onions native the Sierra de Cazorla mountain range in southeastern Spain.
