= H. B. D. Woodcock =

His Honour Hubert Bayley Drysdale Woodcock
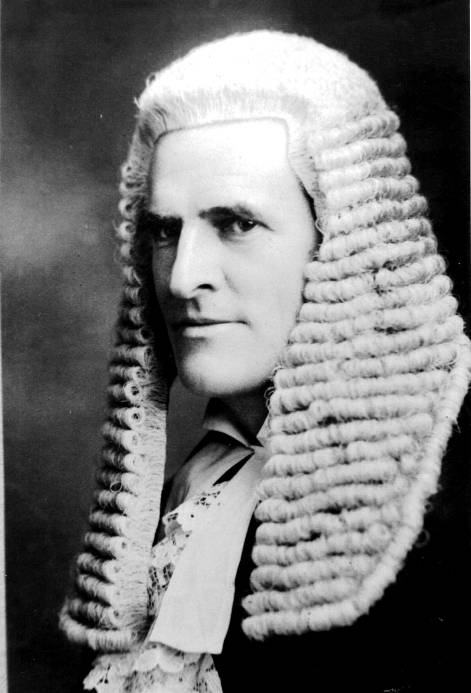
- Born: 1867; Antigua
- Died: 1957 (aged 89–90); Bisley, Gloucestershire
- Citizenship: British
- Education: Eastbourne College; City of London School
- Known for: Liliaceae and Spermatophytes
- Scientific career
- Fields: Law, Botany
- Author abbrev. (botany): Woodcock

Hubert Bayley Drysdale Woodcock, QC, FLS (born 1867 in Antigua, West Indies; died 12 February 1957 at Jayne's Court, Bisley, Gloucestershire), known as Judge Woodcock, was a British jurist and amateur botanist. He wrote and illustrated standard books and articles on Liliaceae, which he studied and cultivated at his estate at Lypiatt Park in the Gloucestershire Cotswolds.

His two principal works are (with William Thomas Stearn) Lilies of the World: Their Cultivation and Classification (London: Country Life, 1950) and (with J. Coutts) Lilies: their culture and management: including a complete descriptive list of species (London and New York, 1935).

Professionally, he was a barrister of the Middle Temple; KC 1923; a judge of the County Courts from 1920 to 1940; and a member of the Mauritius Royal Commission of 1909. A Liberal in politics, he contested a number of Parliamentary seats on behalf of the Party 1910-18 without success.

He was the son of Thomas Woodcock, of Antigua, a British colonial administrator and Queen's Advocate of the Gold Coast colony. In 1891 he married Charlotte, daughter of George Boyce Gwyn, of Hampstead, by whom he had one son and two daughters.
