= Andrew Thomas Gage =

Scottish botanist and surgeon

Andrew Thomas Gage FLS CIE
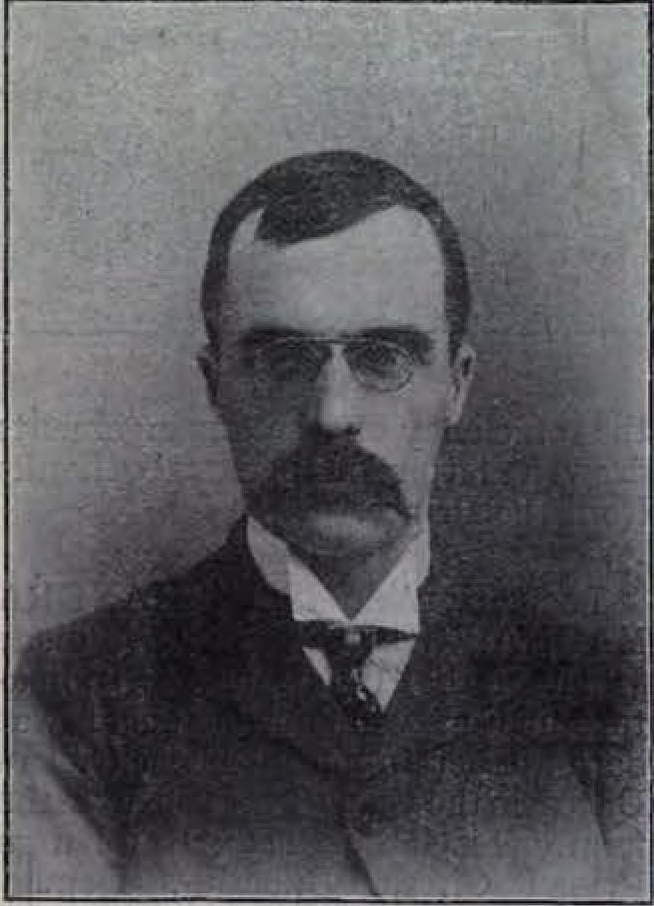
- Andrew Gage c. 1907
- Born: 14 December 1871; Aberdeen, Scotland
- Died: 21 January 1945 (aged 73); Strathpeffer, Ross and Cromarty, Scotland
- Education: Aberdeen Grammar School; University of Aberdeen
- Spouse: Jean Sturt Bruce
- Scientific career
- Fields: Surgeon; Botanist
- Author abbrev. (botany): Gage

Andrew Thomas Gage FLS CIE (14 December 1871 – 21 January 1945) was a Scottish botanist and surgeon in the Indian Medical Service who worked at the Calcutta Botanical Garden.

== Biography ==
Gage was born on 14 December 1871 in Aberdeen, Scotland, the son of Robert Gage. He attended Aberdeen Grammar School before going to the University of Aberdeen graduating MA in 1891 and BSc in 1893. He worked as professor of botany at the University of Aberdeen until 1896. He then studied medicine and joined the Indian Medical Service, going to India in 1898 and serving in the North-West Frontier. He was then posted curator to the herbarium of the Royal Botanic Garden at Calcutta to succeed David Prain who moved to become director and in this position he made several collection expedition. When Prain moved to Kew in 1905, Gage became the superintendent of the botanical garden. He was also involved in establishing cinchona cultivation and taught at the Medical College in Calcutta. He retired from the directorship of the botanical garden in 1923 and was succeeded by Charles Cumming Calder. He was appointed CIE on 1 January 1923. He died in Strathpeffer, Ross and Cromarty, Scotland.

Gage was admitted Fellow of the Linnean Society in 1908. He worked on the manuscript by Benjamin Daydon Jackson to produce a History of the Linnean Society of London (1938) which was further expanded upon by W.T. Stearn in 1988. He was married to Jean Sturt Bruce of Kildrummy.

== Selected publications ==
- 1901: A Botanical Tour in the South Lushai Hills
- 1901: On the anatomy of the roots of Phoenix paludosa Roxb.
- 1903: A Census of the Indian Polygonums
- 1904: The Vegetation of the District of Minbu in Upper Burma
- 1912: Catalogue of Non-herbaceous Phanerogams Cultivated in the Royal Botanic Garden, Calcutta
- 1916: Letters to Nathaniel Wallich, 1819-1821
- 1918: Report on the extension of Cinchona cultivation in India
- 1922: Euphorbiaceae novae e Peninsula Malayana
- 1938: A History of the Linnean Society of London
