= Wilfrid Jasper Walter Blunt =

Botanical artist and curator of a UK art gallery

Wilfrid Jasper Walter Blunt (19 July 1901 – 8 January 1987), known simply as Wilfrid Blunt, was an English art teacher, writer, artist and a curator of the Watts Gallery in Compton, Surrey, from 1959 until 1983.

== Life ==
His parents were the Rev. Arthur Stanley Vaughan and Hilda Violet (born Master) Blunt, of Paris. Blunt was born at Ham in Surrey and educated at Marlborough College, where he was a scholar, leaving in July 1920 for Worcester College, Oxford, where he was an exhibitioner, finally at the Royal College of Art.

He was art master at Haileybury College (1923–1938) and then at Eton College (1938–1959) and helped modify the hand-writing of British school-children, using the fifteenth-century Italian Cancellaresca ("Chancery") script as a basis, although one of his students at Eton reminisced that after being taken off Art to improve his handwriting, Mr Blunt failed to make it any more legible.

For his book The Art of Botanical Illustration in 1950 he was awarded the Veitch Memorial Medal by the Royal Horticultural Society. This book was considered the first comprehensive review of botanical illustration in Europe. Subsequent editions (by his co-author, Willian T. Stearn) provided coverage of more of the world and the twentieth century.

The sixth international exhibition of botanical art and illustration held in 1988 at the Hunt Institute for Botanical Documentation, USA, was dedicated to Blunt. He had been a member of the Advisory Committee to the Institute since 1964.

He died in Guildford on 8 January 1987.

His brothers were the numismatist Christopher Evelyn Blunt and Anthony Blunt, art historian and spy for the Soviets. His namesake Wilfrid Scawen Blunt was a distant family cousin.

== Books ==
- Haileybury Buildings (1936); 2nd edition (1966)
- Desert Hawk: Abd el Kader and the French Conquest of Algeria (Methuen, 1947)
- The Art of Botanical Illustration (1950) with William T. Stearn
- Tulipomania (Penguin, 1950) from the King Penguin Books series
- Black Sunrise: The Life and Times of Mulai Ismail, Emperor of Morocco 1646-1727 (1951)
- Sweet Roman Hand: Five Hundred Years of Italic Cursive Script (1952)
- Pietro's Pilgrimage: A Journey to India and Back at the Beginning of the Seventeenth Century (1953)
- Sebastiano: The Adventures of an Italian Priest, Sebastiano Locatelli, During his Journey from Bologna to Paris and Back 1664-1665 (1956)
- Great Flower Books, 1700-1900: A Bibliographical Record of Two Centuries of Finely-illustrated Flower Books (1956), Sacheverell Sitwell, Wilfrid Blunt and Patrick Millington Synge, Atlantic Monthly Press (1990) ISBN 0871132842
- A Persian Spring (James Barrie Books, Ltd., 1957)
- Lady Muriel: Lady Muriel Paget, Her Husband, and Her Philanthropic Work in Central and Eastern Europe (1962)
- Of Flowers & A Village: An Entertainment for Flower Lovers (Hamish Hamilton, 1963)
- Cockerell: Sydney Carlyle Cockerell, Friend of Ruskin and William Morris and Director of the Fitzwilliam Museum, Cambridge (1965)
- Isfahan, Pearl of Persia (1966, with Wim Swaan)
- Omar: A Fantasy for Animal Lovers (1966) illustrated by John Verney
- John Christie of Glyndebourne (1968)
- The Dream King: Ludwig of Bavaria (1970)
- The Compleat Naturalist: A Life of Linnaeus (Collins, 1971, with William T. Stearn)
- Captain Cook's Florilegium (1973, with W. T. Stearn)
- The Golden Road to Samarkand (1973)
- On Wings of Song: A Biography of Felix Mendelssohn (1974)
- England's Michelangelo: A Biography of George Frederic Watts (1975)
- The Australian Flower Paintings of Ferdinand Bauer (1976, with W. T. Stearn)
- The Ark in the Park: The Zoo in the Nineteenth Century (1976)
- Splendours of Islam (1976)
- In For a Penny: A Prospect of Kew Gardens (1978)
- The Illustrated Herbal (Frances Lincoln, 1979, with S. Raphael)
- Married to a Single Life: An Autobiography, 1901-1938 (1983)
- Slow on the Feather: Further Autobiography, 1938–1959 (1986)
