= Country Life (books) =

Country Life books are publications, mostly on English country houses and gardens, compiled from the articles and photographic archives of Country Life magazine, usually published in the UK by Aurum Press and in the USA by Rizzoli.

== Books (in reverse chronology) ==
From the Archives of Country Life:

- Country Life: 125 Years of Countryside Living in Great Britain (2023) John Goodall and Kate Green, Rizzoli International Publications, 400 pages, ISBN 0-8478-7315-3, ISBN 978-0-8478-7315-9.
- English House Style (2019) John Goodall, Rizzoli International Publications, 432 pages, ISBN 0-8478-6551-7, ISBN 978-0-8478-6551-2.
- Gertrude Jekyll and the Country House Garden (2011) Judith B. Tankard, Aurum Press, 192 pages, ISBN 1-84513-624-1, ISBN 978-1-84513-624-6. Rizzoli USA, ISBN 0-8478-3633-9, ISBN 978-0-8478-3633-8.
- The Classical Country House (2010) David Watkin, Aurum Press, 192 pages, ISBN 1-84513-593-8, ISBN 978-1-84513-593-5.
- The Victorian Country House (2009) Michael Hall, Aurum Press, 192 pages, ISBN 1-84513-457-5, ISBN 978-1-84513-457-0. USA: Lasting Elegance: English Country Houses 1830-1900, Monacelli Press, ISBN 1-58093-256-8, ISBN 978-1-58093-256-1.
- The English Country House (2009) Mary Miers, Rizzoli International Publications, 484 pages, ISBN 0-8478-3057-8, ISBN 978-0-8478-3057-2.
- Charles Latham's Gardens of Italy (2009) Helena Attlee, Aurum Press, 192 pages, ISBN 1-84513-432-X, ISBN 978-1-84513-432-7.
- The Country Houses of John Vanbrugh (2008) Jeremy Musson, Aurum Press, 192 pages, ISBN 1-84513-097-9, ISBN 978-1-84513-097-8.
- Country Houses of the Cotswolds (2008) Sir Nicholas Mander, Aurum Press, 192 pages, ISBN 1-84513-331-5, ISBN 978-1-84513-331-3.
- The Country Houses of Robert Adam (2007) Eileen Harris, Aurum Press, 192 pages, ISBN 1-84513-263-7, ISBN 978-1-84513-263-7.
- The Great Edwardian Gardens of Harold Peto (2007) Robin Whalley, Aurum Press, 192 pages, ISBN 1-84513-235-1, ISBN 978-1-84513-235-4.
- Villa Gardens of the Mediterranean (2006) Kathryn Bradley-Hole, Aurum Press, 208 pages, ISBN 1-84513-124-X, ISBN 978-1-84513-124-1.
- The Regency Country House (2005) John Martin Robinson, Aurum Press, 192 pages, ISBN 1-84513-053-7, ISBN 978-1-84513-053-4.
- English Gardens of the Twentieth Century (2005) Tim Richardson, Aurum Press, 224 pages, ISBN 1-84513-071-5, ISBN 978-1-84513-071-8.
- Twentieth Century Houses in Britain (2004) Alan Powers, Aurum Press, 192 pages, ISBN 1-84513-012-X, ISBN 978-1-84513-012-1.
- Lost Gardens of England (2004) Kathryn Bradley-Hole, Aurum Press, 192 pages, ISBN 1-85410-991-X, ISBN 978-1-85410-991-0.
- Edwin Lutyens: Country Houses (2001) Gavin Stamp, Aurum Press 192 pages, ISBN 1-85410-763-1, ISBN 978-1-85410-763-3.
- Hussey, Christopher (1967). English Gardens and Landscapes, 1700–1750.

== See also ==
- Country Life (magazine)
- Country House
