= Lindley Library =

UK horticultural library

Coordinates: 51°29′40″N 0°08′05″W

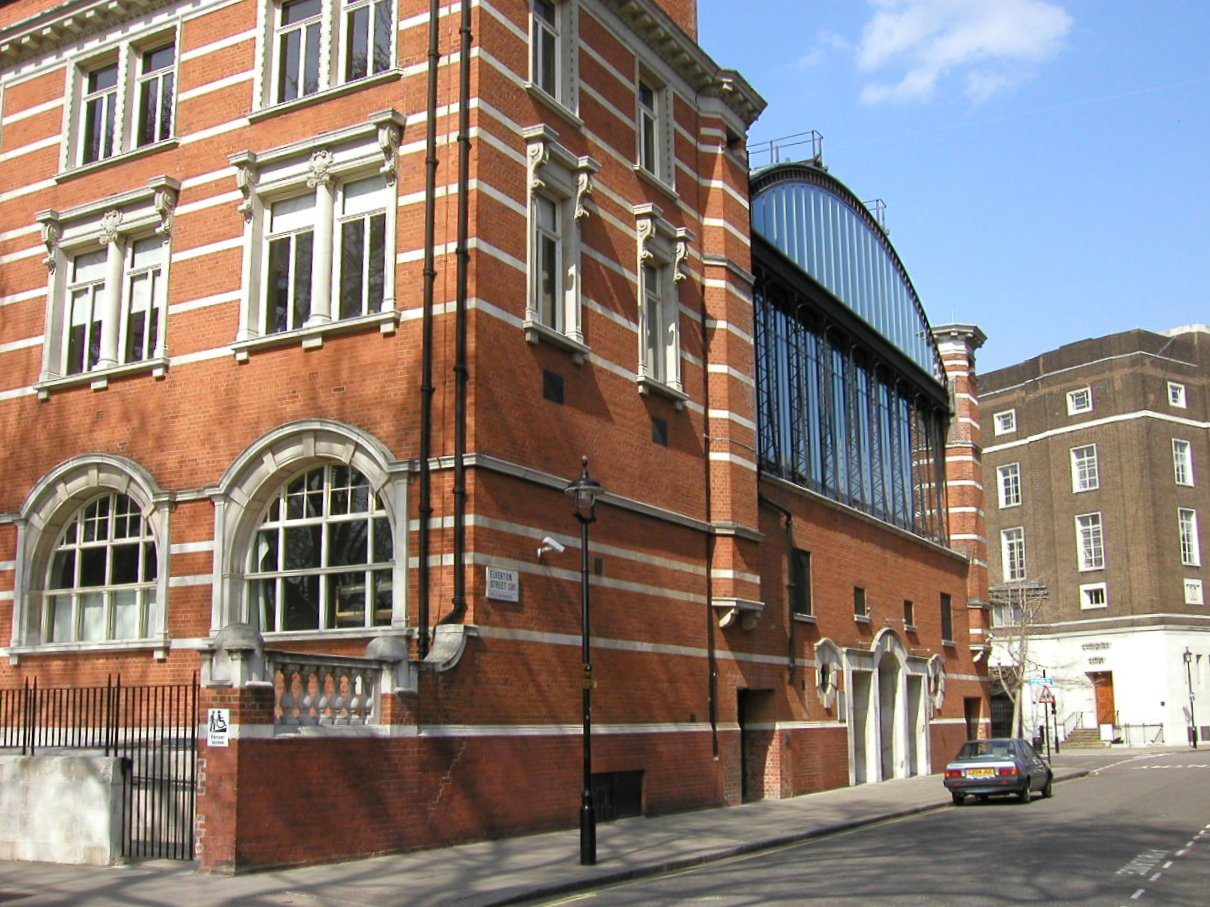
80 Vincent Square

The Lindley Library in London is the largest horticultural library in the world. It is within the headquarters of the Royal Horticultural Society.

== Library ==
The main part of the library is based at 80 Vincent Square, London, within the headquarters of its custodian, the Royal Horticultural Society (RHS); the site also includes Lindley Hall, one of the Royal Horticultural Halls. RHS members may borrow books from the London, Wisley and Harlow Carr collections.

The Upper Reading Room is open to the public and holds the 20th-century material available for loans, along with gardening magazines from around the world. Visitors must register if they wish to use the Lower Reading Room which houses historical collections.

In 1995, the RHS proposed to relocate the main collection from London to Wisley in Surrey, but architect Rick Mather redesigned the accommodation to make better use of the basement. His design was accepted and the project was carried out between 1997 and 2001. The Heritage Lottery Fund assisted the renovation with a grant, one condition of which was that the library should be opened up to public access.

The library is based upon the book collection of English botanist John Lindley and has many rare books dating from 1514. It also includes other media such as garden guidebooks, trade catalogues, postcards and press cuttings. As well as horticulture, the collection covers flora, birds and other related subjects. The London site also includes the RHS' collection of paintings and photographs. In 2009, the Library started issuing a series of papers (Occasional Papers).

The London collection suffered minor damage in a fire in July 2011. No valuable works were lost.

== Librarians ==
The first librarian was W. T. Thiselton-Dyer (1871–1875), later Director at Kew, followed by W. B. Hemsley (1875–1878). Amongst other notable librarians was William Thomas Stearn (1933–1952), who succeeded H. R. Hutchinson. More recently were Peter Stageman (1957) and Dr Brent Elliott, who was librarian (1982–2007), and subsequently the RHS historian. He initiated and edited the Occasional Papers.

== Bibliography ==
- Lucas, A. M. (April 2008). "Disposing of John Lindley's library and herbarium: the offer to Australia". Archives of Natural History. 35 (1): 15–70. doi:10.3366/E0260954108000053.
- "Dr Brent Elliott". Gresham College. 2013. Archived from the original on 30 December 2016.
- Elliott, Brent (December 2009). "The cultural heritage collections of the RHS Lindley Library". Occasional Papers from the RHS Lindley Library. 1. Archived from the original on 2017-01-06.
- RHS (2017). "Lindley Library Online". RHS. Archived from the original on 6 January 2017.
- HR Hutchinson (1927). The Lindley Library: Catalogue of Books, Pamphlets, Manuscripts and Drawings. RHS
