= Patrick Synge =

British botanist, writer and plant hunter

Patrick Millington Synge VMH (1910-1982) was a British botanist, writer and plant hunter.

== Career ==
He was a graduate of Corpus Christi College, Cambridge. He was a member of the Oxford University Expedition to Sarawak in 1932. His experiences during the British Museum Ruwenzori expedition of 1934-35 to East Africa, led by George Taylor, later Director at Royal Botanic Gardens, Kew are documented in his first book Mountains of the Moon. He fought in the Intelligence Corps in the Second World War between 1943 and 1945, gaining the rank of Major. He was editor of the Horticultural Journal between 1945 and 1970 and was awarded the Victoria Medal of the Royal Horticultural Society in 1971. His many expeditions, including those to Nepal with Colville Barclay and Turkey with Rear-Admiral Paul Furse were documented in his 1973 book In Search of Flowers. He died in 1982.

== Publications ==
- Mountains of the Moon: an expedition to the Equatorial Mountains of Africa. Drummond/Travel Book Club; Patrick M. Synge (1938)
- Great Flower Books, 1700-1900: a bibliographical record of two centuries of finely-illustrated flower books. London: Collins (1956), Sacheverell Sitwell & Wilfrid Blunt; bibliography by Patrick M. Synge
- --do.--Atlantic Monthly Press (1990) ISBN 0871132842
- Collins Guide to Bulbs. London: Collins. Patrick Millington Synge (1961) OL 20906759M
- Dictionary of Roses in Colour. London: Michael Joseph & Ebury Press, S. Millar Gault, Patrick M. Synge (1971) ISBN 0718109112
- In Search of Flowers. London: Michael Joseph, Patrick Millington Synge (1973)
- Flowers and Colour in Winter. London: Michael Joseph, Patrick M. Synge (1974)
- The Dictionary of Garden Plants in Colour. London: Michael Joseph, Patrick Millington Synge, Roy Hay (1976) ISBN 0198691165 abstract
- The Gardens of Britain; Vol. 1: Devon and Cornwall. London: B. T. Batsford in assoc. with Royal Horticultural Society. Patrick M. Synge (1977) ISBN 0-7134-0927-4
- Lilies: a revision of Elwes' Monograph of the Genus Lilium and its supplements. London: B. T. Batsford. Patrick M. Synge (1980) ISBN 9780713403930
- Borneo Jungle with Tom Harrisson et al.
- Plants with Personality
- A Diversity of Plants
- The Royal Horticultural Society Dictionary of Gardening and supplements; contributor

== Royal Horticultural Society accepted plant names ==
- Callianthe × 'Patrick Synge'
- Callianthe × 'Patrick Synge' variagated (v)
