= International Society for Horticultural Science =

The International Society for Horticultural Science (ISHS) is the world's leading independent organization of horticultural scientists. Its aim is "to promote and encourage research and education in all branches of horticultural science and to facilitate cooperation and knowledge transfer on a global scale through its symposia and congresses (International Horticultural Congress), publications and scientific structure." Membership is open to all interested researchers, educators, students and horticultural industry professionals.

The society dates from 1864, and was formally constituted in 1959. It is based in Leuven, Belgium, and is a founding member of the Global Horticultural Initiative. In 2008, it has over 7,000 members from about 150 countries.

The ISHS coordinates the distributed network of International Cultivar Registration Authorities, which are responsible for ensuring that the names of plant cultivars and cultivar groups are defined and not duplicated.

== Publications ==
These ISHS publications are standard works in the field of horticulture:

- Acta Horticulturae is a series of scientific technical publications, mainly the proceedings of ISHS Symposia and the ISHS International Horticultural Congress. All articles (over 42,000) are available online on a paid basis.
- Chronica Horticulturae is a quarterly publication sent to ISHS members and other subscribers. Unlike a scientific journal, it contains horticultural articles of interest to a broad audience of ISHS members and other professionals in science and industry. The full text of all issues is available for free download online.
- Scripta Horticulturae is a series of works devoted to specific horticultural issues such as position papers, crop or technology monographs, and special workshops or conferences. The full text of all articles since 1961 is available online on a paid basis.

== See also ==
- Horticultural society
- Horticultural botany
- Horticultural flora
- Horticultural taxonomy
