= Botanical Journal of the Linnean Society =

Peer-reviewed scientific journal

- Discipline: Plant sciences
- Language: English
- Edited by: Michael F. Fay

Publication details
- Publisher: Oxford University Press on behalf of the Linnean Society (UK)
- Frequency: Monthly
- Open access: To developing countries via AGORA; also upon payment of a fee by the author.
- Impact factor: 2.911 (2020)

Standard abbreviations
- ISO 4: Bot. J. Linn. Soc.

Indexing
- ISSN: 0024-4074

Links
- Journal homepage; Online access

The Botanical Journal of the Linnean Society is a scientific journal publishing original papers relating to the taxonomy of all plant groups and fungi, including anatomy, biosystematics, cytology, ecology, ethnobotany, electron microscopy, morphogenesis, palaeobotany, palynology and phytochemistry.

The journal is published by the Linnean Society of London and is available in both print and searchable online formats.

Like the Biological Journal of the Linnean Society (published since 1858), the journal evolved from the Society's original journal Transactions, which covered early papers by Darwin and Wallace, becoming an essential, contemporary publication for all those currently working in the field of botany.
