= Biological Journal of the Linnean Society =

- Discipline: Evolutionary Biology
- Language: English
- Edited by: John A. Allen

Publication details
- Publisher: Oxford University Press on behalf of the Linnean Society (United Kingdom)
- Frequency: Monthly
- Open access: Hybrid
- Impact factor: 1.961 (2019)

Standard abbreviations
- ISO 4: Biol. J. Linn. Soc.

Indexing
- CODEN: BJLSBG
- ISSN: 0024-4066

Links
- Journal homepage; Online access

The Biological Journal of the Linnean Society is a direct descendant of the oldest biological journal in the world, the Transactions of the Linnean Society. It succeeded the earlier title in 1969. The journal specializes in evolution, and encompasses work across all taxonomic groups in all five kingdoms of living organisms. It includes all methods, whole-organism or molecular, practical or theoretical.

The journal is published by the Linnean Society of London.
