= German School of Athens =

- Deutsche Schule Athen; Γερμανική Σχολή Αθηνών

Location
- Marousi; Greece
- Coordinates: 38.037°N 23.7943°E

Information
- Type: Private
- Established: 1896
- Enrollment: 1,100
- Website: http://www.dsathen.gr

The German School of Athens (German: Deutsche Schule Athen, DSA; Greek: Γερμανική Σχολή Αθηνών, ΓΣΑ), also known as the Dörpfeld Gymnasium, is a coeducational independent, kindergarten, elementary school and high school in Marousi, Athens, Greece.

The school has been in operation since 1896 and was founded by architect and archeologist Wilhelm Dörpfeld. It is one of the oldest and most prestigious private schools in Greece, after a very large number of students graduating from the school has excelled in politics, the arts, science and business.

While at kindergarten and elementary school level no differentiation of school systems is made, high school is currently split into a German section (with students eventually graduating with the German high school diploma) and a Greek section (with students graduating with German and optionally an additional Greek high school diploma). Pupils take entry exams in order to become students of the latter section so the school is considered highly selective.

However, the school is currently undergoing a transition phase towards a unitary high school system.

Upholding the tradition of an environment friendly school, the German School of Athens had Greece's largest solar roof installed before the 2004 Olympic Games. The project was backed by German Federal Ministry of Economics and Labor (BMWA), the German Energy Agency and the Greek-German Chamber of Commerce and Industry.

== School system ==
The term "German School of Athens" really describes a complex of one kindergarten, one elementary school and a "split" (or dual) high school. For admission to kindergarten and elementary school, both following the German educational system, prospective pupils need to have achieved a reasonable level of competence in German for their age in order to be able to follow classes taught exclusively in German. For them to be admitted, they thus have to sit a short test or be interviewed by a member of the teaching staff.

High school, or Gymnasium, at the DSA/ΓΣΑ is split, offering students a choice between the German and Greek section of the school: The German section follows a form of the German educational system optimised for German schools abroad, and pupils with no prior secondary education in Germany, at the DSA/ΓΣΑ itself, or at another German school sit a short test and/or are interviewed by the school principal to be admitted. This is to ensure they can easily follow lessons, which are held almost exclusively in German, with the exceptions of the following subjects: English Language, Greek Language and (Greek Orthodox) Religion. After their final year, students receive the German high school diploma (Abitur), formally "Allgemeine Hochschulreife" or "Reifeprüfung", and consequently often go on to study in Germany.

The Greek section of the "split" high school follows the Greek educational system, allowing students to sit for Greek university entrance exams (Panhellenics) and gain their Greek high school diploma (Apolytirion) while simultaneously preparing students for a form of the German high school diploma examinations formally known as "Ergänzungsprüfung", allowing them easy entry into German universities. Pupils have to take entry exams in order to become students of the Greek section of Gymnasium. Lessons are held in both Greek and German.

This duality of the separate sections has proven administratively challenging over the years. Therefore, the school is currently (2015/16) undergoing a transition phase towards a unitary high school system known as an "Integrierte Begegnungsschule", or "integrated communal school". Under this new regulation all high school students study towards a single degree, specially designed for German Schools abroad, the German International Abitur Examination (Deutsche Internationale Abiturprüfung, DIAP). Students are admitted to high school either after 4th grade (finishing German elementary school), or, having finished a Greek elementary school, after 6th grade; the latter are required to sit written and possibly oral entry examinations focused on (German) language competence. Lessons are held in both Greek and German (apart from foreign-language lessons English and French) for all students. However, instead of a one-size-fits-all model or splitting into sections, the school offers different "language profiles" for different students, allowing students to choose between curricula with a low (1), medium (2) or high (E) number of lessons taught in Greek. Those choosing the latter (E), will still have the option of sitting Panhellenic (Greek university entry) examinations. The first students to study under this new system will enter 5th and 6th grade in 2015/16 and graduate in 2020/21.

Teaching staff at the DSA/ΓΣΑ are usually recruited from Germany for a period between 3 and 8 years, but a significant proportion of teachers have chosen to permanently live in Athens.

== DSAMUN conference ==
The German School of Athens is known for its DSAMUN (Deutsche Schule Athen Model United Nations) conference. The conference is affiliated by THIMUN (The Hague International Model United Nations) and this makes DSAMUN conference one of the best conferences in the World.

The DSAMUN is a three-day-long simulation of the work of the United Nations and takes place at the GSA campus. It is designed for secondary school students and is intended to provide an occasion for the participants to discuss world issues. The conference gives them the opportunity to experience the work of the United Nations and to get to know the world of diplomacy.

The delegates at the DSAMUN conference are asked to prepare drafts resolutions and policy statements on various issues (from the view of the country they represent) and learn to negotiate and debate in a formal way. Foreign students, who attend DSAMUN, have the opportunity to visit Plaka, the National Museum, the Acropolis and other places of interest in Athens. In addition, excursions to Epidaurus and Nafplion are organized.

== Dörpfeldianer Ball ==
The Dörpfeldianer Ball for graduates takes place every two years at the Hotel Athenaeum Intercontinental. It draws together people from the fields of politics, diplomacy, business, journalism and the academic world. The highlight of the Dörpfeldianer Ball is the debut of the 'débutantes' (female graduating students of the school) in dances like waltz and polka. The tradition of the débutantes signifies the step into adulthood and social life. The dress code is formal.

== Drama Groups ==
The German School of Athens has at various times had between one and three drama groups staging plays in both the Greek, German and English language. These are classified as extracurricular activities or AGs (short for the German term "Arbeitsgemeinschaften"). While the English- and German language drama groups have been led by different members of the teaching staff over the years, and were periodically not offered as AGs, the Greek Drama Group had been consistently led by Mr. Stelios Papapetrou who in 2010 passed his experience and knowledge to Mrs. Elena Karakouli, the group's current leader. In the year 2010 the group celebrated its 30th anniversary, a time during which it had been awarded many times by theatre organisations in Greece. Most of the props and stage sets for the various plays are provided by the school's art department, particularly the Art and Stage Sets Group. Additionally, 20 graduates of the DSA/ΓΣΑ and former members of the school theatrical group are professional actors, such as Alexandra Pavlidou and Thalia Matika.

== Greek Music Group ==
The German School of Athens also has a Greek music group. The Group has been led for 15 years or more by philologists and musicians Dr. Giannis Mangidis and Dr. Theo Mangidis. Seven years ago Dr. Angelos Tylios, another philologist and musician, also joined the Group. The three teachers collaborate on stage with many students, who are either musicians or singers and they perform in front of the whole school more than 5 times per year. The group's best moment so far was the performance at Greek Music House (Megaro Mousikis) in 2005 for the celebration of the School's 110th birthday.

== Extracurricular activities ==
Extracurricular activities offered at the DSA/ΓΣΑ include:

- Greek, German and English drama groups
- an Art and Stage Sets Group
- two orchestras and a chamber ensemble
- two choirs
- a Rock-Band
- a Model United Nations group
- debating, history, and chess clubs
- as well as 25 sports groups, among them dancing, swimming, badminton, table-tennis and various kinds of team sport

== Special events ==
- DSA Open Day
- Projects
- Model United Nations conferences
- European Youth Parliament
- Educational trips to Germany
- Exchange programs and participation in European educational programs in the Netherlands, Ireland, Turkey, Egypt and at various times also Germany, Austria, and Finland.
- rock, Christmas and spring concerts by students and staff
- plays staged by one of the drama groups

== Notable alumni ==
- Kostas Axelos (1924–2010), Greek philosopher
- Panagiotis Pikramenos, Judge and President of the State Court, announced as caretaker prime minister of Greece on 16 May 2012
- Dora Bakoyannis, former Greek Minister for Foreign Affairs, outgoing Mayor of Athens and winner of the 2005 World Mayor Award
- Giannis Valinakis, former Greek Deputy Foreign Affairs Minister, former president of Hellenic Foundation for European and Foreign Policy
- Georgios Rallis, former prime minister of Greece
- Yannis Papathanasiou, former Greek Deputy Minister of Economy and Finance
- Christos Verelis, former Greek Minister for Transport and Communications
- Niki Goulandris, Deputy President of The Goulandris Museum of Natural History
- Dimitrios Droutsas, former Greek Minister for Foreign Affairs
- Nikos Perakis, film director
- Kostas Sommer, actor
- Mariana Efstratiou, singer and twice contestant at the Eurovision Song Contest
