= Nicholas Yatromanolakis =

Greek politician and political scientist

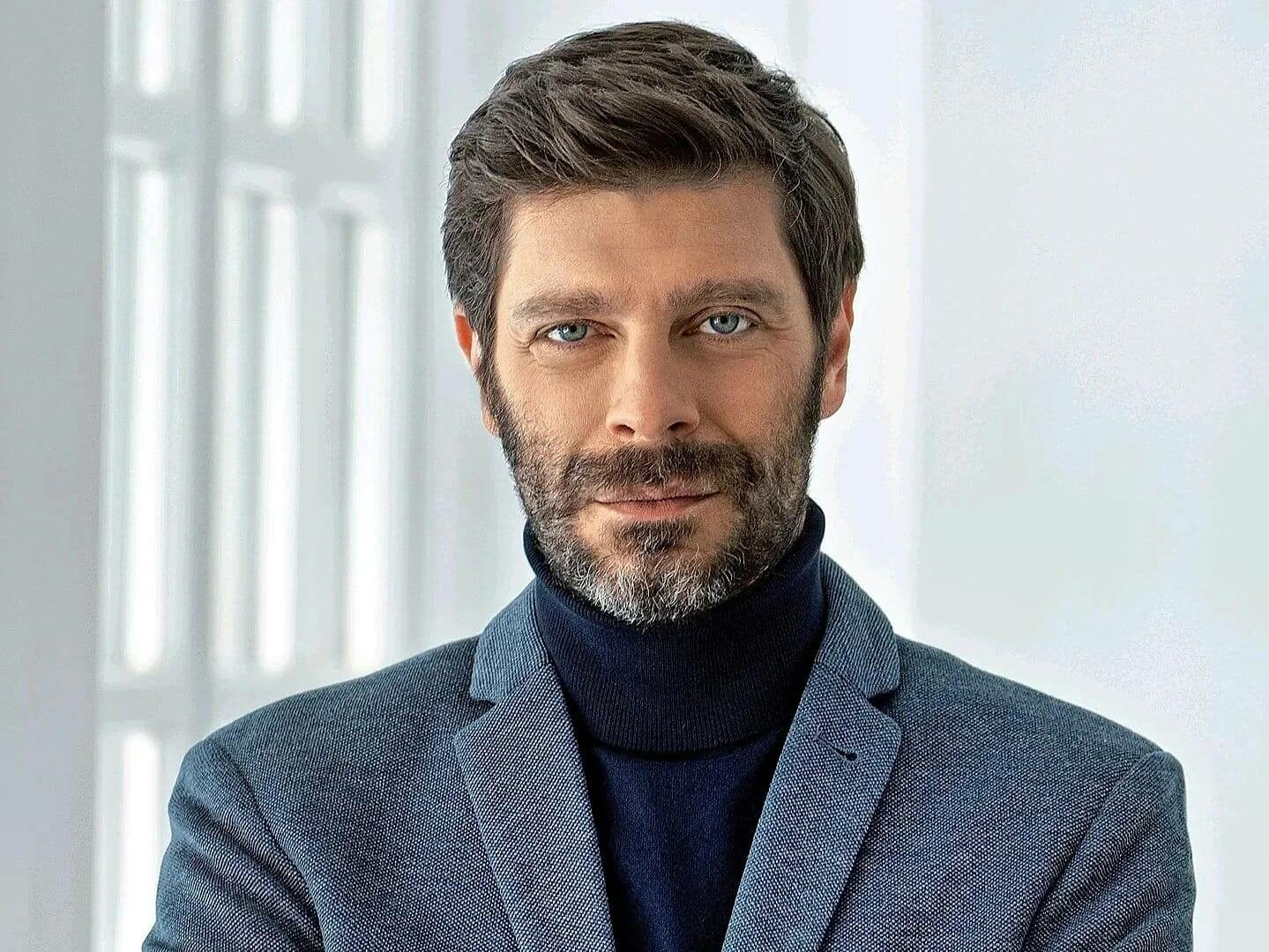

Deputy Minister of Culture and Sports
- In office 4 January 2021 – 26 May 2023
- Prime Minister: Kyriakos Mitsotakis
- Minister: Lina Mendoni

Personal details
- Born: 17 March 1975 (age 51) Athens, Greece
- Education: Panteion University (BA); Harvard University (MPP)
- Website: yatromanolakis.gr

Nicholas Yatromanolakis (Greek: Νικόλας Γιατρομανωλάκης, born: 1975) is a Greek politician and political scientist who served as Deputy Minister of Culture and Sports of Greece, responsible for contemporary appointed by Kyriakos Mitsotakis from 2021 to 2023. Prior to that, he served as the General Secretary for Contemporary Culture from 2019 to 2021. He is the first openly LGBT person to hold a ministerial position in Greece.

== Early life and education ==
Nicholas Yatromanolakis was born in Athens, Greece in March, 1975. His father is the writer and academic Yorgis Yatromanolakis and his mother Rena Lecanidou, also an academic. He hold a bachelor's degree in International Relations and Political Science from Panteion University and a Master's in Public Administration (MPP) from John F. Kennedy School of Government of Harvard University in the United States.

== Professional career ==
From January 2017 until July 2019, he held the position of the CMO of the Stavros Niarchos Foundation Cultural Center. In the past he had worked as a senior executive in Greek and multinational companies such as Microsoft, V+O Communication, S&B Industrial Minerals and the TV station Alpha TV, as well as at the Hellenic Foundation for European & Foreign Policy (ELIAMEP) and Harvard University, but also as an independent consultant for strategy, corporate affairs and communication. His work has been awarded in Greece and abroad. In 2013 he was selected as a Marshall Memorial Fellow. In 2019 he was elected a member of the Board of Directors of the Harvard Club of Greece.

Among other publications, he has co-edited the book New Approaches to Balkan Studies and has contributed in the Global Competitiveness Report 2001 edition of the World Economic Forum. He was the scientific editor of the Greek edition of NATO Handbook, and the head of publications of ELIAMEP in 1996–98.

== Political career ==
He was a founding member and member of the Political Planning Committee in Potami and he was the party's campaign manager for the European elections in 2014, while in the parliamentary elections in January 2015. He was ranked second in votes in A 'Athens electoral district. He left the party in 2016.

He has been active in the field of human rights and in particular the rights of LGBT+ people, and has participated voluntarily in non-profit organizations for the social inclusion of vulnerable populations, and the physical and mental health of children. He is gay.

=== Political positions ===
From the 1st of August 2019, he assumed the duties of General Secretary of Contemporary Culture in the government of Kyriakos Mitsotakis. He is the first to hold this office, as this General Secretariat did not exist before.

In the reshuffle of January 4, 2021, he took over as Deputy Minister of Culture for Contemporary Culture in the government of Kyriakos Mitsotakis. Again, he is the first to hold this office, as this position did not exist before.
