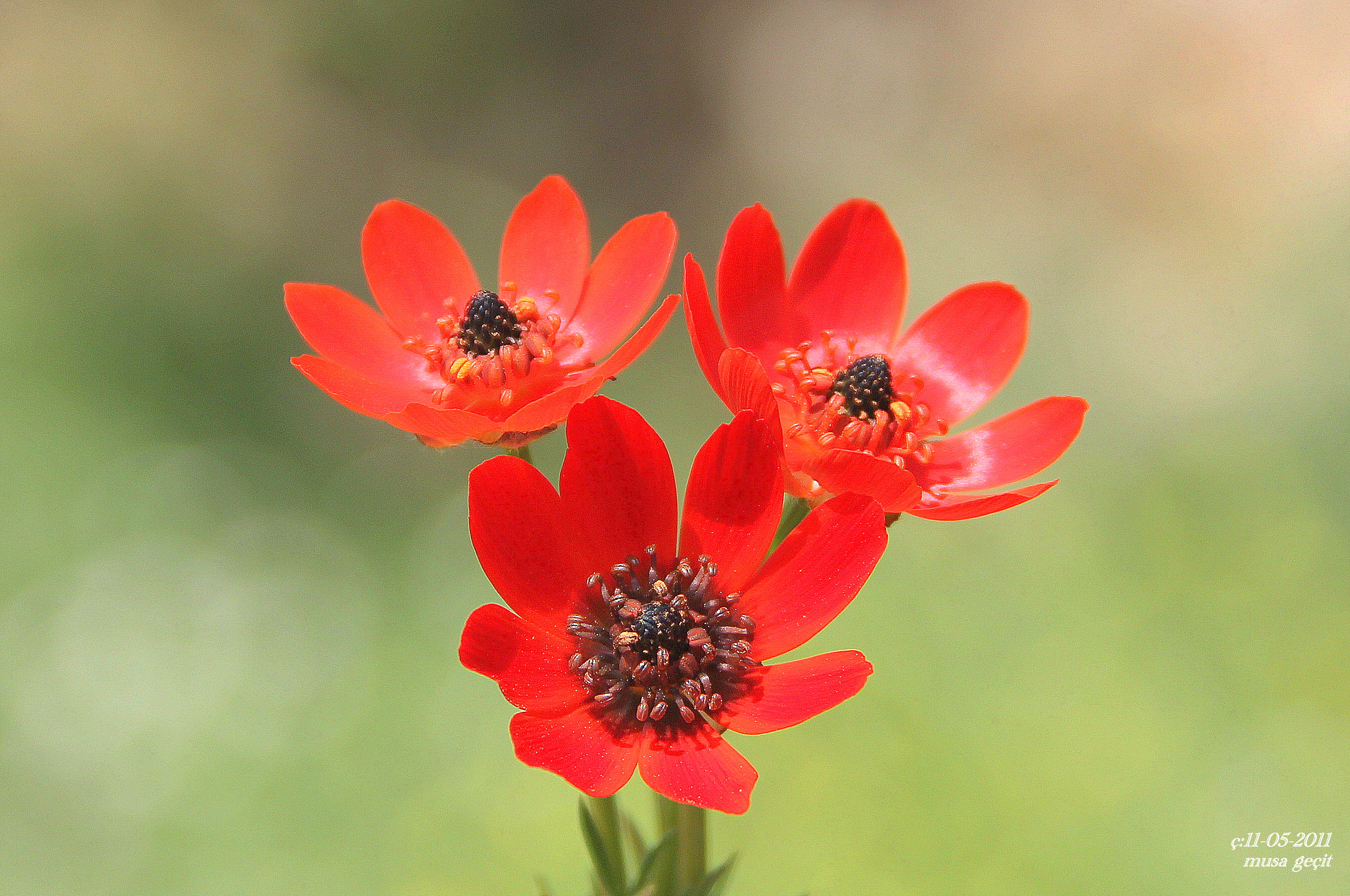
- Adonis flammea in Mardin, Turkey

Scientific classification
- Kingdom: Plantae
- Clade: Tracheophytes
- Clade: Angiosperms
- Clade: Eudicots
- Order: Ranunculales
- Family: Ranunculaceae
- Genus: Adonis
- Species: A. flammea

Binomial name
- Adonis flammea Jacq.

= Adonis flammea =

Species of plant

Adonis flammea, large pheasant's eye, is a species of plant belonging to the family Ranunculaceae.

== Description ==
The plant is similar to Adonis annua but is more robust with large flowers, 2–3 cm in diameter, usually with narrow and oblong petals, dark scarlet sepals that are attached to the petals. It can be distinguished by its mottled black achenes having a rounded bulge just below the peak. It blooms in spring and summer.

== Distribution and habitat ==
Calcareous fields in the Anatolia, the Levant Central and Southern Europe.

== Taxonomy ==
Adonis flammea, was described by Nikolaus Joseph von Jacquin and published in Florae Austriaceae 4: 29, in the year 1776.

=== Etymology ===
Adonis : according to Stearn's Dictionary of Plant Names, the genus names derives from the Adonis, a Greek deity: "The flower is supposed to have sprung from the blood of Adonis who was gored to death by a wild boar. He was beloved of Aphrodite and by some accounts was unsuccessfully wooed by her. Adonis was regarded by the Greeks as the god of plants. It was believed that he disappeared into the earth in autumn and winter only to reappear in spring and summer. To celebrate his return, the Greeks adopted the Semitic custom of making Adonis gardens, consisting of clay pots of quickly growing seeds."

Flammea :Latin epithet that means "flame-like".

=== Cytology ===
Chromosome number of Adonis flammea (Fam. Ranunculaceae) and infraspecific taxa: n = 16.

=== Synonymy ===
- Adonis anomala Wallr.
- Adonis caudata Steven
- Adonis flammea var. Anomala (Wallr.) Beck
- Adonis flammea subsp. Cortiana C.Steinb.
- Adonis flammea var. Cortiana (CHSteinb.) WTWang
- Adonis flammea var. Polypetala Lange
- Adonis flammea subsp. Polypetala (Lange) CHSteinb.
- Adonis involucrata S.Pons
