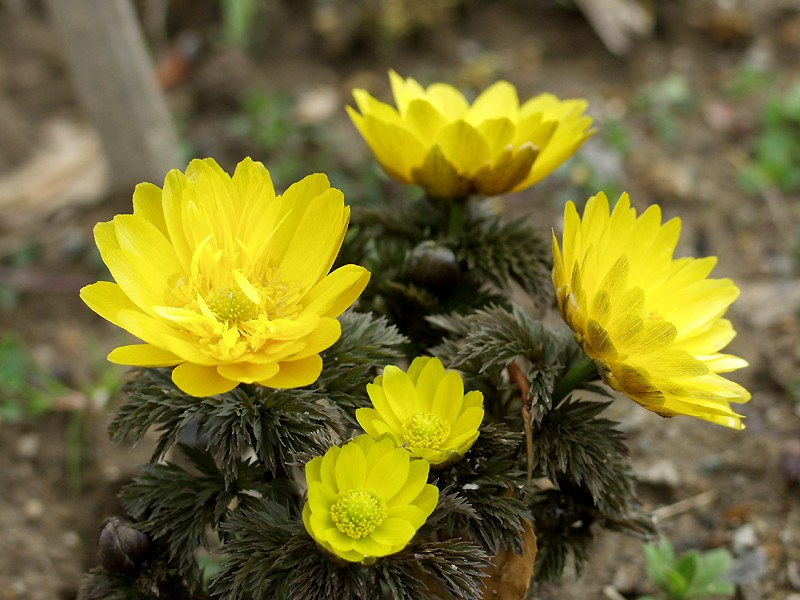

Scientific classification
- Kingdom: Plantae
- Clade: Tracheophytes
- Clade: Angiosperms
- Clade: Eudicots
- Order: Ranunculales
- Family: Ranunculaceae
- Genus: Adonis
- Species: A. amurensis

Binomial name
- Adonis amurensis Regel & Radde

= Adonis amurensis =

Species of flowering plant

Adonis amurensis, commonly known as Amur adonis and pheasant's eye, is a perennial plant with a golden yellow flower belonging to the Ranunculales order, and native to China (Heilongjiang, Jilin, Liaoning), Japan (Hokkaido), Korea, and Russian Far East (Primorye, Amur, Sakhalin). The Japanese name Fukujusō means fortune-longevity-plant.
