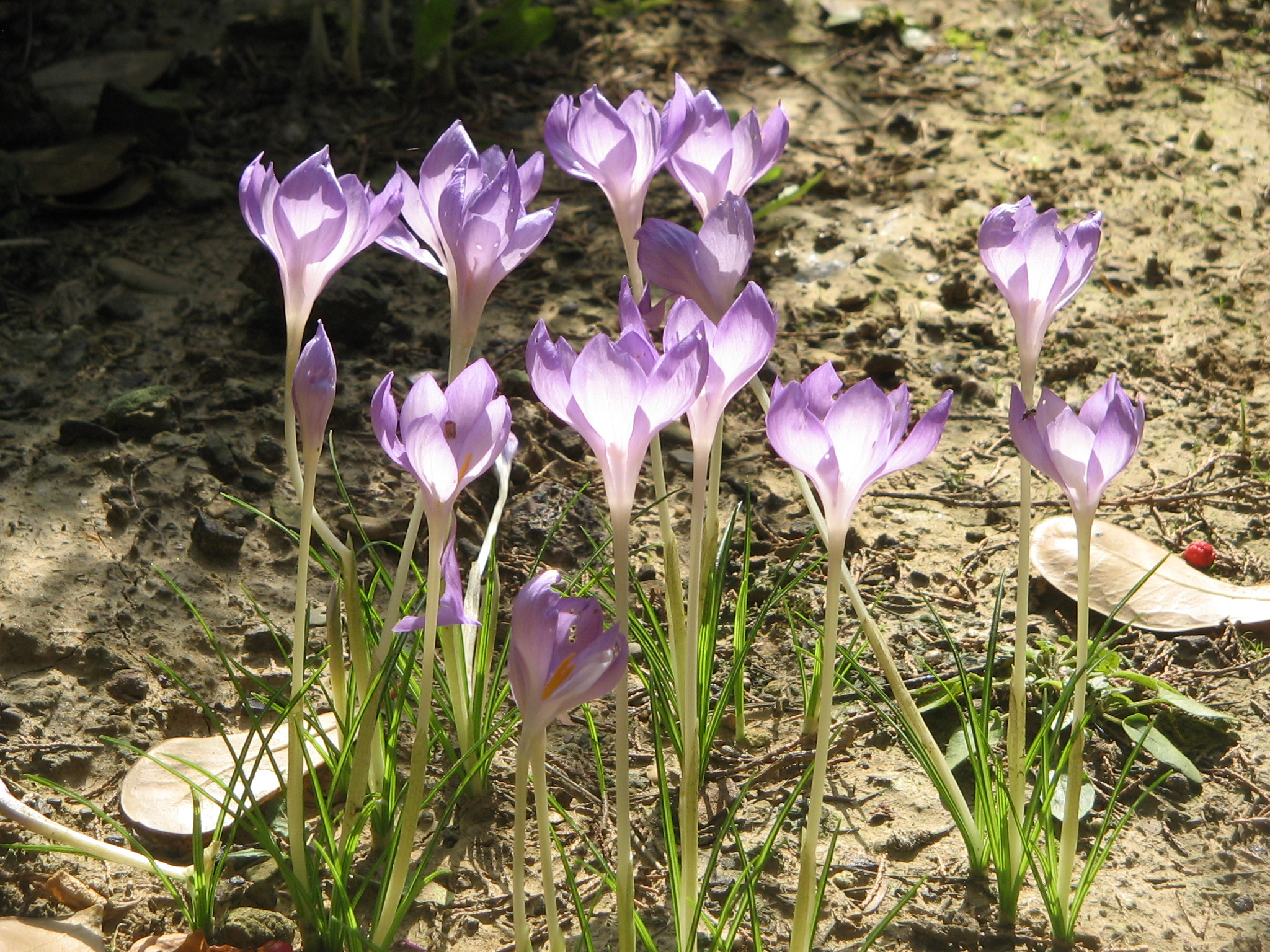

Scientific classification
- Kingdom: Plantae
- Clade: Tracheophytes
- Clade: Angiosperms
- Clade: Monocots
- Order: Asparagales
- Family: Iridaceae
- Genus: Crocus
- Species: C. goulimyi

Binomial name
- Crocus goulimyi Turrill

= Crocus goulimyi =

Species of flowering plant

Crocus goulimyi, the fall crocus, is a species of flowering plant in the genus Crocus and the family Iridaceae. It is endemic to Greece. It is a cormous perennial growing to 10 cm (3.9 in) tall. The small, rounded, lilac flowers with paler throats appear in autumn.

It was named in honour of the Greek amateur botanist Constantine Goulimis (1886-1963).

This plant and the cultivar C. goulimyi subsp. goulimyi 'Mani White' have gained the Royal Horticultural Society's Award of Garden Merit.
