= Giannis Valinakis =

Greek politician and university professor

Giannis Valinakis Γιάννης Βαληνάκης Professor
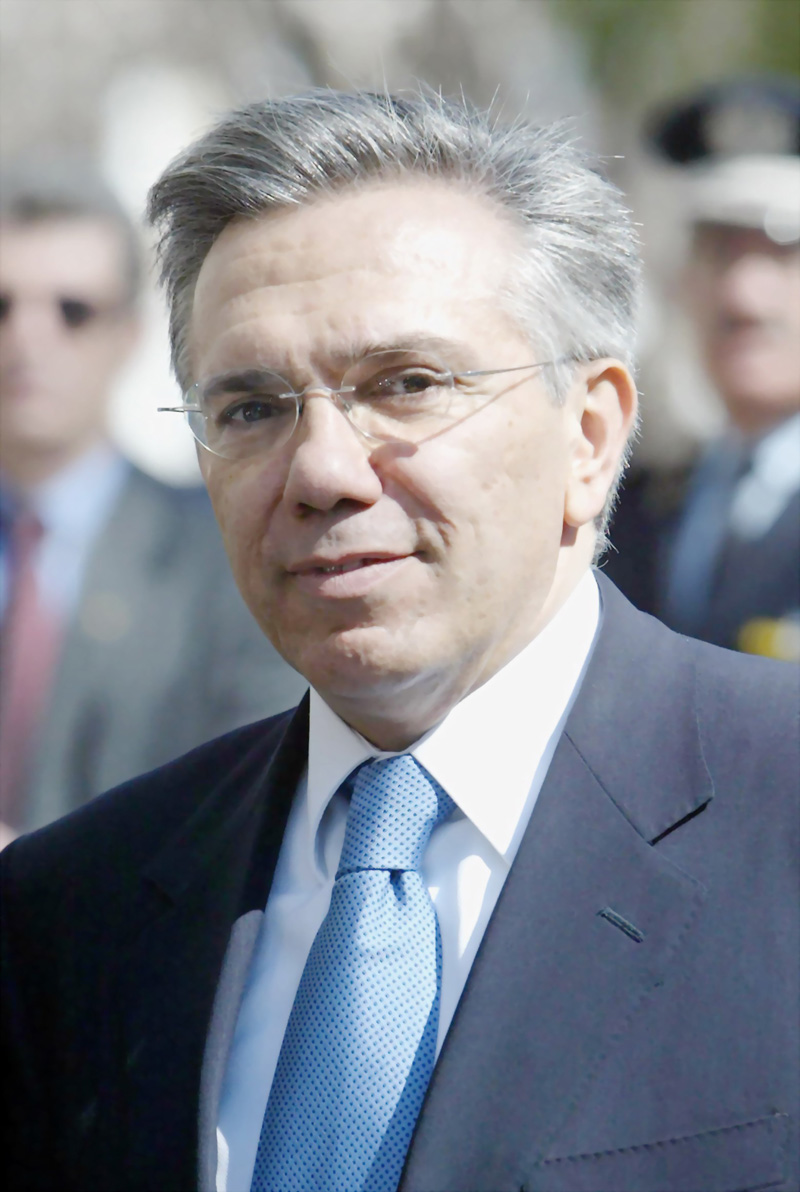
- Giannis Valinakis, former Greek Deputy Minister of Foreign Affairs

Former Deputy Minister of Foreign Affairs of Greece and MP
- In office March 10, 2004 – September 11, 2009

Personal details
- Born: May 31, 1955 (age 71) Athens, Greece
- Party: New Democracy
- Spouse: Christina Charatsari
- Children: 1
- Occupation: President of the Jean Monnet European Centre of Excellence at the University of Athens
- Website: http://www.valinakis.gr/

Giannis Valinakis (also Yannis Valinakis) is a Greek politician and university professor. He is the former Greek Deputy Minister of Foreign Affairs. He is currently President of the Jean Monnet European Centre of Excellence at the University of Athens, Jean Monnet Professor ad Personam, and a member of the Executive Board of the Centre for European Studies in Brussels.

Valinakis was born in Athens in 1955. After graduating from the German School of Athens, he studied at the Athens Law School and University of Heidelberg's School of Political Science. Valinakis completed post-graduate studies in international politics, defense policy, and international relations at the Sorbonne. He has worked as a researcher at Greek and foreign institutes. In 1992 he became a professor of international relations at the University of Athens. Valinakis was president of the Hellenic Foundation for European and Foreign Policy (ELIAMEP), after serving as assistant director of research, director of research, and director-general.

In May 2003, Valinakis was appointed New Democracy's out-of-parliament representative on the National Council for Foreign Policy. In 2009, he made an official visit to the United States to attend events organized by the Greek-American community marking the 61st anniversary of the Dodecanese islands’ unification with Greece.

Valinakis is married to Christina Haratsari, a lawyer.

== Academic career ==
Born in Athens in 1955, Valinakis studied law at the University of Athens and political science at the University of Heidelberg. He completed his postgraduate studies at the University of Sorbonne - Paris I (DEA in International Politics, DEA in Defense Policy, DEA in History of International Relations) and received his Ph.D. (with honours) from the same university, in 1981. He became an assistant professor at the University of Thrace Law School in 1983, professor of international relations at Athens University in 1992, Jean Monnet Professor in European Diplomacy in 1996, dean of the Law School at Neapolis University, and Jean Monnet Professor Ad Personam in 2013.

Valinakis has taught at the National Defense School, the Centre for Diplomatic Studies, the National School of Public Administration, and at various Greek and foreign universities. He has published widely in five languages in the fields of European and International affairs and Strategic Studies. His major works are: Exiting the Crisis; Realistic Proposals, Papazisis Publ., Athens: 2014; Greece's European Policy Making, London: Hellenic Observatory European Institute 2012; Greek Foreign and European Policy, Athens: Sideris 2010; International Relations and Strategy in the Nuclear Age, Thessaloniki: Paratiritis 2001; The Black Sea Region: Challenges and Opportunities for Europe, Paris: Western European Union Institute for Security Studies, 1999; Greece's Security Policy in the Post Cold War Era, Ebenhausen, Stiftung Wissenschaft und Politik, 1994, etc.

He is fluent in English, French, and German and has a working knowledge of Spanish, Italian, and Russian.

== Research-related positions ==
Valinakis served as director-general (1990–1998) of the Hellenic Foundation for European and Foreign Policy (ELIAMEP) and director-general of the Jean Monnet European Centre of Excellence (2000–2004). He worked as a resident fellow at the Institute for East-West Studies in New York (1982–1983), as senior fellow at the Institute for Security Studies of the European Union (Paris 1997–1998), visiting senior fellow at the European Institute (London School of Economics (2011–2012), and other prominent research institutions.

He has also worked as a senior consultant to international organizations (such as the EU, the WEU, and BSEC) and to Greek and other governmental bodies. He has also served as a member of international Commissions. He is a member of the International Committee of Experts of Fondation Chirac in Paris (since 2011) and a member of the editorial board of the European View journal (since 2005).

Valinakis was a member of the planning staff at the Greek Ministry of Foreign Affairs (1991–93) and he served as an advisor to the Greek Minister of Foreign Affairs (1983–86).

== Political career ==
Valinakis also followed a political career for more than a decade. First in the opposition, as Advisor in European and International Affairs to the Nea Demokratia Party leader K. Karamanlis, and as Secretary of International Relations and European Affairs of this Party (1998-2004). He was also elected member of the Political Bureau of the European People's Party (EPP), member of the Executive Committee of the European Democrat Union (EDU), and member of the Executive Committee of the International Democrat Union (IDU).

After the national election of 2004, he became Deputy Minister of Foreign Affairs (2004-2009), responsible for Political and European Affairs, and Member of Parliament (for the Dodecanese Region, 2007–2009). As Deputy Minister, he served as Greece's chief negotiator in all major European multilateral negotiations, including on the European Constitutional and (later on) Lisbon Treaty (2004-2008), the EU 2007-2013 Budget, and the Union's enlargement negotiations.

In his ministerial capacity, Valinakis participated in more than 40 EU ministerial meetings (GAERC - General Affairs and External Relations Council) and in more than 40 Ministerial Meetings of the NATO, The Council of Europe, OSCE, Black Sea Cooperation Council, southeast European Cooperation Process, Mediterranean Forum; he substituted for the Foreign Minister or the Prime Minister in a large number of Ministerial/ Heads of State-Government Euro-Mediterranean, EU-GCC, EU-Asia, EU-ASEAN, EU-Latin America, EU-Africa and Southeast European Cooperation Process Meetings.

As Minister, Valinakis also initiated the “Olive Group” (and participated in more than ten informal ministerial Meetings of the EU's 12 Mediterranean Member-States; he co-initiated the Group of 18 like-minded countries in the framework of the Financial Perspectives 2007-2013 negotiation, Meetings of the European Affairs Ministers on EU Maritime Policy, the informal Group Friends of the German Presidency to support efforts towards a new EU Treaty, etc. He also participated in more than 20 ministerial Meetings of European Affairs on Communicating Europe. Finally, he negotiated and signed on Greece's behalf the Accession Treaties to the EU of Bulgaria and Romania and several SAA Agreements of the Union.

== Recognition ==
- Wilfried Martens Centre for European Studies, Member of the Honorary Board

== Decorations and Distinctions ==
In 2013 Valinakis was honored by the European Commission with Jean Monnet Programme Chair ad Personam, in 1995 with the Jean Monnet Chair in European Diplomacy and in 2000 and in 2010 with the Jean Monnet Centre of Excellence. Yannis Valinakis also holds numerous international state decorations (including by the Federal Republic of Germany, Italy, China, Denmark, Norway etc.) and distinctions.

== Published works ==
- International Relations and Strategy (2001)
- Greek Defence Strategy-Aims and Means (2000)
- The Black Sea Region: Challenges and Opportunities for Europe (1999)
- Vision and Action: A Foreign Policy for Greece (1998)
- Greece's Security in the Post-Cold War Era (Ebenhausen, 1994)
- The New European Security Architecture (1991)
- International Negotiations (1989)
- Nuclear Strategy and European Security (1984)
