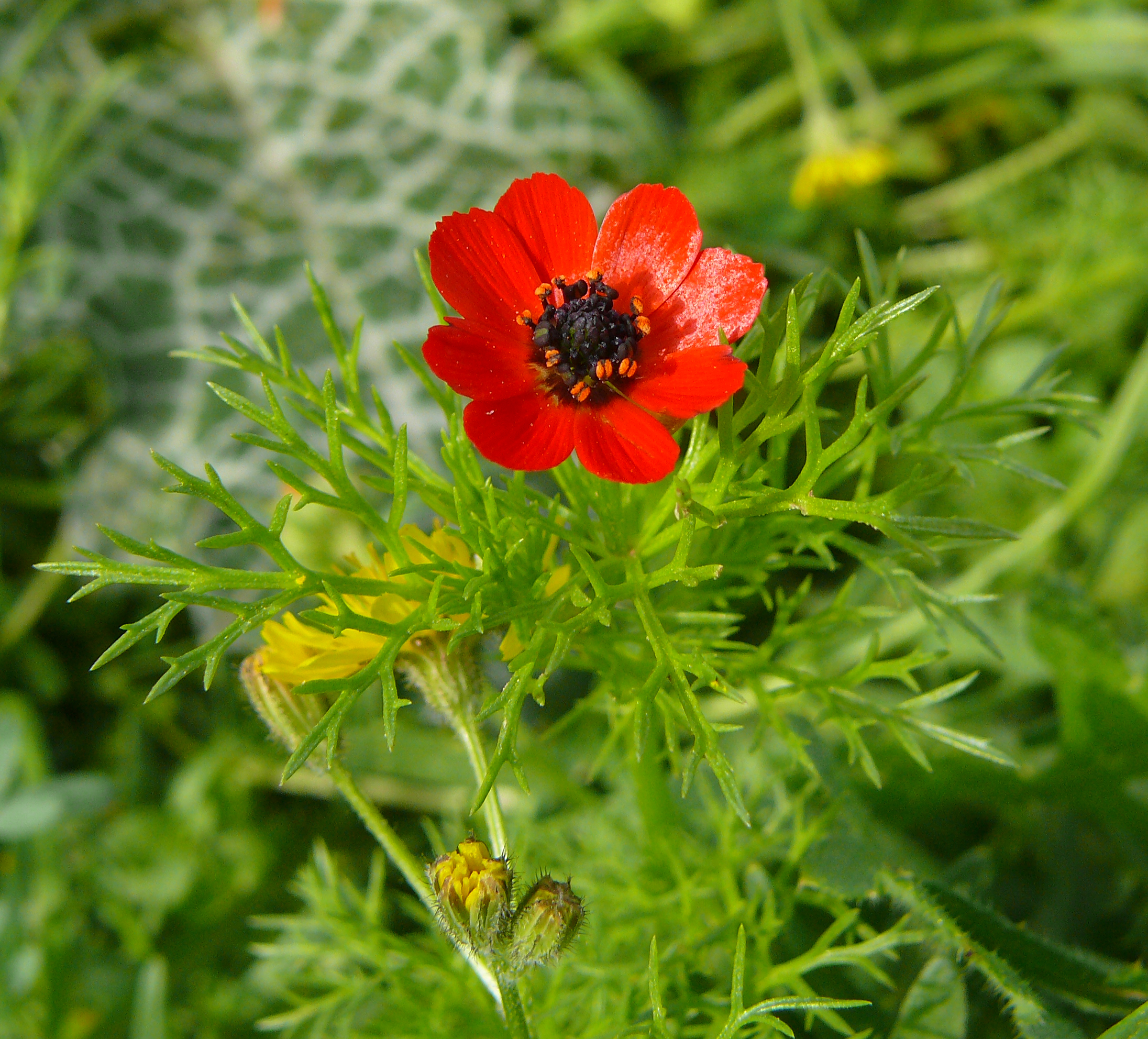

Scientific classification
- Kingdom: Plantae
- Clade: Tracheophytes
- Clade: Angiosperms
- Clade: Eudicots
- Order: Ranunculales
- Family: Ranunculaceae
- Genus: Adonis
- Species: A. microcarpa

Binomial name
- Adonis microcarpa DC.

= Adonis microcarpa =

Species of flowering plant

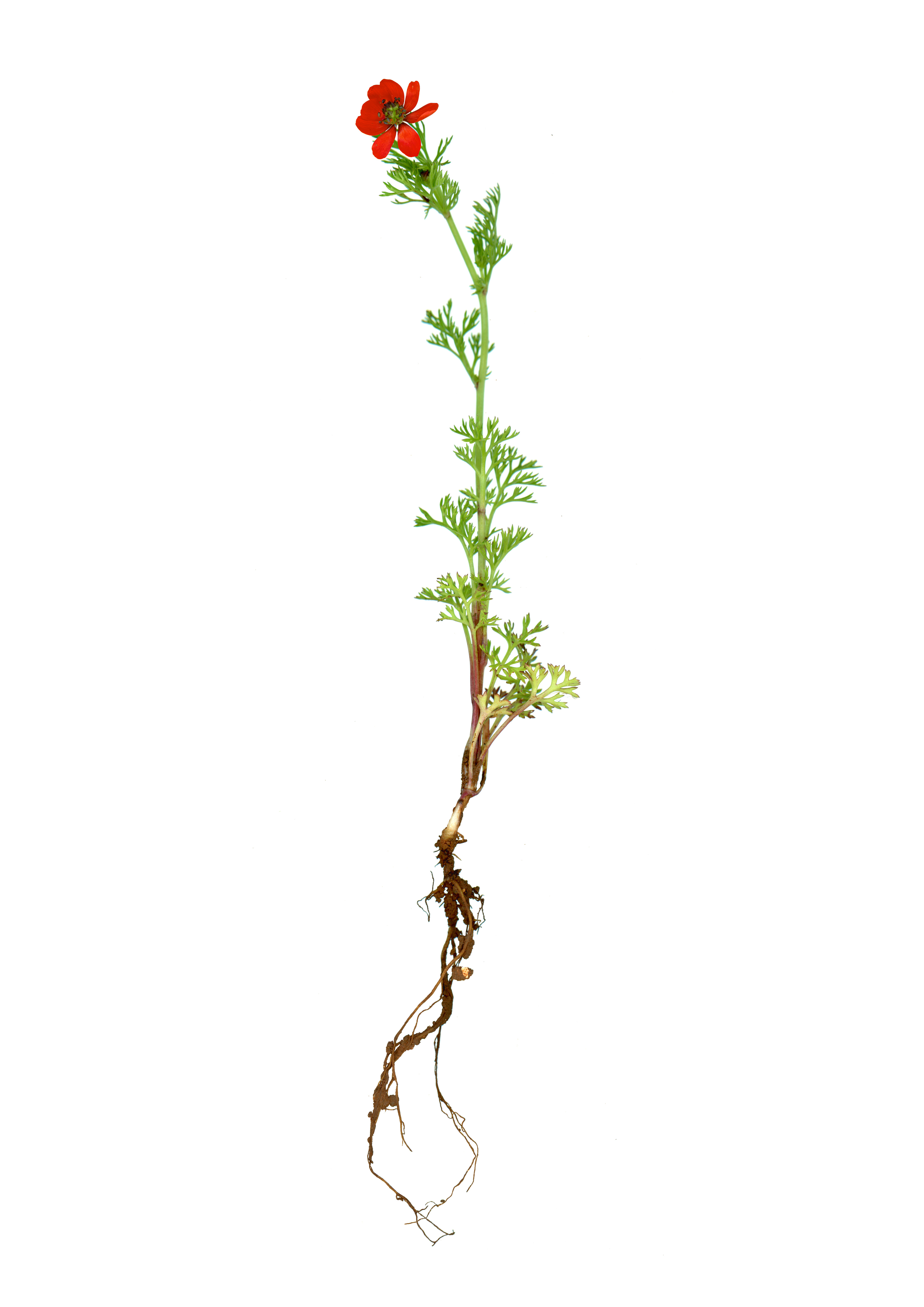
Adonis microcarpa

Adonis microcarpa, commonly known as small-fruit pheasant's-eye or red chamomile, is an annual herbaceous plant. The species is native to western Asia and southern Europe and is naturalised in Australia. It grows to 50 cm high, has finely divided foliage and red flowers with black centres.
