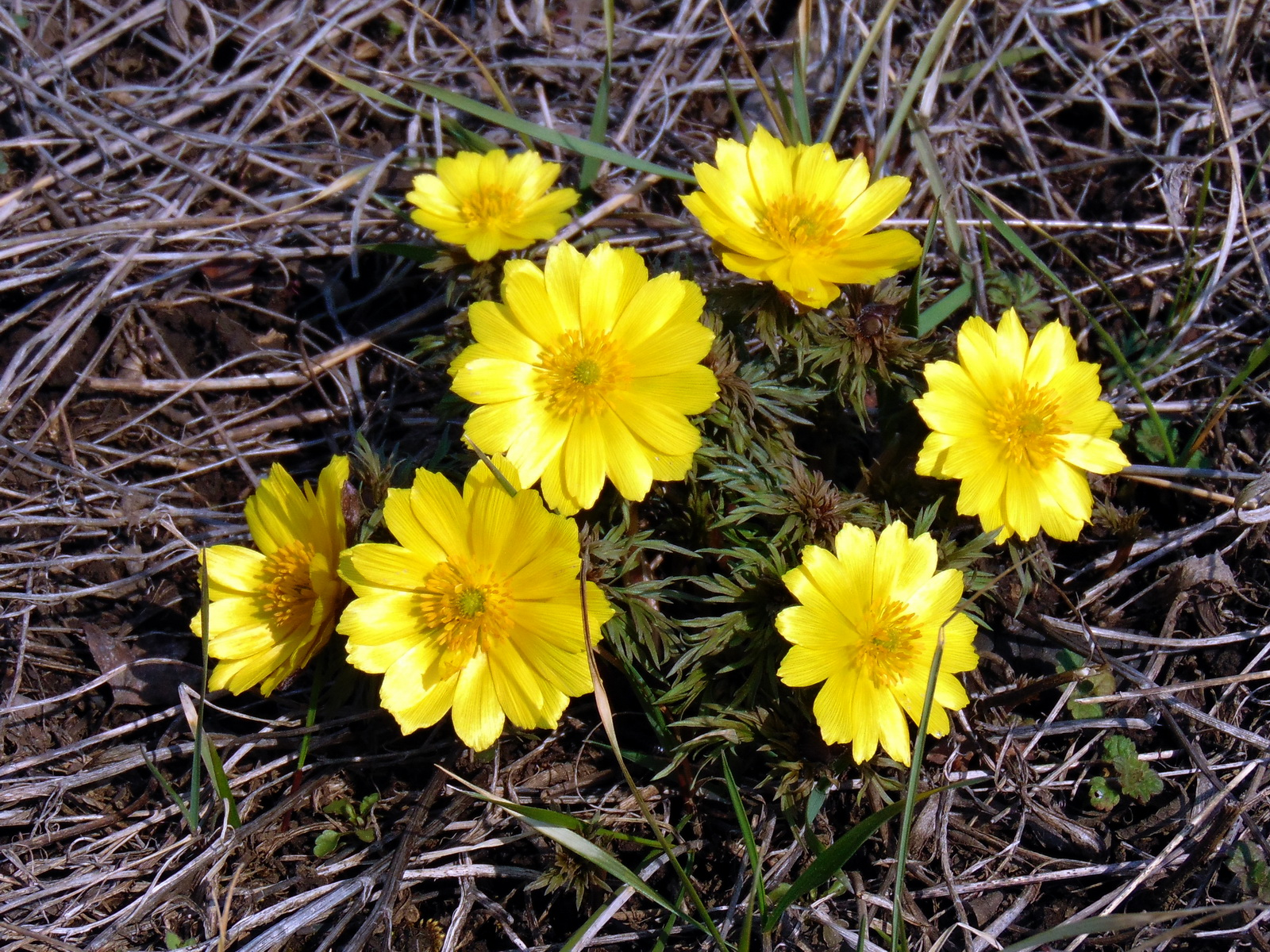

Scientific classification
- Kingdom: Plantae
- Clade: Tracheophytes
- Clade: Angiosperms
- Clade: Eudicots
- Order: Ranunculales
- Family: Ranunculaceae
- Genus: Adonis
- Species: A. volgensis

Binomial name
- Adonis volgensis Steven ex DC.

= Adonis volgensis =

Species of flowering plant

Adonis volgensis is a perennial plant with a yellow flower. It is found from southeastern Hungary through Romania eastward to the southern part of the Western Siberian Plain and Central Asia.
