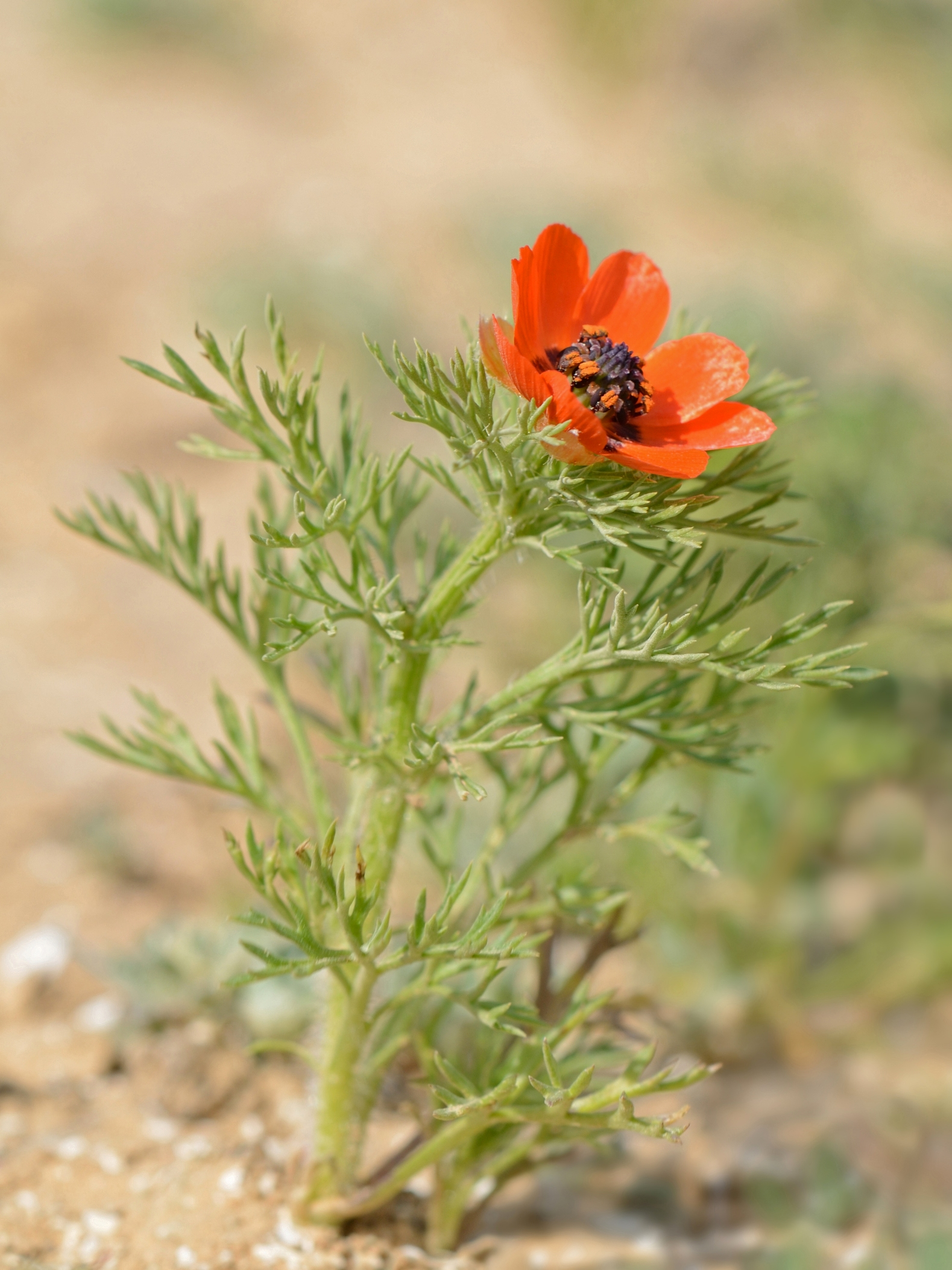
- Adonis aestivalis

Scientific classification
- Kingdom: Plantae
- Clade: Tracheophytes
- Clade: Angiosperms
- Clade: Eudicots
- Order: Ranunculales
- Family: Ranunculaceae
- Genus: Adonis
- Species: A. aestivalis

Binomial name
- Adonis aestivalis L.

= Adonis aestivalis =

Species of plant

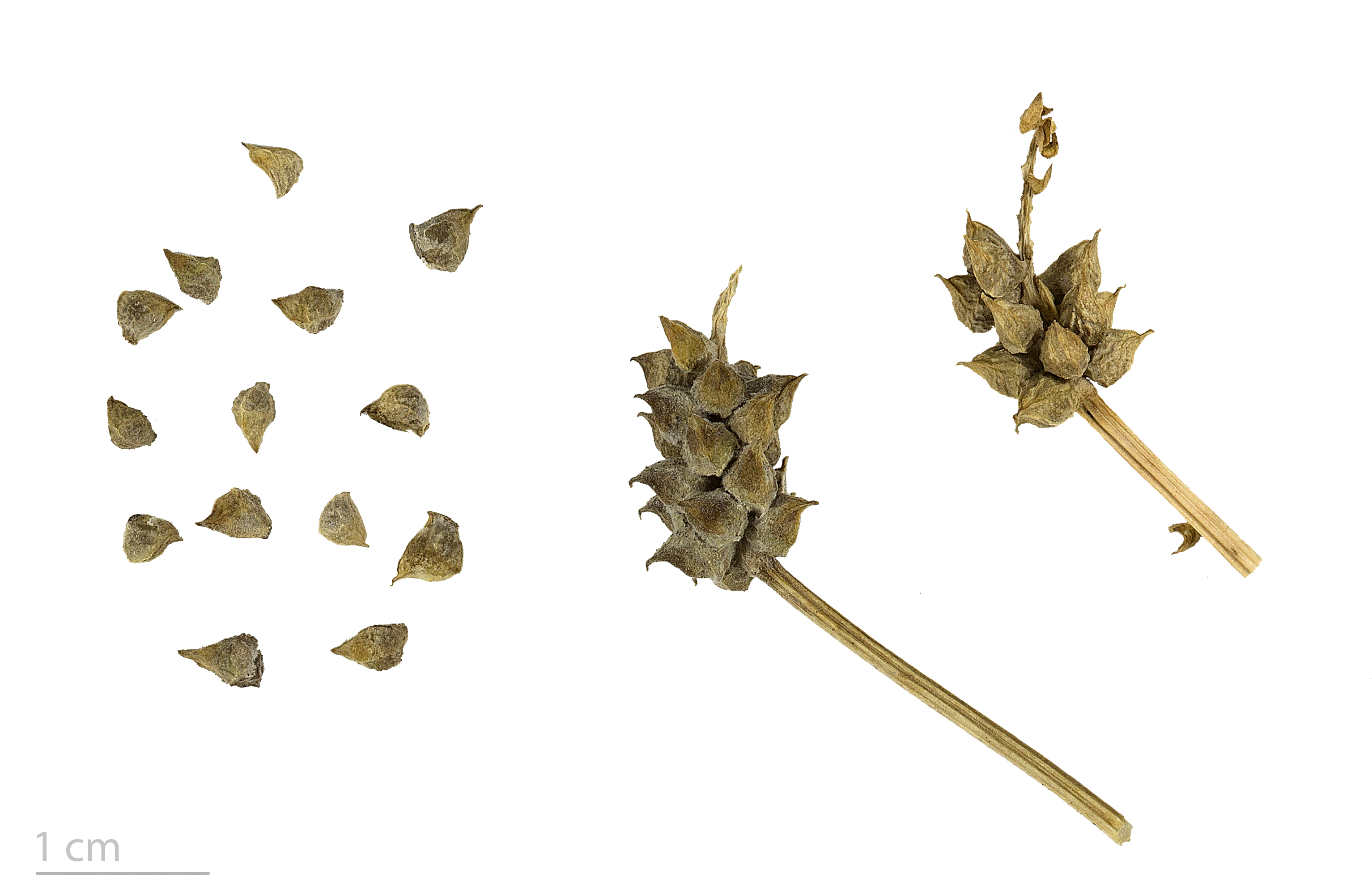
Adonis aestivalis – MHNT

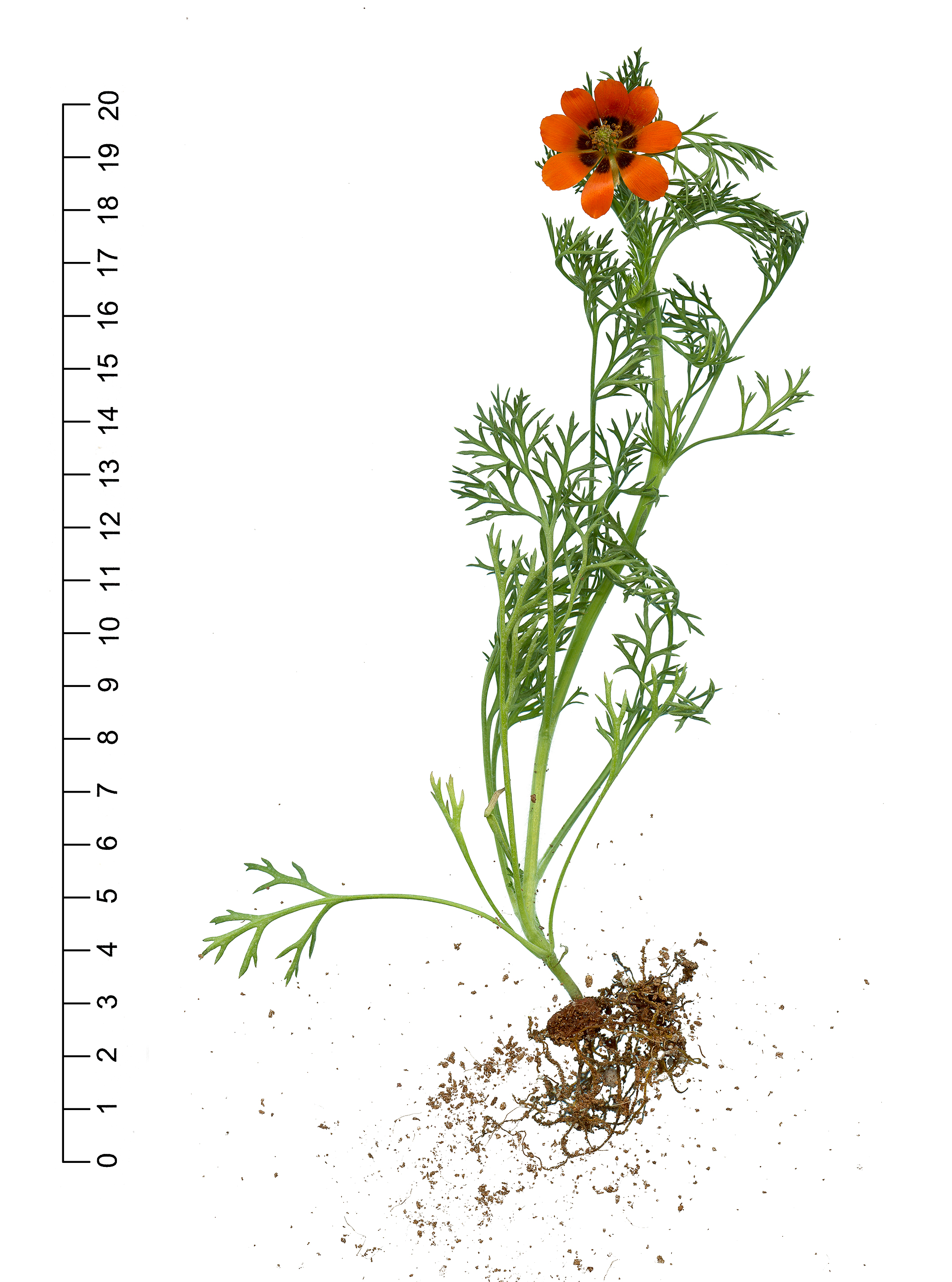

Adonis aestivalis, the summer pheasant's-eye, is a medicinal and ornamental plant. It is native to Europe and Asia but has been introduced elsewhere, such as the western and eastern parts of the United States, as an ornamental plant. In particular, it has been known to invade alfalfa fields, contaminating feed used for horse hay. It is a member of the buttercup family. It is an annual herb.

== Etymology ==
The genus name, Adonis, comes from a tale in Greek mythology. Aphrodite is said to have turned her lover, Adonis, into a plant with red flowers after his death. The specific epithet, aestivalis, is derived from Latin and means "pertaining to the summer".

== Description ==
It is an annual herb that grows up 1m (roughly 3 feet) tall. The stems are erect with simple, pinnately-dissected, alternate leaves and a small, terminal flower. The radially symmetrical flowers are an orange to red colour, and each petal has a black splotch at its base. Its petals curl to form a cup-like shape. The fruit is an achene. A single flower can produce 50 to 100 seeds.

== Uses ==
=== Medicinal Uses ===
A. aestivalis has been used in European folk medicine to treat weak hearts by stimulating cardiac activity. The plant is dried out and combined with some water to form a tonic. It can be toxic at large doses, causing paralysis of the heart muscles. It is also used to treat coughs and spasms and as a diuretic and sleeping aid. It has also been used in Iran to treat rheumatism and heart disease.

It is used in the homeopathic community as a remedy for heart and kidney diseases.

=== Fish feed ===
The flowers contain a pigment called astaxanthin, which gives the plant its blood-red colour. The pigment may extracted from the flower and added to fish feed. This results in an accumulation of the red pigment in the flesh and skin of the fish, giving it a reddish colour that is palatable to consumers. However, if the entire flower is used, as opposed to just the extract, mortality may occur due to the toxic compounds present. The exact toxic mechanisms have yet to be studied.

== Toxicity ==
=== In humans ===
Toxicity in humans is rarely reported or studied. Toxicosis is rare in humans because it is unlikely to accumulate in the body, further, A. aestivalis contains lower levels of cardiac glycosides than other members of the Adonis genus, so toxicosis is very unlikely to occur as a result of consumption. Toxicity may result in gastrointestinal symptoms such as diarrhea and vomiting. In extreme cases, this plant can excite nerves in the heart and increase arterial tension, later resulting in paralysis of the heart muscles and, consequently, death may occur.

=== In livestock ===
Typically, A. aestivalis is not consumed by livestock as it is unpalatable and feed contaminated with the plant is usually refused. Toxicity results in gastrointestinal symptoms, cardiac arrhythmias, and death. However, poisoning of livestock may be more common as it contaminates the fields harvested for hay and other animal feed.

Though cases are rare, toxicity has been reported in various livestock. A study examining horses after eating contaminated hay showed that the horses exhibited varying symptoms, ranging from gastrointestinal symptoms, lethargy, dehydration, and muscle tremors. However, most of the horses refused to eat the hay and did not suffer symptoms of A. aestivalis toxicity. In a small. acute-toxicity study with ewes, no clinical signs or life-threatening symptoms were observed but the long-term effects are unclear. Similarly, a small, acute-toxicity study with calves did not show life threatening symptoms but minor cardiac abnormalities and gastrointestinal issues were observed.

== Toxicology ==
Like other members of the Adonis genus, this species contains cardenolides, a class of cardiac glycosides. Cardiac glycosides are used to treat various heart diseases.

== Subspecies ==
Subspecies include:

- Adonis aestivalis ssp. aestivalis
- Adonis aestivalis ssp. marginata
- Adonis aestivalis ssp. parviflora
- Adonis aestivalis ssp. squarrosa
