= Niki Goulandris =

Greek philanthropist and painter (1925–2019)

Niki Goulandris (Greek: Νίκη Γουλανδρή; 1925 – 9 February 2019) was a Greek philanthropist and botanical painter. She co-founded the Goulandris Naturial History Museum in 1965, and was deputy minister for social services and secretary of state of health. She was awarded the UNEP Global 500 Award and named Woman of Europe by the European Commission.

== Early life ==
Born Niki Kephala, she married Angelos Goulandris, of the wealthy ship-owning Goulandris family, with whom she established the Goulandris Natural History Museum in 1965.

After graduating from the German School of Athens, Niki Goulandris studied political science and economics at the University of Athens and continued with post-graduate studies in political science and philosophy at the University of Frankfurt under the philosophers Theodor W. Adorno and Max Horkheimer. She spoke French, German, and English fluently.

Goulandris was a botanical painter, learning to paint in Edinburgh, and painted about 800 plants in her lifetime. Her paintings helped illustrate several botanical books, such as Wild Flowers of Greece by C. Goulimis and W.T. Stearn, and Peonies of Greece by Stearn and P.H. Davies. An exhibition of her peony paintings was shown at the American Museum of Natural History in 1984.

Goulandris was vice president of the Goulandris Natural History Museum and Goulandris Museum of Cycladic Art, former deputy minister for Social Services (1974–75), former Secretary of State for health in Greece (1974), honorary deputy president of Hellenic Radio and Television (1975–80), and a member of the World Commission on Culture and Development of UNESCO. She served as the President of the Save the Children Foundation in Greece. She was the winner of the United Nations Environmental Programme (UNEP) Global 500 Award in 1990, and in 1991 was named Woman of Europe by the European Commission, European Parliament, and European Movement. She was also appointed an officer of the French Legion of Honneur and awarded the Order of Honor by the Federal Republic of Germany.

She died on 9 February 2019 in Athens, aged 94.

== Bibliography ==
- Goulimis, Constantine; Stearn, William T. (1968). Wild Flowers of Greece. Illustrated by Niki Goulandris. Athens: Goulandris Natural History Museum.
- Stearn, W. T.; Davis, P. H. (1984). Peonies of Greece: A Taxonomic and Historical Survey of the Genus Paeonia in Greece. Illustrated by Niki Goulandris. Athens: Goulandris Natural History Museum. ISBN 978-0-565-00975-5.
- Haines, Catherine M. C. (2001). "Goulandris, Niki. née Kephalia. 1925– Botanical artist, Conservationist". International Women in Science: A Biographical Dictionary to 1950. Santa Barbara CA: ABC-CLIO. p. 116. ISBN 9781576070901.
