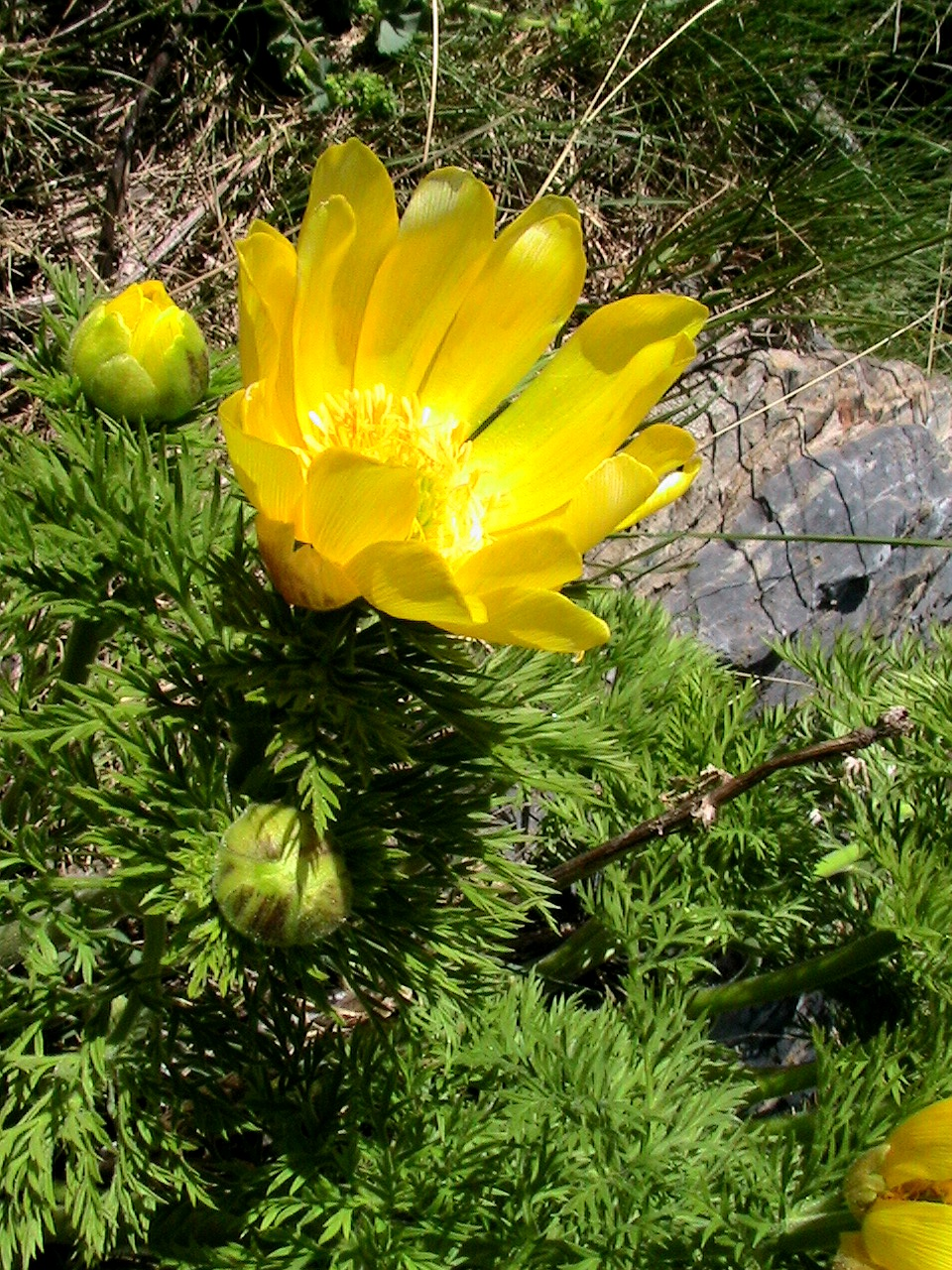

Scientific classification
- Kingdom: Plantae
- Clade: Tracheophytes
- Clade: Angiosperms
- Clade: Eudicots
- Order: Ranunculales
- Family: Ranunculaceae
- Genus: Adonis
- Species: A. pyrenaica

Binomial name
- Adonis pyrenaica DC.

Synonyms
- Adonanthe apennina (L.) A N. Sennikov; Adonanthe pyrenaica Spach; Adonis alpina Rouy et Fouc.; Adonis apennina Schouw ex DC.; Chrysocyathus pyrenaicus (DC.) Chrtek & Slaviková; Cosmarium pyrenaicum Dulac

= Adonis pyrenaica =

Species of flowering plant

Adonis pyrenaica, common name Pyrenean pheasant's eye, is a species of plant in the family Ranunculaceae.

== Distribution ==
This very rare species is a native plant of the Pyrenees and the Cantabrian Mountains in southwestern Europe. One station is present in the Maritime Alps of southeast France. It is also cultivated as an ornamental plant.

== Habitat ==
These orophyte plants prefer rocky mountains, with calcareous or sometimes siliceous scree and stony lawns with discontinuous vegetation, at an elevation of 1,300–2,400 metres (4,300–7,900 ft) above sea level.

== Description ==
Adonis pyrenaica has an erect and a little pubescent stem, forming thick tufts measuring approximately 10–30 centimetres (3.9–11.8 in). Leaves of this plant are alternate, the lower ones have a long petiole. The plant produces inflorescences showing from one to three yellow flowers, with petals of about 1–1.5 centimetres (0.39–0.59 in). The yellow sepals may be glabrous or slightly hairy. Corolla can reach a width of 5–7 centimetres (2.0–2.8 in) and it is composed of 10 to 15 obovate petals. Stamens have yellow anthers. The fruits are in the form of achenes of 6–7 mm, from glabrous to densely pubescent.

== Biology ==
This perennial herbaceous plant is hermaphrodite. It blooms from June to July and it is pollinated by insects (entomophily), where as seeds are disseminated by the animals.

== Gallery ==
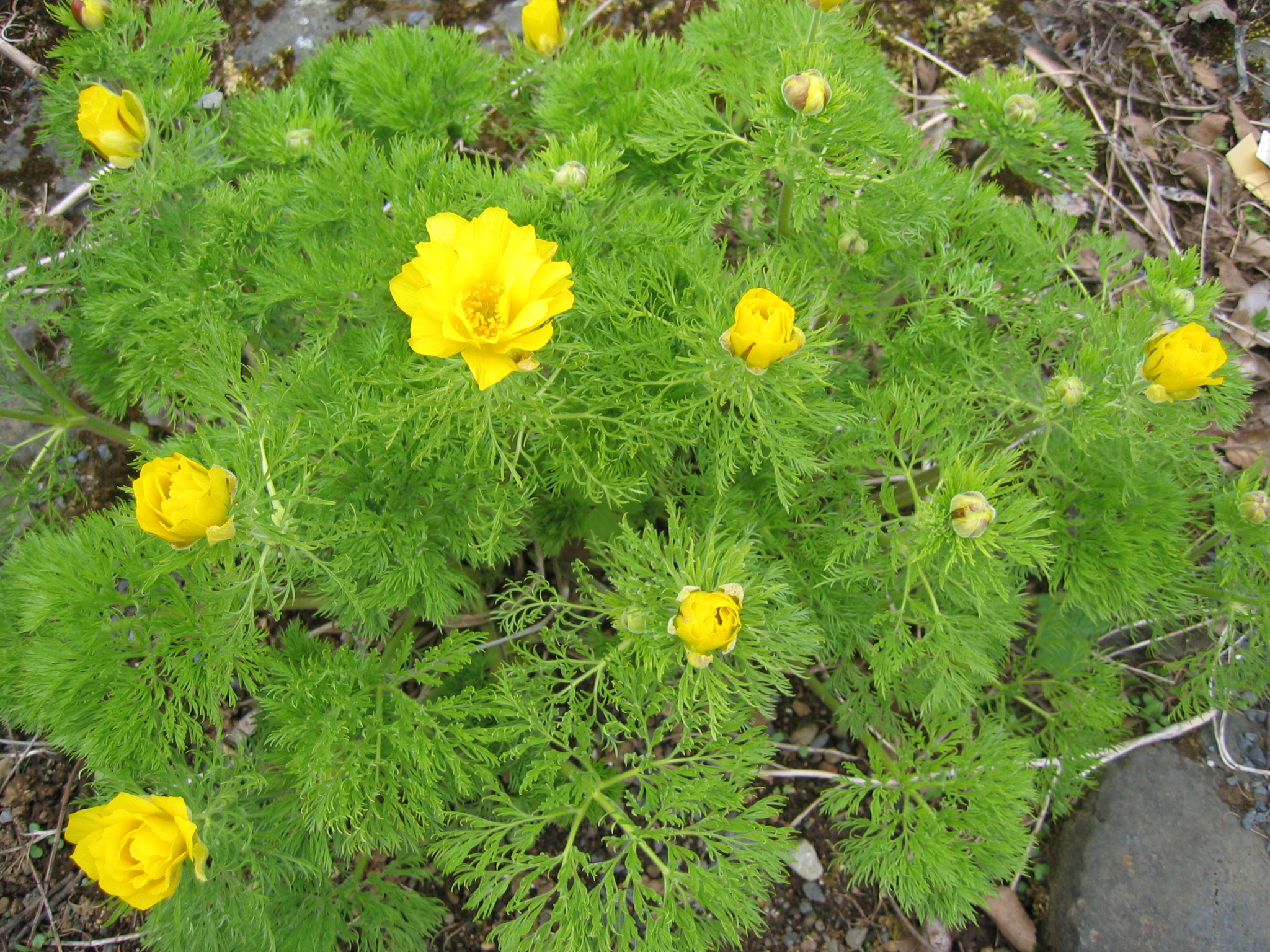
Plant of Adonis pyrenaica

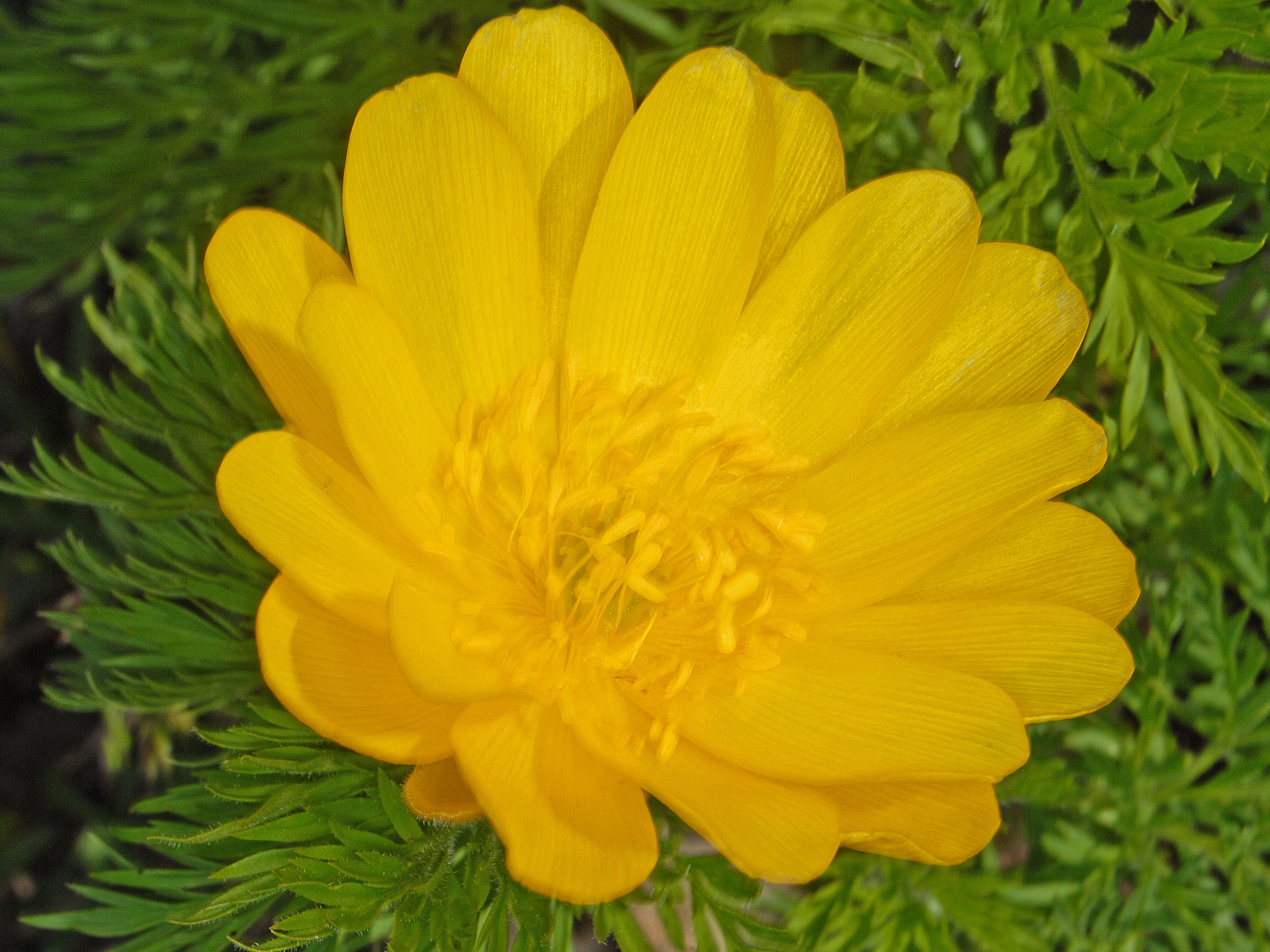
Close-up on a flower

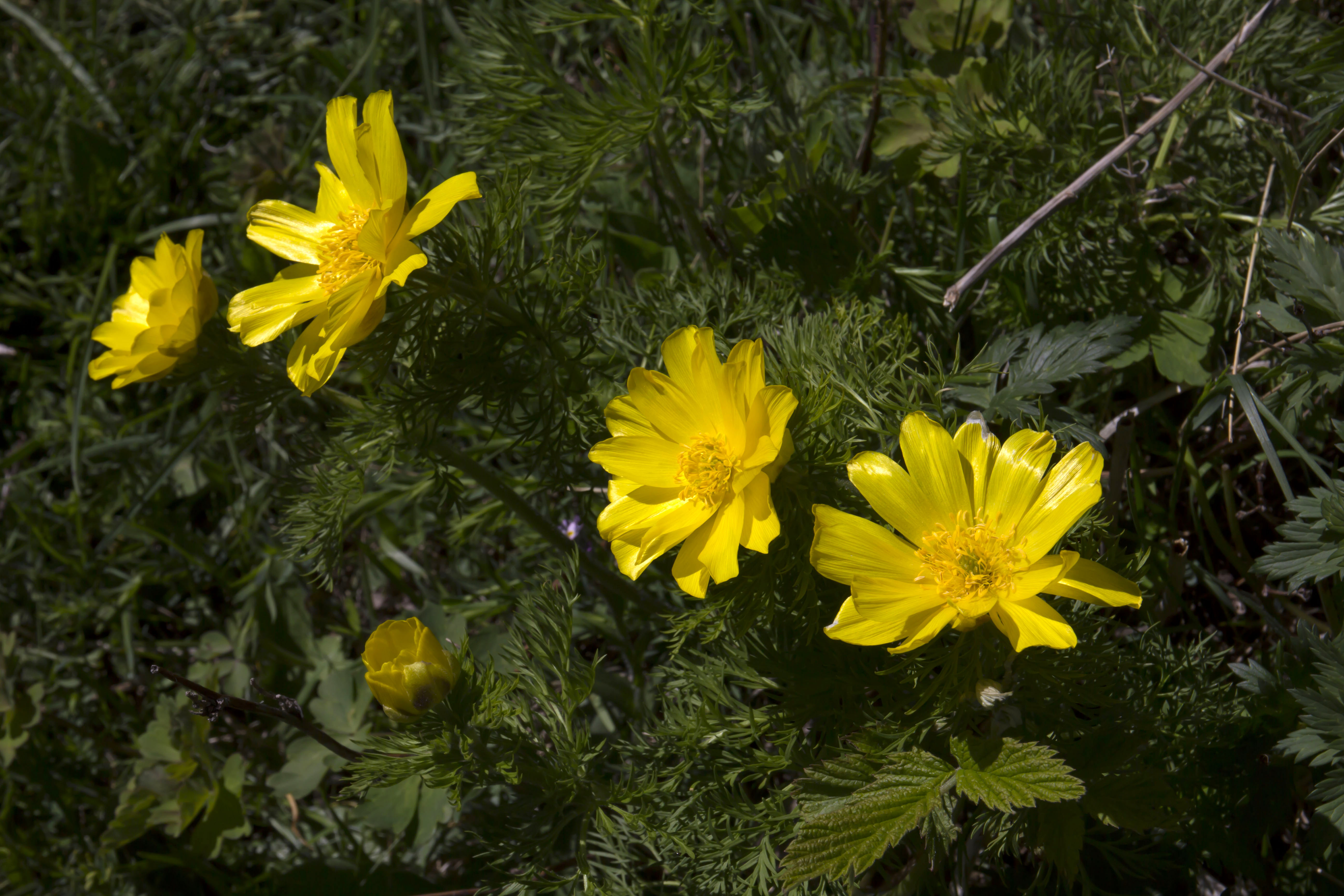
Adonis pyrenaica - Nature reserve Eyne

== Bibliography ==
- Marcel Saule, « Adonis des Pyrénées » dans Le Dictionnaire des Pyrénées, Toulouse, Privat, 1999, 923 p. (ISBN 2708968165)
