= Loukas Tsoukalis =

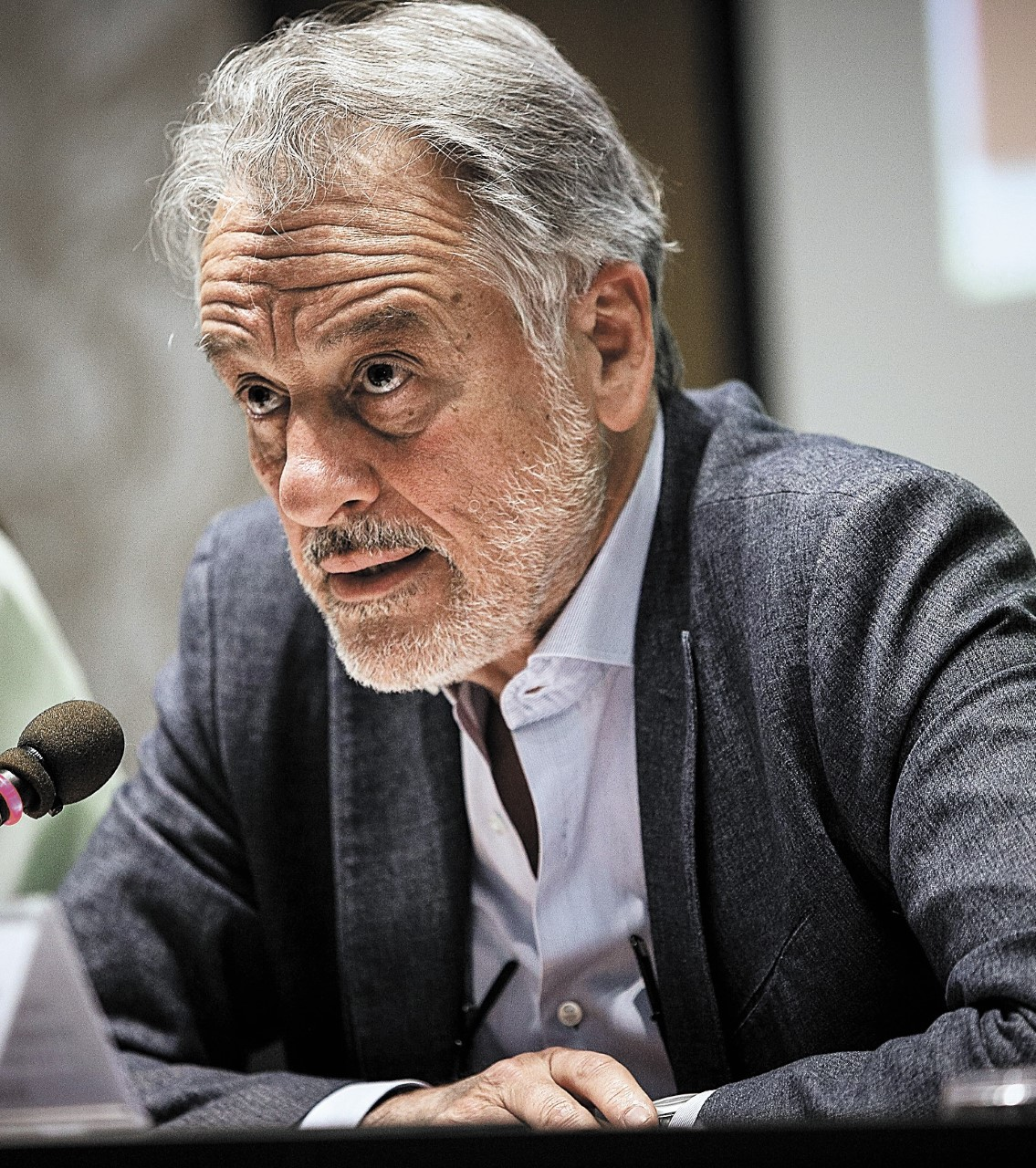
Loukas Tsoukalis

Loukas Tsoukalis is a Greek political economist and European public intellectual with a long experience in EU affairs. He is a Professor (Professeur affilié) at the Paris School of International Affairs, Sciences Po, Emeritus Professor at the University of Athens, and President of the Board of the Hellenic Foundation for European and Foreign Policy (ELIAMEP).

== Career ==
In 1976, he was elected to the first European studies fellowship at St. Catherine's College, Oxford, and in 1984 he became university lecturer in international relations and Fellow of St. Antony's College, Oxford.

He taught at the College of Europe for many years and was the director of the economics department from 1983 to 1999.

He was research fellow at the Royal Institute of International Affairs (Chatham House) in London where he co-directed a project, together with Professor Susan Strange, on the reform of the international monetary system. He was also the editor of the Journal of Common Market Studies, the leading journal in European integration between 1980 and 1984.

In 1990, he returned home as Jean Monnet Professor of European integration at the University of Athens where he taught until 2017 when he became Emeritus Professor.

Between 1998-2001 he was the first holder of the Eleftherios Venizelos Chair at the European Institute of the London School of Economics and Political Science (LSE).

He has also held several Visiting Professorships notably, as visiting professor at SAIS, The Johns Hopkins University in Washington D.C. (1983-4), Pierre Werner professorial fellow at the Schuman Centre of the European University Institute in Florence (2003-4), visiting professor at King's College, London (2013-5), and Pierre Keller visiting professor. at the Kennedy School, Harvard University (2016).

Since 2019, he has been teaching at the Paris School of International Affairs (PSIA), Sciences Po.

His non-academic activities include two short stints as special envoy in Washington D.C. of the Greek minister of National Economy (1983) and special adviser with ambassadorial rank to the Greek prime minister (1988). He was later adviser to the president of the European Commission (2005–11) and the president of the European Council (2012-4).

Since 2001, he has been president of the board of the Hellenic Foundation for European and Foreign Policy (ELIAMEP), Greece's leading think tank.

== Awards and honours ==
In 2021, Oxford University Press published a book (Festschrift) in his honour

He was selected for the 2022 Lifetime Achievement Award by the University Association for Contemporary European Studies (UACES).

He has received decorations by the President of the Hellenic Republic (Commander of the Order of the Phoenix, 2004), the President of the French Republic (Chevalier de la Légion d’honneur, 2016), and the King of Spain (Order of Civil Merit, 2021) and the Emperor of Japan (Order of the Rising Sun, Gold Rays with Neck Ribbon, 2022).

== Selected works ==
- Europe's Coming of Age (Polity, 2022). ISBN 9781509554553.
- In Defence of Europe: Can the European Project be Saved? (Oxford University Press, 2016) ISBN 978-0198755319.
- What Kind of Europe? (Oxford University Press, 2003, 2005) ISBN 9780199279487.
- The New European Economy: The Politics and Economics of European Integration (Oxford University Press, 1991, 1993). ISBN 9780198287506.
- The New European Economy Revisited (Oxford University Press, 1997). ISBN 9780198775621.
- The Political Economy of International Money (Sage for RIIA, 1985). Editor and author of ‘The new international monetary “system” and prospects for reform’. ISBN 0803997116.
- The Politics and Economics of European Monetary Integration (Allen & Unwin, 1977). Reprinted by Routledge, 2017. ISBN 978-1138732025.

His books have been translated into several languages.
