= Constantine Goulimis =

Greek lawyer and botanist

Constantine Goulimis Κωνσταντίνος Γουλιμής
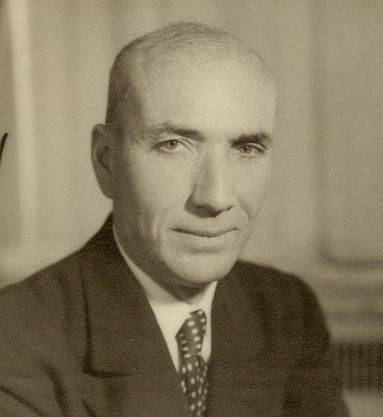
- Goulimis, c. 1945
- Born: July 13, 1886; Athens, Greece
- Died: May 20, 1963 (aged 76); Athens, Greece
- Occupation: lawyer, botanist

Constantine Goulimis (also appears as Constantine N. Goulimy; Kōnstantinos N Goulimēs, Greek: Κωνσταντίνος Γουλιμής) (1886–1963) was a lawyer and successful amateur botanist. He discovered several species of Greek plants.

== Education and career ==
Goulimis was born in Athens, on 13 July 1886, and studied law in Athens, Paris, London, Rome and Berlin where he obtained his PhD. He practised law in Athens and was, for some time, legal advisor to the British Embassy in Athens (receiving the OBE in 1962). In 1945 he was a member of the Greek delegation to San Francisco for the United Nations Conference on International Organization that led to the formation of the United Nations.

During World War II, when in South Africa, Goulimis became interested in botany. Upon his return to Greece in 1945 and until his death on 20 May 1963, he visited many regions of Greece in search of plants. His specimens are kept separate at the Goulandris Museum of Natural History in Kifissia (ATH). He authored Wild Flowers of Greece, and other texts.

He was the grandfather of Constantine Goulimis, founder of Greycon and grandson of another Constantine Goulimis, who fought in the siege of Missolonghi during the Greek War of Independence and later became a lawyer.

In 2019 the Bank of Greece issued a commemorative €5 coin depicting the tulipa goulimyi.

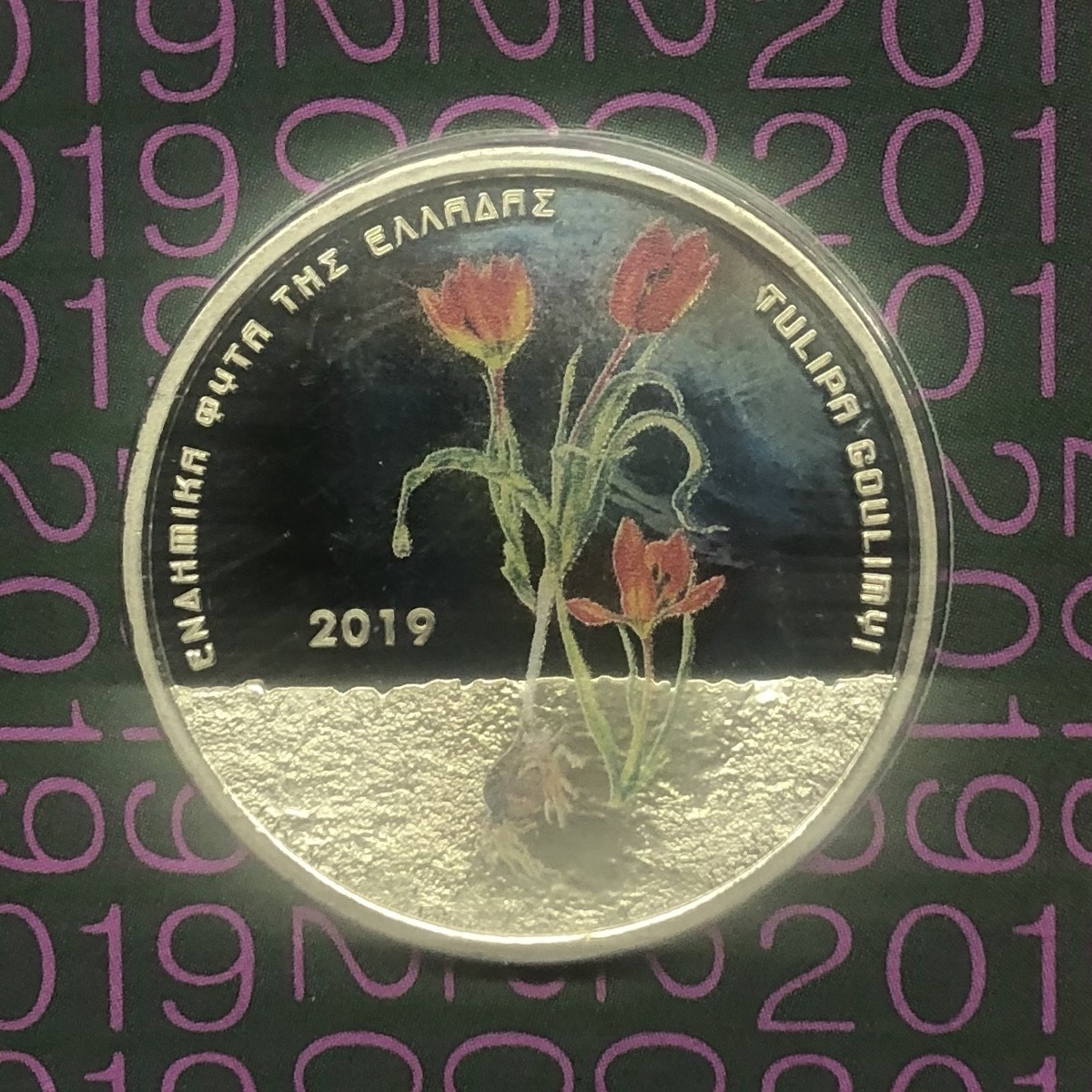

== Selected publications ==
- Goulimis, Constantine; Stearn, William T. (1968). Wild Flowers of Greece. Illustrated by Niki Goulandris. Athens: Goulandris Natural History Museum.

== Eponymy ==
The plant species Campanula goulimyi, Silene goulimyi, Crocus goulimyi, Scutellaria goulimyi, Stachys goulimyi, Tulipa goulimyi and Linum goulimyi are named after him.
