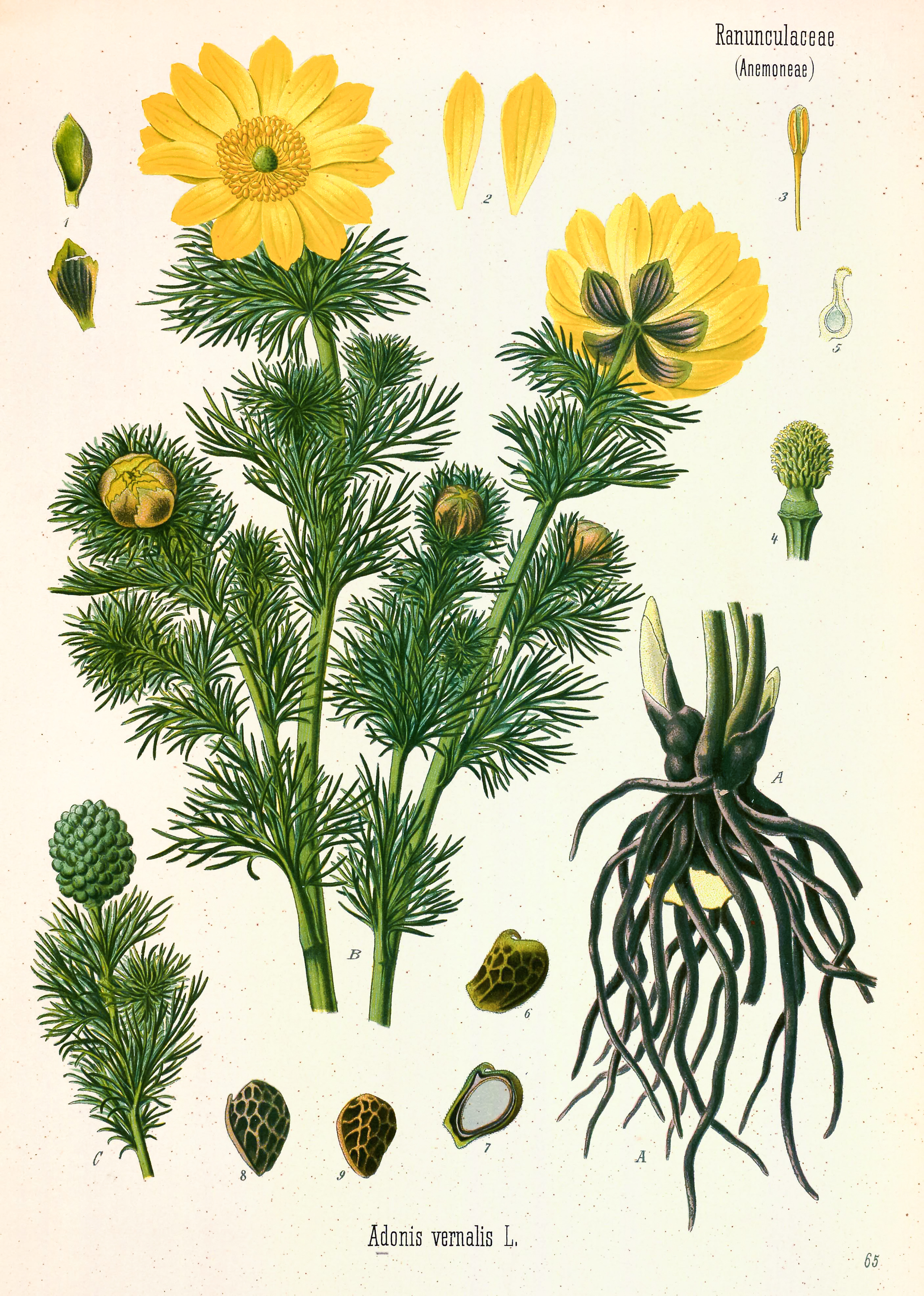
- Adonis vernalis, spring pheasant's eye

Scientific classification
- Kingdom: Plantae
- Clade: Tracheophytes
- Clade: Angiosperms
- Clade: Eudicots
- Order: Ranunculales
- Family: Ranunculaceae
- Subfamily: Ranunculoideae
- Tribe: Adonideae
- Genus: Adonis; L.

Species
- See text

= Adonis (plant) =

Genus of flowering plants in the buttercup family

Adonis is a genus of about 20–30 species of flowering plants in the buttercup family, Ranunculaceae, native to Europe and Asia.

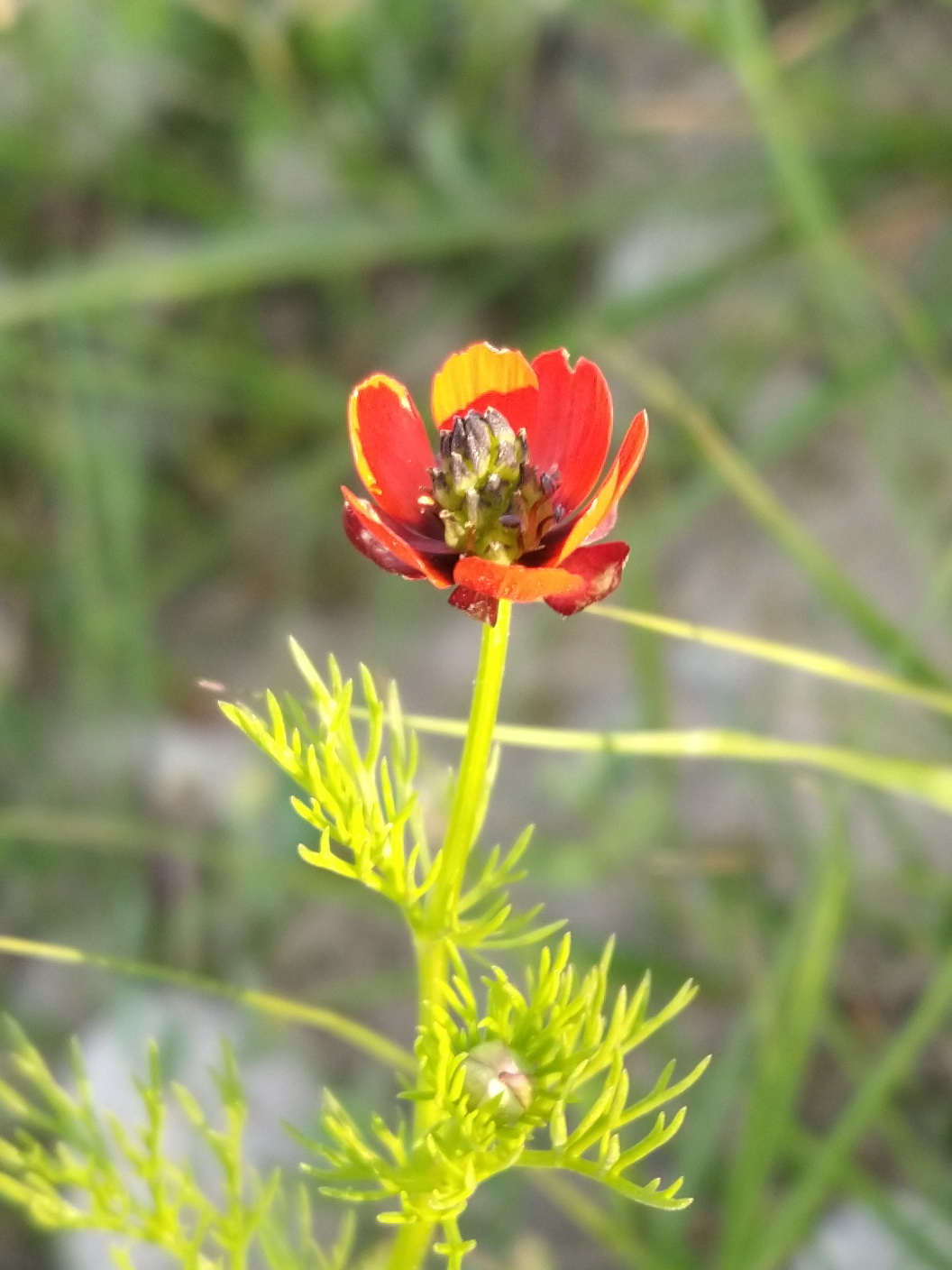
A rare pied Adonis in Behbahan

The species grow to 10–40 centimetres (3.9–15.7 in) in height, with feathery, finely divided leaves. Their flowers are red, yellow or orange and have 5–30 petals. The Autumn Adonis, pheasant's-eye (A. annua), has flowers with bright red petals.

The generic name Adonis refers to the mythical character Adonis, a lover of the goddess Aphrodite or Venus, and of Persephone, goddess of the underworld. Red flowers of the Adonis genus are said to have grown from the grave of Adonis, after he was slain by a wild boar possessed with unusual viciousness through instigation by the jealous Ares. According to the Metamorphoses of Ovid the anemone, also of the family Ranunculaceae, was created when Venus sprinkled nectar on his blood.

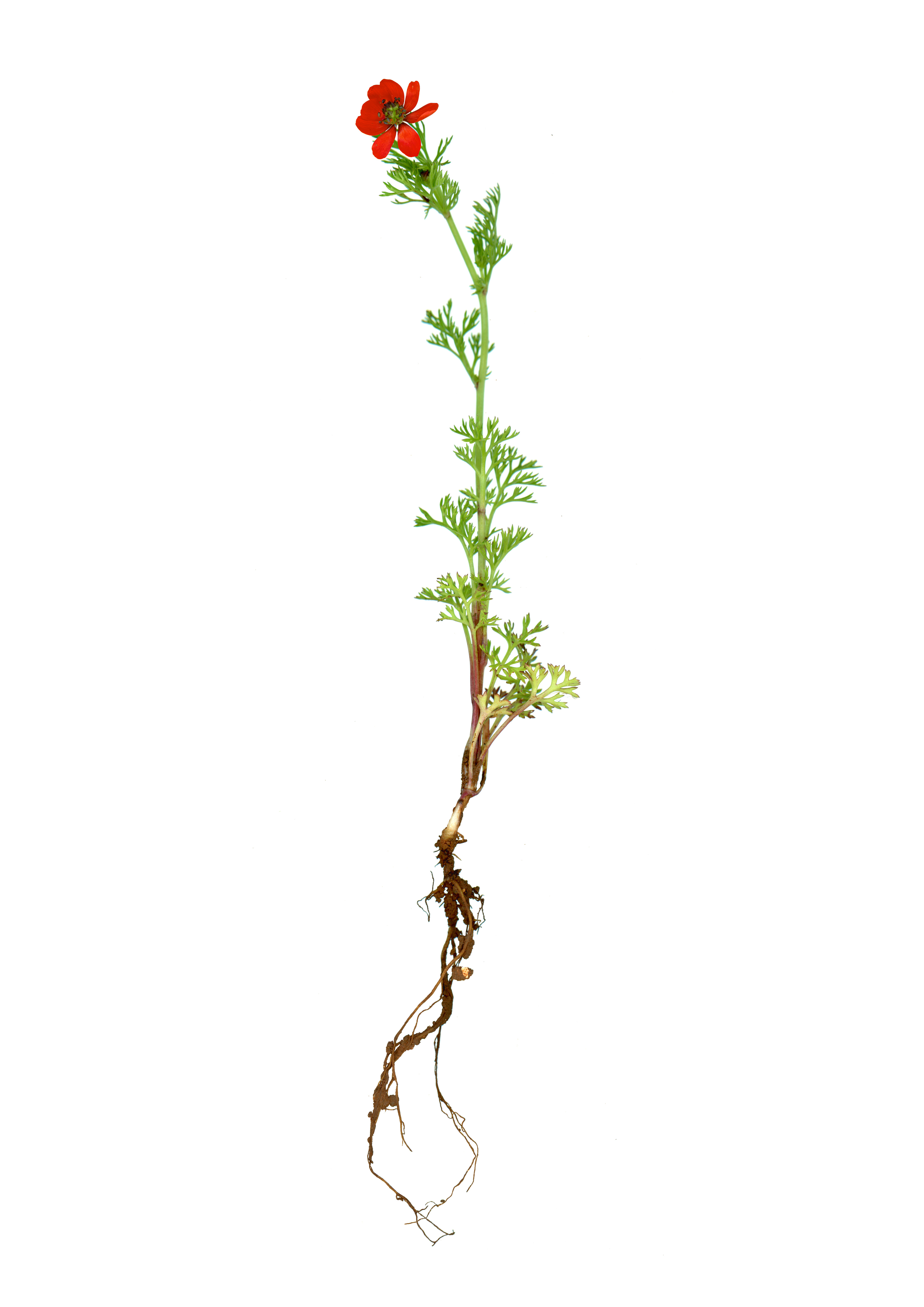

== Selected species ==
- Adonis aestivalis - summer pheasant's-eye
- Adonis aleppica
- Adonis amurensis - Far East Amur adonis
- Adonis annua (syn. A. autumnalis) - pheasant's-eye or blooddrops
- Adonis bobroviana
- Adonis chrysocyathus
- Adonis coerulea
- Adonis cyllenea
- Adonis davidii
- Adonis dentata
- Adonis distorta
- Adonis flammea
- Adonis microcarpa
- Adonis nepalensis
- Adonis palaestina
- Adonis pseudoamurensis
- Adonis pyrenaica from the Pyrenees, has thick foliage and large golden yellow flowers in early summer.
- Adonis ramosa
- Adonis sibirica
- Adonis sutchuenensis
- Adonis tianschanica
- Adonis vernalis - spring pheasant's-eye
- Adonis volgensis

== Systematics ==
Initial characterization by Wang Wen-Tsai

Morphological Cladogram of Adonis

- Adonis
  - subgen. Adonis
    - Sect. Adonis
      - Adonis annua
      - Adonis baetica
    - Sect. Rhynchocarpa
      - Adonis eriocalycina
      - Adonis paliaestina
      - Adonis aleppica
    - Sect. Lophocarpa
      - Ser. Aestivales
        Adonis aestivalis
      - Ser. Dentata
        - Adonis flammea
        - Adonis microcarpa
        - Adonis dentata
  - subgen. Adonanthe
    - Sect. Leiocarapa
      Adonis Nepalensis
    - Sect. Ancistrocarpium
      - Adonis chrysocyathus
      - Adonis cyllenea
      - Adonis distorta
      - Adonis pyrenaica
    - Sect. Adonanthe
      - Ser. Amurenses
        - Adonis davidii
        - Adonis brevistyla
        - Adonis sutchuenensis
        - Adonis ramosa
        - Adonis amurensis
      - Ser. Coeruleae
        - Adonis integra
        - Adonis coerulea
      - Ser. Apenninae
        - Adonis turkestancia
        - Adonis tianschanica
        - Adonis apennina
        - Adonis villosa
        - Adonis bobroviana
        - Adonis mongolica
      - Ser. Vernales
        - Adonis transsilvanica
        - Adonis volgensis
        - Adonis vernalis

Wang Wen-Tsai

=== Subgen. 1. Adonanthe (Spach) ===
Perennial herbs, with robust rhizomes. Some or all of the basal leaves are reduced to vaginiform scales at the lower stem ridges. The last lobe of the leaves is ovate, triangular, lanceolate or linear. Petals (7-8-)9 or more, yellow, white, or blue, not dark-spotted at the base. The anthers are muddy. Carpel not dorso-ventrally compressed, dorsally not longitudinally ribbed, more or less distinct into ovary and style, ovaries usually pubescent rarely glabrous. Aggregate fruit broadly ovoid or globose, with an oblong or lanceolate receptacle. Type: A. vernalia L.

==== Sect. 1 Leiocarpa ====
Basal leaves 3-5 normally developed, 3-pinnate-sectate, long petiolate, base broadly and thinly sheathed, oblong plates, circ. 4 reduced to thinly membranous dark-brown narrowly ovate or oblong scales 7-10mm wide. The stem leaves all developed normally. Achenium glabrous, smooth, arched-convex on the back, lacking a transverse crest, longitudinally 2-ribbed on both sides, persistent style short circ. 0.8mm long straight. Type: A. nepalensis Simon

==== Sect. 2 Ancistrocarpium ====
Basal leaves 1-3 normally developed. 3-4-ternate-pinnate-secta, long petiolate, triangular plates, 3-5 membranous dark-brown oblong or ovate-oblong circ. 1.5 cm wide reduced, rarely reduced to vaginiform scales. The leaves of the stem are all normally developed, the lowest one long petiolate. Achenium glabrous or pubescent, dorsum arched-convex, rarely truncate at very convex apex, provided with a narrow transverse crest or lacking it, inconspicuously or distinctly longitudinally veined on both sides, persistent style more or less elongate 1.2-4mm long with hooked-curved apex. Type: A. chrysosyatha Hook. f. and Thomas

==== Sect. 3 Adonanthe ====
Basal leaves all with lower stems reduced to brown papery scales narrowly oblong or oblong-lanceolate rarely oblong 3-8(-10)mm wide. Median and upper cauline leaves normally developed, 3-4-ternate-pinnate-sectate or 2-3-pinnate-sectate, longitudinally shortly petiolate or sessile, ovate or triangular plates, rarely elliptic. Achenium pubescent, very convex at the back tip, rounded-truncate, lacking a transverse crest, wrinkled or reticulate on both sides, short persistent style 0.4–1 mm long, often strongly recurved achene appressed, rarely straight substraight or slightly recurved. Type: A. vernalis L.

Series 1. Amurenses

Lower stem leaves petiolate, 3-4-ternate-pinnate-sectioned, ovate or triangular, rarely elliptic leaves. Petals yellow or white, (7-8-) 10-22. Persistent style often strongly recurved and appressed to the achene, rarely erect or slightly recurved. Type: A. amurensis Regel et Radde.

Series 2. Coeruleae

Lower stem leaves petiolate, 3-4-pinnate-sectate, oblong or ovate-oblong plates. Petals white or blue, 8-9. Style persistently erect or more or less recurved, not appressed to the achene, or very short. Type: A. coerulea Maxim.

The species between A. brevistylam Franch. and A. coerulea Maxim, intermediate, differs from that with ovate-oblong or oblong 3-pinnate-sectioned leaf plates, fewer petals, and a much higher stem, white petals intact.

A perennial herb. Stem 16–40 cm high, often branched far above the base, glabrous, the base provided with 3-4 papyracea brownish or brownish-white narrowly ovate or lanceolate-wide scales 0.6-1.5 cm long. Stem leaves petiolate, glabrous; blades ovate-oblong or oblong, 2.5–12 cm long, 1.2-3.5 cm wide, 3-pinnate-segmented, pinnae 3-4-ridged sessile or subsessile, the last lobes ovate-triangular or narrowly lanceolate, pointed at the tip; petiole 1-6.8 cm long, flower 1.2-2.4 cm diam.; sepals 5. subrhomboid or lanceolate, 5-8.5 mm long, glabrous; petals white, 8-9, broadly oblanceolate or oblong-oblanceolate, 7-11mm long, 2.6-5mm wide, apex obtuse or rounded; stamens numerous, 3-5mm long, oblong anthers 1-1.5mm long. Fruit aggregate globose, 7-9mm diam.; achene obliquely obovoid, the tip strongly convex on the back, circ. 4.5 mm long, 3 mm wide, reticulate-wrinkled, densely pubescent, persistent styles ca. 0.6mm long slightly recurved.

Series 3. Apenninae

Stem leaves sessile or subsessile, 2-3-pinnate-sect, ovate plates. Petals yellow, rarely white, 9-15. Persistent style often strongly recurved and appressed to the achene, rarely slightly recurved. Type: A. turkestanica (Korsh. )Adolf

Series 4. Vernales

Stem leaves sessile, 3-palmate-pinnate-sect, ovate plates. Petals yellow, 12-18. Persistent style greatly recurved and appressed to the achene. Type: A. vernalis L

=== Subgen. 2. Adonis ===
An annual herb with paler roots. The leaves are all normally developed, 3-4-pinnate-sect, rarely 3-ternate-sect, the last lobes linear or narrowly linear. Petals 8 or fewer, red or yellow, base usually dark-spotted. Anthers dark-purple or dark-blue. Carpel dorso-ventrally compressed below anthesis, flattened, lanceolate, gradually tapering from the ovary upwards into the generally broad style, longitudinally 1-ribbed on the back, glabrous. Aggregate fruits are generally conical or conical-cylindrical, subtended by a receptacle. Type: A. annual L.

==== Sect. 1. Adonis ====
Achene lacking a ventral projection, lacking or having a transverse crest, short persistent style. Type: A. annual L.

==== Sect. 2. Rhynchocarpa ====
Achene lacking a ventral projection, provided with a transverse ridge, persistent style more or less elongated 0.8–3 mm long tip often recurved. Type: A. aleppica Boiss.

==== Sect. 3. Lophocarpa ====
Achene provided with a ventral projection and a transverse crest, a short persistent style 0.2-l(-2)mm long straight rarely recurved. Type: A. summer L.

Series 1. Aestivales

Achenium ventral projection arranged above the middle of the ventral suture provided by a persistently removed style. Type: A. summer L.

Series 2. Dentate

Achene projecting ventrally to the apex of the ventral suture provided with a persistent style contiguous. Type: A. dentata Del.

Molecular Phylogeny of Adonis

- - Outgroup
    - Trollius ascaulis
    - Trollius chinensis
    - Trollius asiaticus
  - - subgen. Adonis
      - Adonis annua
      - - - - Adonis globosa
            - Adonis dentata
        - - - Adonis scrobiculata
            - Adonis microcarpa
          - - Adonis flammea
            - Adonis aestivalis
    - subgen. Adonanthe
      - - Adonis sutchuenensis
        - - - Adonis coerulea
            - Adonis coerulea var. puberula
          - - Adonis brevistyla
            - Adonis davidii
      - - Adonis vernalis
        - - - - Adonis bobroviana
              - Adonis sibirica
          - - - Adonis shikokuensis
              - Adonis multiflora
              - Adonis pseudoamurensis
            - - Adonis ramosa
              - Adonis amurensis

Dong Chan Son and Seyed Mehdi Taleb

== Cultivation and uses ==
They are cultivated for use in gardens, and have been introduced to North America. Adonis spp. contain poisonous chemicals similar to those found in many other genera in the Ranunculaceae.

== See also ==
- Herbalism
