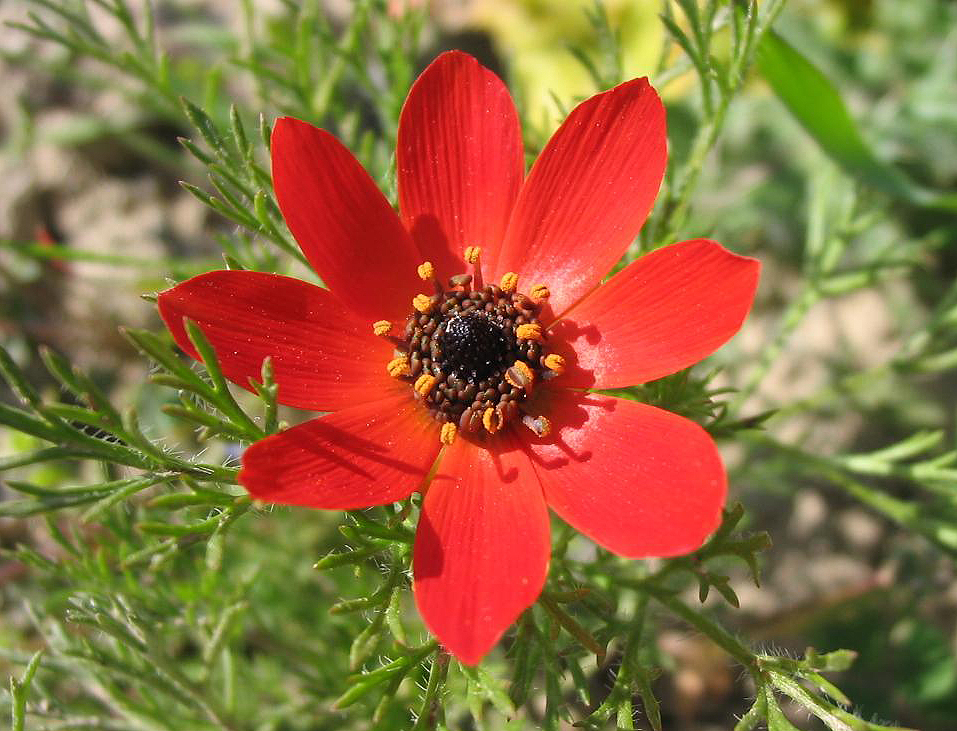

Scientific classification
- Kingdom: Plantae
- Clade: Tracheophytes
- Clade: Angiosperms
- Clade: Eudicots
- Order: Ranunculales
- Family: Ranunculaceae
- Genus: Adonis
- Species: A. annua

Binomial name
- Adonis annua L.

= Adonis annua =

Blooddrops

Species of flowering plant in the buttercup family

Adonis annua (syn. Adonis autumnalis L., Adonis phoenicea Bercht. & J.Presl.), also known (Note: Other common names include Adonis Flos and Flos Adonis.) as pheasant's-eye, Adonis' flower, autumn Adonis, autumn pheasant's-eye, blooddrops, red chamomile, red Morocco, rose-a-ruby, and soldiers-in-green, is an ornamental plant of the family Ranunculaceae. It is named after the Greek mythology character Adonis.

It is native to North Africa, Western Asia, the Mediterranean, and Europe. The name Bird's Eye is also associated with the bird's-eye primrose. Pheasant's eye is also an alternative name for poet's narcissus.

Adonis annua grows to a height of 10 in (25 cm). The flowers are often scarlet in color with darker spots at the base.

In the UK, Adonis annua is endangered and listed as a priority species under the UK Biodiversity Action Plan.

The leaves and roots are poisonous to humans and livestock.

== Symbolism ==
According to the Language of flowers by Kate Greenaway the Adonis represents "painfull recollections". The flower also tends to represent grief but always conveys the message of sad memories.
