= Goulandris Natural History Museum =

Natural history museum in Kifisia, Athens, Greece

Coordinates: 38°04′28″N 23°48′54″E

Goulandris Museum of Natural History Μουσείο Γουλανδρή Φυσικής Ιστορίας
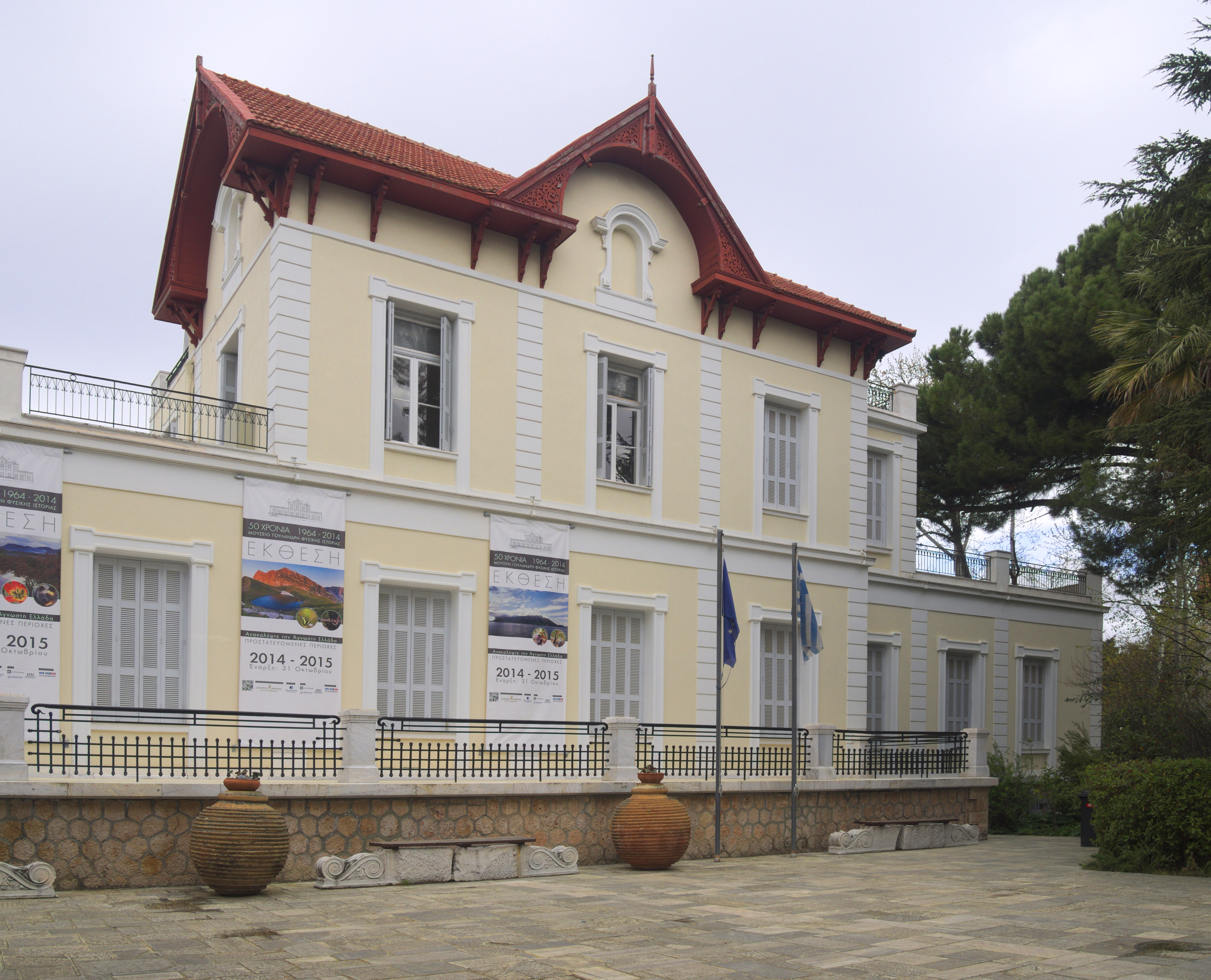
- Established: 1965
- Location: Kifisia, Athens, Greece
- Type: Natural History
- Website: http://www.gnhm.gr (Greek), http://www.gnhm.gr/MuseumSelect.aspx?lang=en-US (English)

The Goulandris Museum of Natural History is a museum in Kifisia, a northeastern suburb of Athens, Greece. It was founded by Angelos Goulandris and Niki Goulandris in 1965 in order to promote interest in the natural sciences, to raise the awareness of the public, in general, and in particular to call its attention to the need to protect Greece's natural wildlife habitats and species in the danger of extinction.

The museum includes large collections of insects, mammals, birds, reptiles, shells, rocks, minerals and fossils, from the rich natural wildlife of the Greek territory. The botanical collections number over 200.000 species of plants, among which there are 145 newly discovered ones, which have been recorded thanks to the museum's research. The kernel of the botanical collection was formed when it acquired the collection of Constantine Goulimis, the author of Wild Flowers of Greece that was illustrated by Niki Goulandris. In the museum's laboratories, scientific research is being carried out in the areas of ecology, botany, zoology, geology, palaeontology and biotechnology. In the exhibition rooms are presented in detail the variety and interdependence of the biocommunities and the floral, animal and geological wealth of Greece.

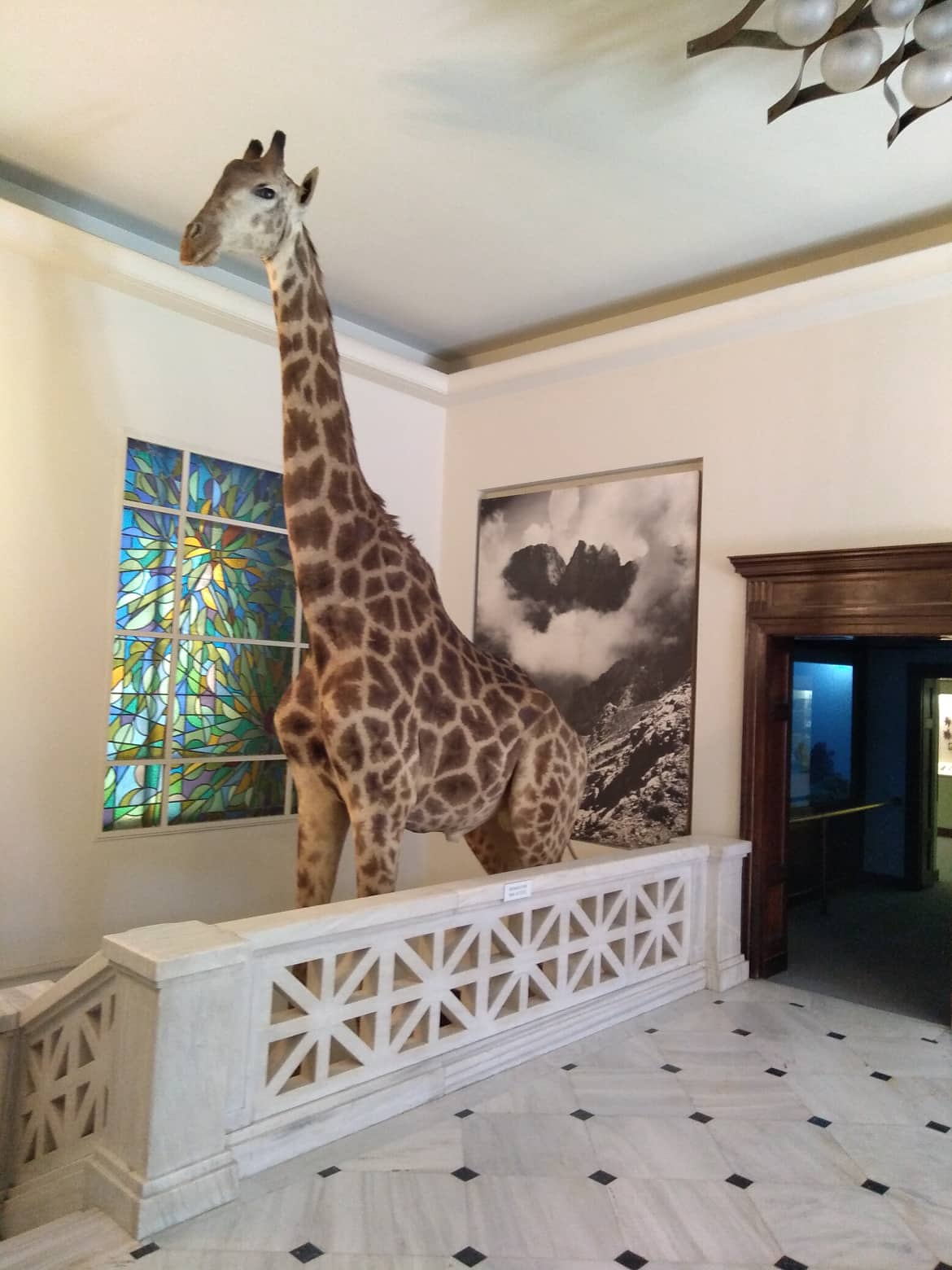
A display of a giraffe inside Goulandris Museum of Natural History.

The Goulandris Museum of Natural History also functions as a complementary educational institution for all levels of education. Its activities include further education programmes, seminars, lectures, the publication of books and other material, and itinerant exhibitions on crucial environmental issues in Greece and abroad. Its publications include a scientific journal, the Annales Musei Goulandris (1973–). The Museum is linked to international organizations and to Institutes of Higher Education.

Some of the most important exhibits of the museum are the Zoology Room, the Palaeontology Room and the display of bivalve molluscs from various parts of the world.

In 2010, rhizomes of Iris hellenica (found in the mountains of the Peloponnese) were given the garden of the Goulandris Natural History Museum, who had funded Dionysios Mermygkas, to study the plants of the mountains. The iris grew well vegetatively for a year, but failed to flower. Unfortunately they did not survive the following year, but they survived in Copenhagen (who also received rhizomes).

== See also ==
- List of museums in Greece
