= Adonis cyllenea =

Scientific classification
- Kingdom: Plantae
- Clade: Tracheophytes
- Clade: Angiosperms
- Clade: Eudicots
- Order: Ranunculales
- Family: Ranunculaceae
- Genus: Adonis
- Species: A. cyllenea

Binomial name
- Adonis cyllenea Boiss., Heldr. & Orph.

Synonyms
- Adonanthe cyllenea (Boiss., Heldr. & Orph.) Sennikov; Chrysocyathus cylleneus (Boiss., Heldr. & Orph.) Chrtek & Slavíková

Species of plant in the buttercup family

Adonis cyllenea is a species of flowering plant in the family Ranunculaceae. It is endemic to Greece.

== Geographical distribution ==
Adonis cyllenea is one of hundreds of rare plants that have been removed from Greek mountain sides. Adjacent to Mt. Oligirtos existed an unbotanized mountain, Mt. Saitas. Mt. Saitas lies practically at the same latitude as Mt. Lafkas. At this location G. Sfikas, a keen naturalist and photographer from Athens had rediscovered the Adonis cyllenea, which was presumed to be extinct, in 1976. Very little was known about the botanical importance of Mt. Saitas. However, this location proved to be an amazing place, because more than 100,000 individual plants of Adonis cyllenea were rediscovered at an altitude of approximately 1400-1800m. This area certainly holds the largest existing population of the Adonis cyllenea in Greece. This yellow and sometimes orange anemone from the Peloponnese was thought to be extinct for 130 years prior to this major rediscovery, which was an exhilarating moment for modern scientists, botanists and naturalists. Adonis cyllenea is also cultivated in the botanical gardens of Copenhagen or Gothenburg where it can be found in their designated Greek flora section among dozens of other native Greek plants.

== Physical characteristics ==
Adonis cyllenea grows throughout the entire spring season. Exposure to sun and warm conditions are ideal for the growth of Adonis cyllenea. Heights of these plants may range anywhere from 8 inches (20 cm) to 15 inches (38 cm). Orange or yellow flowers are often characteristics of Adonis cyllenea. Flower color is variable within the species and changes with drying, and diagnostic features of the fruit are reliable only when achenes are fully mature.

== Sources ==
- Parfitt, Bruce D. Adonis. Flora of North America. Vol. 3. Oxford University Press.
- Tan, K., Perdetzoglou, D.K., Roussis, V. (1997). "Biebersteinia orphanidis (Geraniaceae) from southern Greece." Ann.Bot. Fennici 34: 41-45. ISSN 0003-3847.
