= Hellenic Foundation for European and Foreign Policy =

- Ελληνικό Ίδρυμα Ευρωπαϊκής & Εξωτερικής Πολιτικής
- Abbreviation: ELIAMEP
- Type: Nonprofit
- Website: http://www.eliamep.gr/

The Hellenic Foundation for European and Foreign Policy (Greek acronym: ELIAMEP) is an independent, non-profit Greek institute that conducts policy-oriented research and training. It has the following goals and objectives:

- To research topics pertaining to European foreign and security policies in the wider South- and Southeast European, Black Sea and Mediterranean regions, as well as issues related to international politics, transatlantic relations, security and economics in order to contribute to and influence public debate
- To provide decision-makers, both in the public and private sectors in Greece and abroad, with authoritative and independent information, analysis and proposals for action
- To train professionals (civil servants, politicians, journalists and academics, among others) in a variety of areas such as conflict prevention, management and resolution skills, European integration, the monitoring of democratic elections and civil society building, the role of the media in civil societies, and the creation of international networks of leaders committed to working together to enhance cooperation and good governance in Europe and the Mediterranean region
- To raise the level of the domestic research community and to raise public awareness about foreign policy and international affairs

The organization is based in Athens.

== Presidents ==
- Giannis Valinakis
- Loukas Tsoukalis
