= William Fleming Bewley =

British mycologist (1891-1976)

William Fleming Bewley CBE (1891 – 11 December 1976, Newcastle upon Tyne) was a British mycologist, plant pathologist, and horticulturalist.

Upon graduating from Armstrong College, Durham University, Bewley was appointed in 1914 as assistant bacteriologist to H. B. Hutchinson at Rothamsted Experimental Station. After serving in the Royal Field Artillery during WW I, Bewley returned to Rothamsted in 1919. A few months after his return, he was appointed mycologist at the Experimental and Research Station, Cheshunt, famous for the fungicide "Cheshunt Compound". He was the station's director from 1921 until its closure in 1955. As the station's director, he was outstanding in promoting co-operation between glasshouse growers and scientific workers.

When the Glasshouse Crops Research Institute (GCRI) was established in 1954, Bewley became the institute's first director and was responsible for the initial development of the CGRI's Littlehampton site. The GCRI was the successor to the Experimental and Research Station, Chestnut (in operation from 1914 to 1955) and also took over the work of the Mushroom Growers’ Association Research Station (which was in operation from 1946 to 1954 at Yaxley). Bewley directed the assimilation of 14 scientific staff who were re-located from the two predecessor organisations and the addition of 42 support staff who were recruited from the Littlehampton area. He retired in 1956. His successor as director was F. W. Toovey. In retirement, Bewley chaired the Worthing Rural District Council.

Bewley's 1923 book Diseases of Glasshouse Plants was for many years a standard reference. His short book Cultivation of Mushrooms, co-authored with J. Harnett, was an excellent guide for cultivating edible mushrooms and went through three editions. Bewley's comprehensive handbook Commercial Glasshouse Crops gives details of the husbandry of glasshouse crops in the 1st half of the 20th century. His 1959 book Science Has Green Fingers was an outgrowth of his BBC gardening programmes with Roy Hay.

Bewley made important contributions to control of plant diseases, biological control of glasshouse pests, virus-free seed, and CO_{2} enrichment in glasshouses. For his services to the glasshouse crop industry in the United Kingdom and the Channel Islands, he was made in 1935 Commander of the Order of the British Empire (CBE) and in 1938 was awarded the Victoria Medal of Honour (VMH) of the Royal Horticultural Society. In 1978 the GCRI officially opened the Bewley Conference Hall and established the Bewley Lectures.

== Selected publications ==
=== Articles ===
- Paine, Sydney G.; Bewley, W. F. (September 1919). "Studies in bacteriosis. iv.—"stripe" disease of tomato". Annals of Applied Biology. VI (1): 183–202. doi:10.1111/j.1744-7348.1919.tb06466.x.
- Bewley, W. F.; Hutchinson, H. B. (1920). "On the changes through which the nodule organism ( Ps. Radicicola ) passes under cultural conditions" (PDF). The Journal of Agricultural Science. 10 (2): 144–162. doi:10.1017/S0021859600006420.
- Bewley, W. F.; Buddin, W. (June 1921). "On the fungus flora of glasshouse water supplies in relation to plant disease". Annals of Applied Biology. VIII (1): 10–19. doi:10.1111/j.1744-7348.1921.tb05530.x.
- Bewley, W. F. (1922). ""Sleepy Disease" of the Tomato1". Annals of Applied Biology. 9 (2): 116–134. doi:10.1111/j.1744-7348.1922.tb05942.x.
- Bewley, W. F. (1923). "Minute "Organisms" isolated from the Virus of Mosaic Disease of Tomato". Nature. 112 (2825): 903. Bibcode:1923Natur.112..903B. doi:10.1038/112903a0.
- Bewley, W. F. (1929). "The Influence of Bright Sunshine Upon the Tomato Under Glass". Annals of Applied Biology. 16 (2): 281–287. doi:10.1111/j.1744-7348.1929.tb07135.x.
- Bolas, Bernard D.; Bewley, W. F. (1930). "Aucuba or Yellow Mosaic of the Tomato: A Note on Metabolism". Nature. 126 (3178): 471. Bibcode:1930Natur.126..471B. doi:10.1038/126471a0.
- Bewley, W. F.; Bolas, Bernard J. (1930). "Aucuba or Yellow Mosaic of the Tomato Plant: Reaction of Infected Juice". Nature. 125 (3143): 130. Bibcode:1930Natur.125R.130B. doi:10.1038/125130b0.
- Bewley, W. F. (1931). "The Nature of the Virus Principle in Mosaic Disease". Nature. 127 (3203): 442. Bibcode:1931Natur.127..442B. doi:10.1038/127442a0.
- Bewley, W. F. (1932). "Some Recent Developments in Relation to Glasshouse Crops". The H.E.A. Year Book. 1: 23–26. JSTOR 45123856.
- Bewley, W. F. (1936). "Twenty-One Years Glasshouse Research at Cheshunt". Scientific Horticulture. 4: 114–125. JSTOR 45126306.
- Oylee, Enid; Bewley, W. F. (1937). "A Disease of Cultivated Heaths Caused by Phytophthora Ginnamomi Rands". Annals of Applied Biology. 24: 1–16. doi:10.1111/j.1744-7348.1937.tb05016.x.
- Bewley, W. F. (1938). "Recent Work on Rose Diseases". Scientific Horticulture. 6: 97–101. JSTOR 45118988.

=== Books and pamphlets ===
- Bewley, William Fleming (1923). Diseases of Glasshouse Plants. London: Ernest Been Ltd; with a foreword by Sir E. John Russell
- Secrett, Frederick Augustus; Bewley, W. F. (1932). Cultivation of lettuce for market. Westminster (London): Royal Horticultural Society.
  - New and revised edition. 1938. LCCN 45028081; 19 pages, illustrated
- Bewley, William Fleming; Harnett, J. (1934). The Cultivation of Mushrooms. London: Shepherd & Hosking Ltd; 80 pages
  - 2nd edition, revised & enlarged. London: Anglo-Scottish Press, Ltd. 1938. LCCN 39006803; 95 pages; illustrated; "Cooking recipes": p. 89-95
  - 2014 edition. Read Books Ltd. 10 April 2014. ISBN 978-1-4733-9317-2.
- Bewley, William Fleming (1950). Commercial glasshouse crops. London: Country Life. LCCN 50014620. OCLC 3202134; 509 pages, illustrated
- Bewley, William Fleming (1959). Science Has Green Fingers: An Authoritative Guide to the Science of Good Gardening. London: C. Arthur Pearson Ltd.
