= Enfield County School =

Enfield County School for Girls
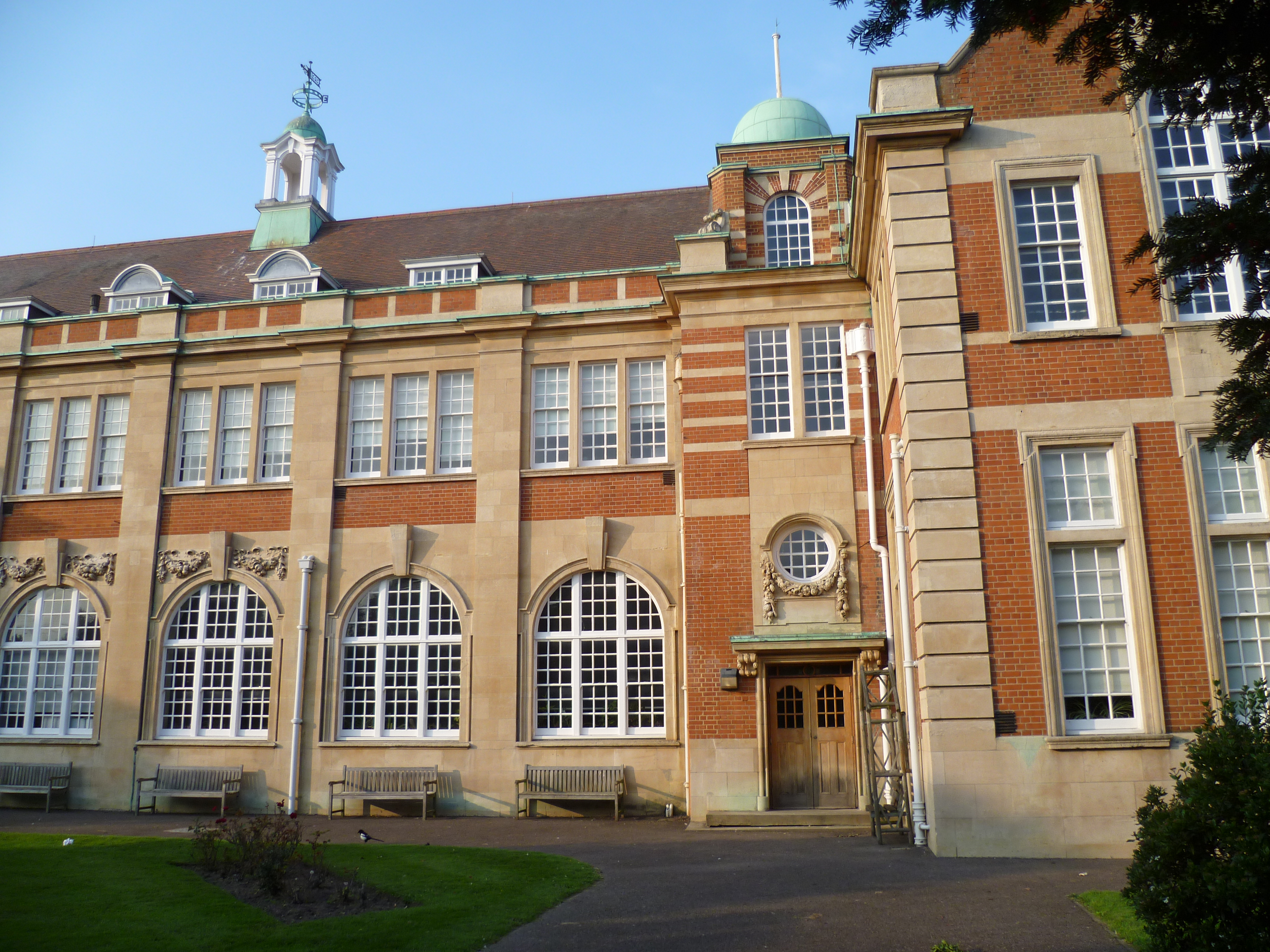

Location
- Holly Walk; Enfield, London, EN2 6QG; England; 51°39′15″N 0°05′01″W

Information
- Type: Community school
- Motto: Learning Today - Leading Tomorrow
- Established: 1909
- Local authority: Enfield
- Department for Education URN: 102048 Tables
- Ofsted: Reports
- Chair of Governors: Keith Carrano
- Head teacher: Jennie Gumbrell
- Gender: Girls
- Age: 11 to 18
- Enrolment: 1099
- Colour: Bottle Green
- Former name: Enfield Chace School
- Website: http://www.enfieldcs.enfield.sch.uk/

Enfield County School for Girls is a girls' comprehensive school that was created as Enfield Chace School in 1967, following the amalgamation of Enfield County School, which had been a girls' grammar school, with Chace Girls School, a secondary modern school. The amalgamated school readopted the name Enfield County School in 1987.

In 2018 the School adopted the name Enfield County School for Girls.

== Admissions ==
It is situated directly in the middle of Enfield, slightly to the north of the town centre, equidistant between the two railway stations, near St Andrew's Enfield.

== History ==
=== Former schools ===
The original Enfield County School had been opened in 1909, becoming Enfield County Grammar School for Girls, which had around 850 girls. It was administered by Middlesex County Council Education Committee (Borough of Enfield). Chace Girls School had been formed in 1962 as a girls' secondary modern school from the senior girls department at Lavender School. Both were well-established girls' schools, each with a long tradition of high achievement and academic excellence, according to the current Headteacher, Ms. J. Gumbrell.

=== Comprehensive ===
It became the comprehensive girls' Enfield Chace School in 1967, changing to its current name in 1987. In 2005 the school was designated a specialist school for languages.

=== Former teachers ===
- Jill Paton Walsh (nee Bliss) CBE, author (taught English from 1959 to 1962 at the grammar school).

== Campus ==
The buildings are a blend of solid Edwardian, post war and 1990s "design-build". The lower school in Rosemary Avenue, which was the former Chace Girls School, houses years 7, 8 and 9; at fourteen years of age students transfer to the upper school in Holly Walk (former grammar school), about a mile away in the centre of the old town of Enfield, London. After Enfield Court in Baker Street was purchased to accommodate the lower school of Enfield Grammar School in 1942, the first year pupils of the previous girls' grammar school, Enfield County School, shared it with the first year pupils of Enfield Grammar for a few years.

== Notable former pupils ==
=== Enfield County School ===
- Keisha White, singer
- Jaime Winstone, actress
- Lois Winstone, actress
- Ash Sarkar, journalist and activist
- Lola Olufemi, writer
- Jasmine Blackborow, actress and voiceover artist

=== Enfield County Grammar School for Girls ===
- Joyce Anelay, Baroness Anelay of St Johns (née Clarke), Conservative politician, former shadow Chief Whip
- Olive Banks (née Davies), historian of feminism
- Geraldine McCaughrean, author
- Dame Helen Metcalf (née Pitt), former headteacher from 1998 to 2001 of Chiswick Community School, and former Islington Labour councillor
- Frances Perry (née Everett) MBE, horticulture author and broadcaster, and wife of Roy Hay (horticulturist)
- Nancy Tait, health campaigner
- Brenda Bruce actress

== See also ==
- Chace Community School, coeducational (former boys' - Chace School) school in Enfield on Churchbury Lane
- Enfield Grammar School, a school that merged with Chace Boys' School.
