= Peter Kay (disambiguation) =

Peter Kay (born 1973) is an English comedian and actor.

Peter Kay may also refer to:

- Peter Kay (rugby union) (born 1966), Australian rugby international
- Peter Edmund Kay (1853–1909), British horticulturalist

== See also ==
- Peter Kaye (born 1979), English footballer
