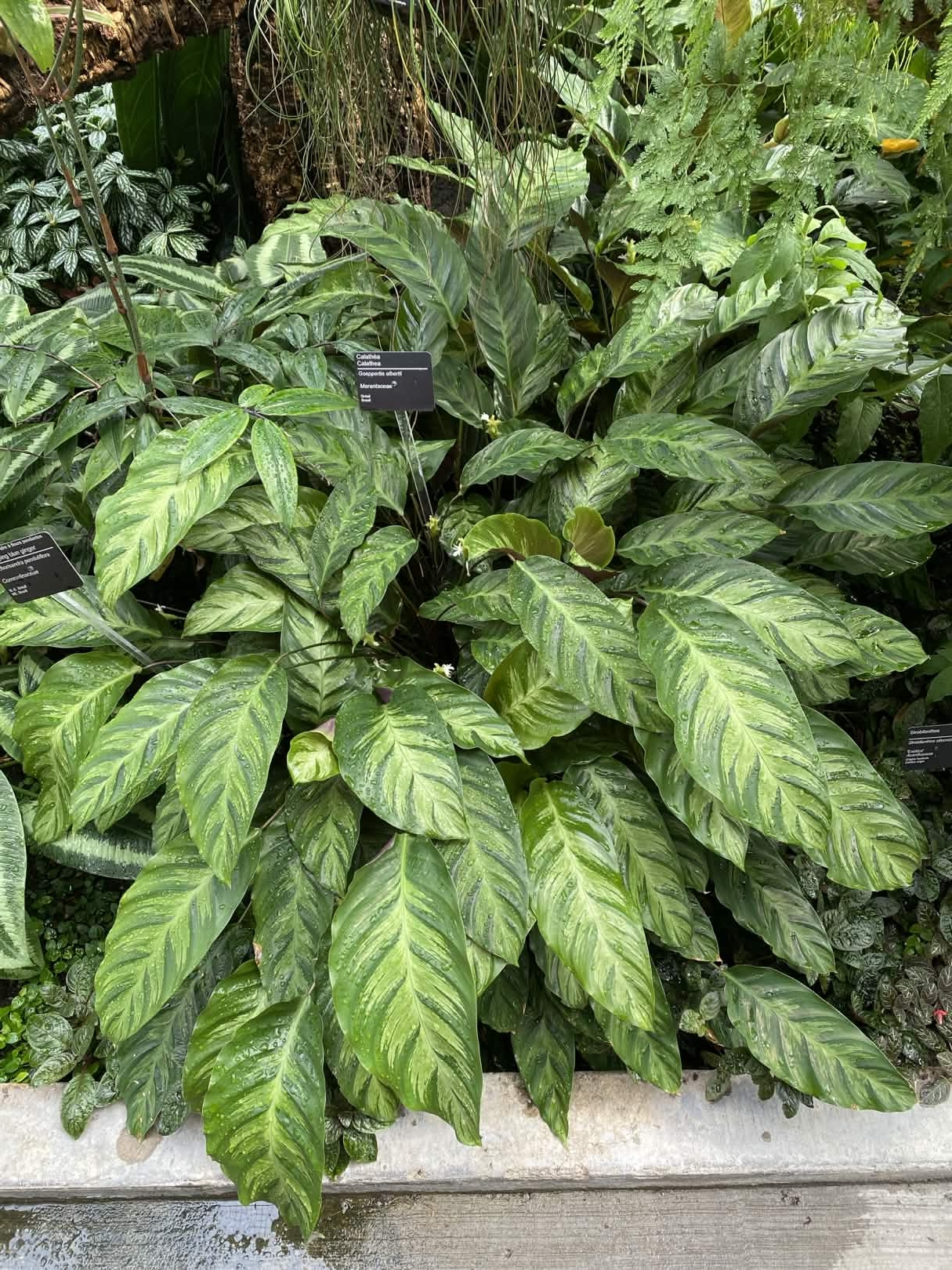

Scientific classification
- Kingdom: Plantae
- Clade: Embryophytes
- Clade: Tracheophytes
- Clade: Spermatophytes
- Clade: Angiosperms
- Clade: Monocots
- Clade: Commelinids
- Order: Zingiberales
- Family: Marantaceae
- Genus: Goeppertia
- Species: G. albertii

Binomial name
- Goeppertia albertii (L.H.Bailey & Raffill) Borchs. & S.Suárez

Synonyms
- Calathea albertii L.H.Bailey & Raffill

= Goeppertia albertii =

Species of flowering plant

Goeppertia albertii (syn. Calathea albertii) is a species of plant belonging to the genus Goeppertia of the Marantaceae family, native to southeastern Brazil. It has been reported as introduced to El Salvador.

== Description ==
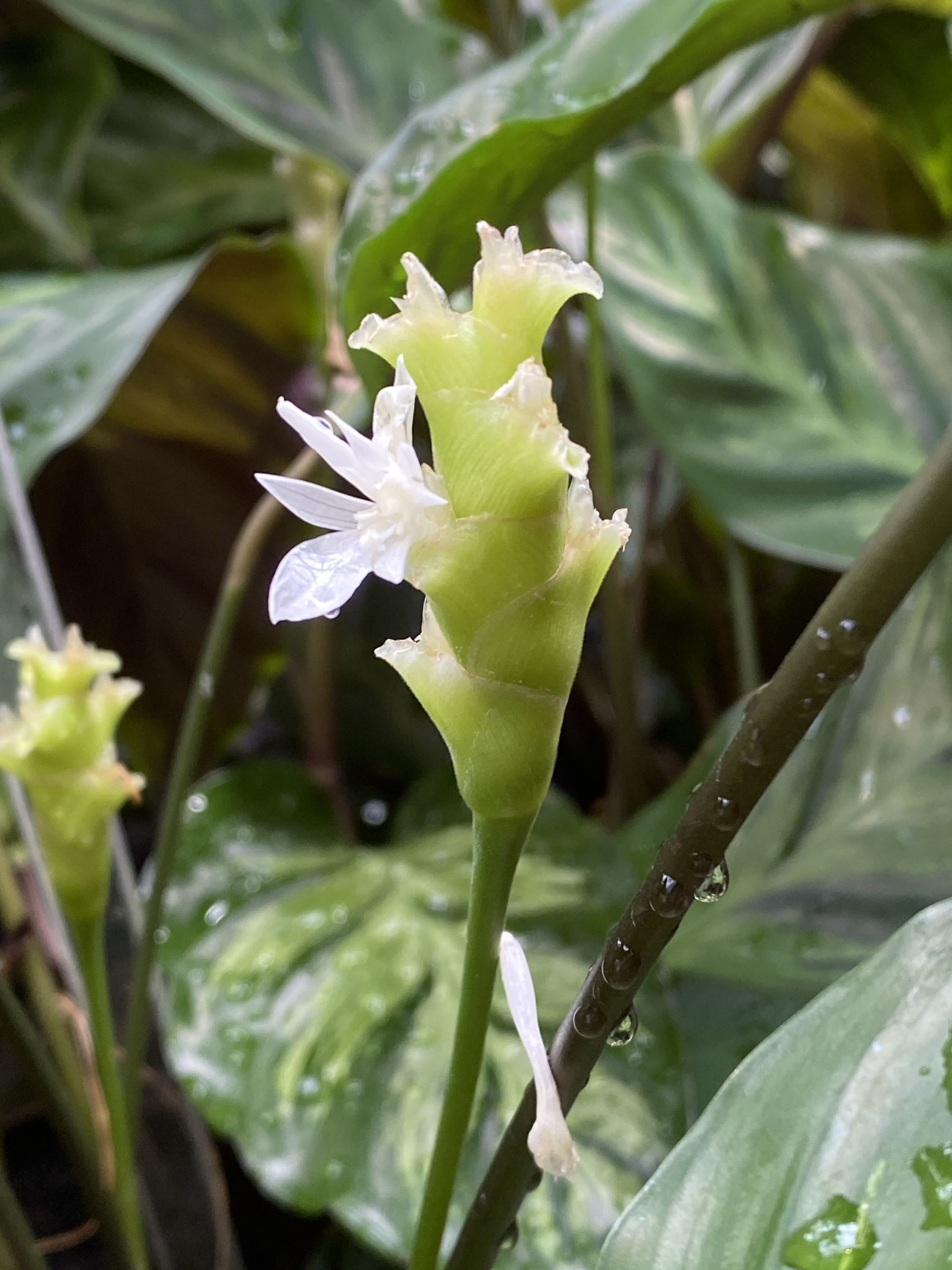
Inflorescence of Goeppertia albertii

Goeppertia albertii is a medium sized species with long green leaves with long, thin petioles and a long, brownish green pulvinus. It has a light green band pattern on the upper side of the leaves, going from the middle vein from the sides of the leaves. The underside of the leaves is purple but can sometimes be grey. The inflorescence of this species is made of multiple bracts on a thin, long, green peduncle. The flowers are entirely white.

== Cultivation ==
Goeppertia albertii has 4 cultivars known for now.

- Goeppertia albertii cv.White Fusion

- Goeppertia albertii cv.Stella

- Goeppertia albertii cv.Yellow Fusion

- Goeppertia albertii cv.Electric Shock

While those cultivars are often sold as Goeppertia lietzei in most of the market, they are in reality all cultivars of G. albertii. Proven by the inflorescences of those cultivars. G. lietzei does not have a massively sold variegated cultivar but it does exist.
