= Raffill =

Raffill is a surname. Notable people with the surname include:

- Charles Percival Raffill (1876–1951), British botanist
- Stewart Raffill, British writer and director
