= Frances Perry (gardener) =

British garden writer

- Born: 19 February 1907; Enfield England
- Died: 11 October 1993 (aged 86); Devon England
- Education: Wye College, Kent, UK
- Awards: MBE 1962; Veitch Memorial Medal 1964; VMH 1971

Frances Mary Perry MBE VMH (19 February 1907 – 11 October 1993) was an English gardener, administrator, writer and broadcaster.

== Biography ==
She was born Frances Everett in Enfield, Middlesex, where she lived most of her life at Bulls Cross. She was educated at Enfield County School and Swanley Horticultural College (now Wye College, part of the University of London).

Her mother took her as a child to the Chelsea Flower Show. Her next-door neighbour, E. A. Bowles, Vice-Chairman of the Council of the Royal Horticultural Society (RHS), guided her interest in plants and in 1927 recommended her to Amos Perry, a local plant nurseryman. She worked in Perry's Hardy Plant Farm, soon managing his water-plant department and helping with exhibits at the Chelsea Flower Show. She married Perry's son Gerald, (d.1964) an expert on ferns and water plants. Through her work with Amos Perry she became knowledgeable about hardy perennials and is known particularly for her writings about them.

From 1943 to 1953, she was horticultural adviser to Middlesex County Council and later principal organiser for agricultural and horticultural education in Middlesex. In 1953 she was appointed Principal of Norwood Hall College for adult education, a post she occupied until 1967.

In 1960, she sat on the Royal Commission on allotments. In 1968 she became the first woman council member of the RHS. The absence of women on the council had been fiercely debated in the letters column of The Times and in an editorial article. When Frances Perry was nominated she responded, "If you want me because I am a woman, the answer is no, but if you want me because of anything I have done in horticulture, the answer is yes." She became a vice-president of the Society in 1978.

In the 1960s, she became a champion of Capel Manor horticultural college near her home in Enfield and she continued to support it until her death

She contributed a gardening column to The Observer newspaper for over twenty years. She was a contributor to the BBC radio programme Home Grown, presented by Roy Hay and Fred Streeter in the two o'clock slot on Sunday afternoon later to be occupied by Gardener's Question Time, and she was one of the first TV gardening personalities.

On retirement from Norwood Hall she remained active in horticultural research. She visited over seventy countries, often in the company of Roy Hay (1910–1989), a long-standing gardening colleague, whom she married in 1977. One of her last major journeys was made at the age of 84, when she toured botanical gardens in Germany.

After the death of Roy Hay, Frances Perry left Enfield to live with her son in Devon.

== Honours and awards ==
Frances Perry received many honours for her work:

- MBE – 1962
- RHS's Veitch Memorial Medal in gold – awarded in 1964
- Victoria Medal of Honour – received in 1971, the RHS's highest honour
- Sara Frances Chapman Medal – received in 1973 from the Garden Club of America
- Hall of Fame Award from the International Water Lily Society

== Bibliography ==
Books by Frances Perry

- Herbaceous Borders (1949)
- Colour in the Garden (1951)
- The Woman Gardener (1955)
- Collins Guide to Border Plants (1957)
- Flowering Bulbs, Corms and Tubers (1966)
- Flowers of the World (in association with the RHS) (1972)
- Beautiful Leaved Plants
- Tropical and Sub-tropical Plants (with Roy Hay)
- The Water Garden ISBN 0-442-28259-1
- The Good Gardener's Guide
- The Garden Pool ISBN 0-7153-5393-4
- Gardening in Colour (1972)
- Complete Book of House Plants and Indoor Gardening ISBN 0-7064-0538-2
- Beautiful Leaved Plants ISBN 0-87923-316-8
- The Observer Book of Gardening ISBN 0-283-98780-4
- The Complete Book of Gardening (with Michael Wright, John E. Elsley and Lizzie Boyd) ISBN 0-7181-1555-4
- Macdonald Encyclopaedia of Plants and Flowers ISBN 0-354-04458-3
- Grown for Their Leaves ISBN 0-85967-661-7
- Beautiful Leaved Plants (1979) ISBN 0-85967-406-1
- Cacti And Succulents (1979) ISBN 0-7054-0566-4
- Australian Sketches (1984)
