= Nafas =

Nafas may refer to:

- Nafas (film)
- "Nafas" (song)
- Nafas (TV series)
- NAFAS, or National Association of Flower Arrangement Societies
