= William Crump (gardener) =

English gardener

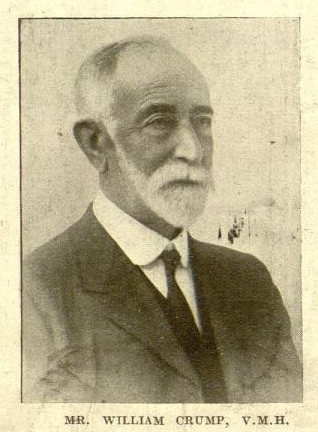

William Crump (27 January 1843 – 30 December 1932, Madresfield) was an English gardener who was head gardener at Madresfield Court, near Malvern. He was one of the first recipients of the Victorian Medal of Honour in 1897.

Crump was born in Pontesbury, Shropshire. He studied at the local national school and took an interest in gardening and despite other offers he stayed intent on gardening and eventually he began to work at Powis Castle, Welshpool under G. Brown followed by Heckfield Place under Mr Wildsmith and at Lamberhurst for F. Harris. He then worked in Blenheim Palace where he bred the Blenheim Orange Melon. He became a head gardener at Madresfield Court in 1883 and worked there for nearly 40 years. He developed a hybrid apple that is now named after him that was a cross between Cox's Orange Pippin and Worcester Pearmain. He was a manager of the local schools, a judge at exhibitions and an examiner for the Royal Horticultural Society. In 1887 he was one of 7 horticulturists to receive the Victorian Medal of Honour by Queen Victoria at her Golden Jubilee.
