= Victoria Medal of Honour =

Royal Horticultural Society award

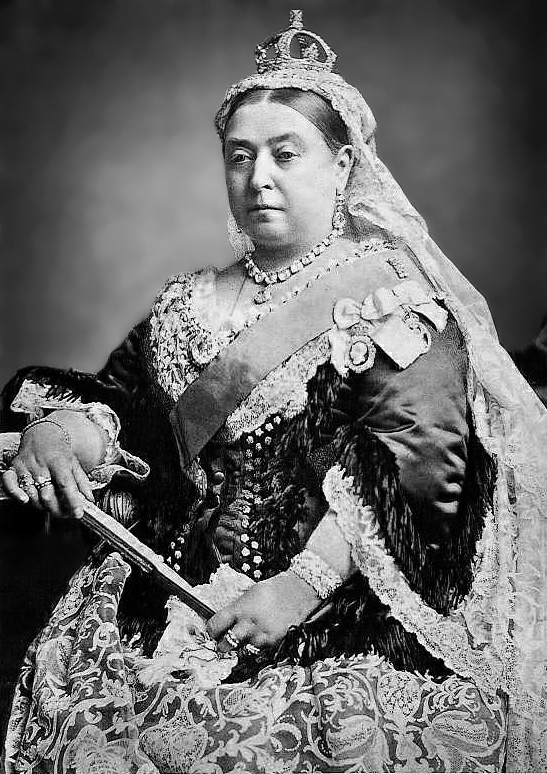
Queen Victoria, the medal’s namesake

The Victoria Medal of Honour (VMH) is awarded to British horticulturists resident in the United Kingdom whom the Royal Horticultural Society Council considers deserving of special honour by the Society.

The award was established in 1897 "in perpetual remembrance of Her Majesty's glorious reign, and to enable the Council to confer honour on British horticulturists." The Society's rules state that only sixty-three horticulturists can hold the VMH at any given time, in commemoration of the sixty-three years of Queen Victoria's reign. Therefore, the honour is not awarded every year, but may be made to multiple recipients in other years.

== Awards ==
=== 1897 – The first 60 medallists ===
The first 60 medals were awarded on 26 October 1897:

- John Gilbert Baker (1834–1920)
- Isaac Bayley Balfour (1853–1922)
- Peter Barr (1826–1909)
- Archibald F Barron (1835–1903)
- Edward John Beale (1835–1902)
- William Boxall (1844–1910)
- William Bull (1828–1902)
- George Bunyard (1841–1919)
- Frederick William Burbidge (1847–1905)
- William Crump (1843–1932)
- Richard Dean (1830–1905)
- George A Dickson (c1835 – 1909)
- Henry Honeywood D'ombrain (1818–1905)
- Charles Thomas Druery (1843–1917)
- Malcolm Dunn (1837–1899)
- Henry Nicholson Ellacombe (1822–1916)
- Henry John Elwes (1846–1922)
- Michael Foster (1836–1907)
- John Fraser (1821–1900)
- Paul George (1841–1921)
- George Gordon (1841–1914)
- John Heal (c1841 – 1925)
- George Henslow (1835–1925)
- Hermann Carl Gottlieb Herbst (c1830 – 1904)
- Samuel Reynolds Hole (1819–1904)
- Joseph Dalton Hooker (1817–1911)
- Francis Daltry Horner (c1838 – 1912)
- James Hudson (1846–1932)
- Gertrude Jekyll (1843–1932)
- Peter Edmund Kay (1853–1909)
- John Laing (1823–1900)
- Charles Maries (1851–1902)
- James McIndoe (1836–1910)
- Henry Ernest Milner (1845–1906)
- Edwin Molyneux (1851–1921)
- George Monro (c1847 – 1920)
- Frederick William Moore (1857–1949)
- Daniel Morris (1844–1933)
- George Nicholson (1847–1908)
- James O'Brien (1842–1930)
- William Paul (1822–1905)
- T Francis Rivers (1831–1899)
- Lionel Walter Rothschild (1868–1937)
- Frederick Sander (1847–1920)
- Henry Schröder (1824–1910)
- John Seden (1840–1921)
- Nathaniel Newman Sherwood (1846–1916)
- James Smith (1837–1903)
- Martin Ridley Smith (– 1908)
- Walter Speed (c1835 – 1921) Head Gardener at Penrhyn Castle, Wales
- Arthur Warwick Sutton (1854–1925)
- Owen Thomas (1843–1923)
- William Thompson (1823–1903)
- David Thomson (1823–1909)
- Harry Turner (c1848 – 1906)
- Ellen Willmott (1858–1934)
- George Fergusson Wilson (1822–1902)
- Charles Wolley-Dod (1826–1904)
- John Wright (1836–1916)
- George Wythes (1851–1916)

=== 1900–1909 ===
- 1900
  - George Herbert Engleheart (1851–1936) breeder of daffodils
  - Trevor Lawrence (1831–1913), President of the Royal Horticultural Society 1885 to 1913
- 1901
  - George King (1840–1909)
  - Eleanor Ormerod
  - James Sweet, Messrs J. Sweet & Sons Ltd, nurserymen, Whetstone
- 1902
  - Mordecai Cubitt Cooke (1825–1914), Mycologist
- 1903
  - Thomas Smith, Daisy Hill Nursery
  - Sir Thomas Hanbury
  - Thomas Humphreys (afterwards Curator of Birmingham Botanical Gardens)
- 1904
  - Edward Mawley (1842–1916)
- 1905
  - Henry Eckford (1823–1905)
- 1906
  - Richard Irwin Lynch (1850–1924), Curator of the Cambridge University Botanic Garden
  - Harry Veitch (1840–1924)
- 1909
  - William Botting-Hemsley (1843–1924). Keeper of the Herbarium and library, Kew Gardens.

=== 1910–1919 ===
- 1911
  - Charles Robert Fielder (1857-1946 Bramshaw)
- 1912
  - Ernest Henry Wilson (1876–1930)
- 1916
  - Edward Augustus Bowles (1865–1954)
- 1917
  - William Jackson Bean (1863–1947)
  - Frederick Chittenden (1873–1950), first Director of the RHS Wisley Garden.
  - Sir Herbert Eustace Maxwell (1845–1937)
  - Peter Veitch (1850–1929)

=== 1920–1929 ===
- 1921
  - George Forrest (1873–1932)
- 1922
  - Arthur Boscawen (1862–1935)
- 1924
  - Arthur Grove
- 1925
  - Samuel B. Dicks (1845–1926), seedsman
  - William Rickatson Dykes (1827–1925)
  - William Wright Smith (1875–1956)
  - George Yeld (1845–1938)
- 1926
  - Herbert George Alexander (orchid grower)
  - Frederick Vincent Theobald (1868–1930)
- 1927
  - Frederick Robert Stephen Balfour (1873–1945)
- 1928
  - W. Nelmes
- 1929
  - Sir William Lawrence (1870–1934), Lionel de Rothschild (1882–1942)

=== 1930–1939 ===
- 1931
  - Laura McLaren, Baroness Aberconway (1854–1933)
- 1933
  - George Percival Baker (1856–1951)
  - Frederick William Millard (1864–1964)
- 1934
  - Henry McLaren, 2nd Baron Aberconway (1879–1953)
  - George Monro (1876–1951)
- 1935
  - Amos Perry (1871–1953), of Perry's Plant Farm
- 1936
  - Stephenson Robert Clarke (1862–1948), of Borde Hill
  - James Comber (1866–1953), of Nymans, Handcross
  - Frederick Augustus Secrett (1886–1964)
- 1938
  - William Fleming Bewley (1891–1976)
  - Frederick George Preston (1882–1964).
- 1939
  - Charles Percival Raffill M.B.E.(1876–1951), Curator, Kew Gardens. Raffill was also honoured in 1934 as an Associate of Honour of the Royal Horticultural Society (AHRHS).

=== 1940–1949 ===
- 1940
  - Sir Frederick Claude Stern (1884–1967) – Highdown chalk garden
- 1941
  - Edwin Lawrence Hillier – Hillier Nurseries
- 1942
  - Lady Iris Lawrence
- 1943
  - Arthur Disbrowe Cotton
- 1944
  - Arthur Dorrien-Smith (1876–1955)
  - John Hutchinson (1884–1972)
- 1945
  - Fred Streeter (1879–1975) – horticulturalist and broadcaster
- 1946
  - Vera Higgins (1892–1962)
- 1948
  - Wilfrid Fox (1875–1962) – Winkworth Arboretum
- 1949
  - Ernest Ballard (1870–1952)
  - Harry Higgott Thomas (1876–1956) – Editor of Popular Gardening

=== 1950–1959 ===
- 1951
  - Peter Crichton Kay (1889–1954)
- 1952
  - Albert Maurice Amsler (1877–1952)
  - Collingwood Ingram (1880-1981)
  - Thomas Wallace (1891–1965)
- 1953
  - Archibald Park Balfour
  - Sir David Bowes-Lyon (1902–1961)
  - C Edward Hudson
- 1954
  - Raymond Henry Stoughton (1903–1979)
- 1955
  - Robert L. Scarlett: for his contributions to horticultural experimental work in Scotland & United Kingdom.
  - Lilian Snelling (1879–1972)
- 1957
  - William MacDonald Campbell
  - Harold Roy Fletcher(1907–1978), Keeper of the Royal Botanic Garden Edinburgh
  - John Scott Lennox Gilmour (1906–1995)
  - Harold Hillier (1905–1985) – Hillier Nurseries
- 1958
  - Frank P. Knight (1903–1985), Director of Wisley Garden

=== 1960–1969 ===
- 1960
  - Maurice Mason (1912–1993)
- 1961
  - Sir Edward Bolitho of Trengwainton, Penzance
  - Queen Elizabeth the Queen Mother (1900–2002)
  - William Gregor MacKenzie, curator of Chelsea Physic Garden
  - Thomas Hope Findlay (1910-1994) Keeper of Gardens Windsor Great Park 1943-1975
  - Charles McLaren, 3rd Baron Aberconway (1913–2003)
- 1963
  - S. Millar Gault
  - Sir James Horlick (1886–1972) of The Island of Gigha
- 1964
  - Gwendolyn Anley
  - Hans Hvass – Danish writer on natural history
- 1965
  - John Paul Wellington Furse (1904–1978)
  - Beatrix Havergal (1901–1980)
  - William T. Stearn (1911–2001)
- 1967
  - Arthur Hellyer (1902–1993) – RHS. Horticultural writer and journalist.
  - Sir Giles Rolls Loder, 3rd Baronet (1914–1999) of Leonardslee, Lower Beeding, Horsham
- 1968
  - Graham Stuart Thomas (1909–2003)

=== 1970–1979 ===
- 1970
  - Roy Hay (1910–1989)
  - Alan F. Mitchell (1922–1995)
- 1971
  - Alan Bloom (1906–2005)
  - Frances Perry (1907–1993)
  - Patrick Synge (1910–1982)
- 1973
  - Julia Clements
- 1974
  - Roy Copeman Elliott (Alpine gardener)
  - Martin O. Slocock
- 1975
  - Herbert Rawnsley Barr (1903–1987)
  - Valerie Finnis (1924–2006)
- 1976
  - Christopher D. Brickell
  - John Pilkington Hudson (1910–2007)
  - Lady Marie Loder of Leonardslee, Lower Beeding, Horsham
- 1977
  - Percy Thrower (1913–1988), Television gardener
  - Mrs Desmond Underwood
- 1978
  - W Martin Robinson, vegetable expert.
- 1979
  - Christopher Lloyd (1921–2006)

=== 1980–1989 ===
- 1980
  - Leonard Broadbent (1916–2002) – Professor in Biology at the University of Bath
  - Sheila Macqueen – Flower arranger
- 1981
  - John Bond (1932–2001) – Keeper of Windsor Great Park and the Savill Gardens
  - Sir John Heathcoat-Amory, 3rd Baronet (1894–1972) and Lady Heathcoat-Amory (1901–1997)
- 1982
  - Adrian Frank Posnette
- 1983
  - John Stewart Mattock
- 1984
  - Kath Dryden (−2009) – alpine plant expert
- 1985
  - Adrian Bloom – Bressingham Steam and Gardens
  - Douglas Mackay Henderson (1927–2007), Keeper, Royal Botanic Gardens Edinburgh
  - Fred Whitsey (1919–2009)- Gardening correspondent of The Daily Telegraph
- 1986
  - Lady Anne Berry (1919–2019)
  - Robin A.E. Herbert (1934–2024) Former President of RHS
  - John B. Simmons (1937–)
- 1987
  - William Lawrence Banks
  - Beth Chatto (1923–2018)
- 1988
  - Roy Lancaster (1937–)
- 1989
  - Carolyn Hardy (1930–2016)- Chairman, National Gardens Scheme
  - A.D. Schilling

=== 1990–1999 ===
- 1990
  - Sylvia Crowe(1901–1997)
  - D.J. Fuller
- 1991
  - P. Cox
  - Brian Mathew
  - Frederick Alkmund Roach (1909–2004)
  - Miriam Rothschild (1908–2005)
  - D.J. Sales
- 1993
  - Alan Hardy (1926–1999) – Sandling Estate
  - Mary Shirville Newnes (1926–2020) – flower arranger
  - Charles Notcutt (1935–2015)
- 1994
  - Sir Geoffrey Jellicoe (1900–1996) – landscape designer
  - James Smart – of Marwood Hill Garden
- 1995
  - Raymond J Evison (1944–)
  - David McClintock (1913–2001)
  - Helen Robinson (1919–2004) – Hyde Hall
- 1996
  - John G. Hillier – Hillier Nurseries (1935-2025)
  - Penelope Hobhouse (1929–)
  - C.R.M. Notcutt
- 1997
  - J.W. Blanchard
  - Mary Grierson (1912–2012) – Botanical artist
  - John Palmer, Earl of Selborne
- 1998
  - Joyce Stewart (1936–2011) – Director of Horticulture, RHS
  - Rosemary Verey (1918–2001)
- 1999
  - Hal Moggridge
  - A. Moon
  - Sir Ghillean Tolmie Prance (1937–)
  - G.H. Rae

=== 2000–2009 ===
- 2001
  - P. Erskine
- 2002
  - David Austin (1926–2018) for his rose breeding
- 2003
  - Peter Beales (1936–2013) for his rose breeding and media promotion of gardening
  - Andrew Dunn for his pioneering of virus-free rootstock
  - Peter Seabrook (1935–2022) for his rose breeding
- 2004
  - Ray Bilton for his work with orchid hybrids
  - David S. Ingram (1941–) for his pioneering research into plant diseases
  - Alan Titchmarsh for his broadcasting and authorial gardening educational outreach
- 2005
  - Martin Lane Fox for his work in landscape garden design
  - Tony Lord for his work as a garden photographer and horticultural consultant
  - Edmund Leopold de Rothschild for his work with rhododendron hybrids
  - Tom Wood for his administrative work promoting horticulture
- 2006
  - Jim Buttress, for his work as a garden show judge
  - Sibylle Kreutzberger, for her work at Sissinghurst Castle in Kent
  - Dr. Henry Oakeley, for his scientific work on orchids, the genera Lycaste, Ida and Anguloa
  - Pamela Schwerdt, for her work at Sissinghurst Castle in Kent
- 2007
  - Colin Ellis – "for his long and distinguished service since 1983 with RHS Council and numerous committees."
  - Christopher Grey-Wilson – for "his many achievements as botanist, photographer, botanical explorer and author of many books and articles."
  - Sir Richard Carew Pole (1938–2024) – former RHS President
  - Brian Self – "for his lifetime of service to amateur and professional fruit growers."
- 2008
  - John Ravenscroft – "for his plantsmanship, entrepreneurial talent and encyclopaedic knowledge of plants."
- 2009
  - Charles Baring, 2nd Baron Howick of Glendale
  - Charles III – "for his passion for plants, sustainable gardening and the environment."
  - John Humphris
  - Lady Christine Skelmersdale

=== 2010–present ===
- 2010
  - Peter R. Dawson
  - Michael Hickson
  - Robert T. Hillier
  - John Massey – "for his valuable contribution to plantbreeding "
  - Dowager Marchioness Salisbury
- 2011
  - Giles Coode-Adams
  - Maurice C. Foster
  - Richard Webb
- 2012
  - Stephen Blackmore
  - Alice Boyd, Viscountess of Merton
  - David Clark
  - John Parker
- 2013
  - Nigel Colborn
  - Brian Humphrey
- 2014
  - Chris Sanders
- 2015 Not awarded
- 2016
  - Mark Flanagan (posthumously)
  - Johan Hermans
- 2017
  - Nick Dunn
  - Jekka McVicar – RH Vice-President
- 2018
  - Peter Catt
  - Carol Klein
  - Charles Williams
- 2019
  - Fergus Garrett
  - Tony Kirkham
  - Bill Simpson
- 2020
  - Christopher Bailes
  - Jim Gardiner
  - Jim (James) McColl
- 2022
  - Monty Don
  - Brian Duncan
  - Peter Thoday
- 2023
  - Jim Marshall
  - Paul Phillips
  - Jon Wheatley
- 2024
  - Jan Pennings
  - Chris Lane
  - Neil Lucas
- 2025
  - Sarah Cook
  - Martyn Rix
  - Ron Scamp
- 2026
  - Jennifer Trehane
  - Philip McMillan Browse
  - Linda Philip
  - Chris Baines
  - Matt Biggs

== See also ==
- List of agriculture awards
