= Peter Posnette =

British plant pathologist

Adrian Frank Posnette CBE
- Born: 11 January 1914; Kings Norton, England
- Died: 17 July 2004 (aged 90)
- Education: Christ's College, Cambridge
- Known for: Plant pathology
- Spouse: Isabelle La Roche
- Awards: CBE(1976); Fellow of the Royal Society (1971); Victoria Medal of Honour (1982)

Peter Posnette (real name Adrian Frank Posnette) CBE FRS VMH (11 January 1914 – 17 July 2004) was a British plant pathologist.

== Early life and education ==
He was educated at Pate's Grammar School Cheltenham and Christ's College, Cambridge. Posnette was a keen sportsman in his youth being a member of Pate's First X1 at football and cricket and playing football at University. He played several games for Bedouins, a 'touring' association football team that drew the majority of their players from universities.

== Career ==
On leaving university in 1935, he joined the Colonial Agricultural Service and gained a research scholarship at Imperial College of Tropical Agriculture in Trinidad. Posnette made his name in West Africa, 1937-49, where his work helped preserve the cocoa crop through the development of the more disease resistant hybrid Trinitaro plants and led to him being dubbed 'the Father of Modern Chocolate.

He returned to UK to work at the East Malling Research Station on solutions to disease in plants such as apples and strawberries. He became Head of Plant Pathology at East Malling in 1957 and Deputy Director of the station in 1972. He was also visiting Professor of Plant Sciences at Wye College, then part of the University of London.

== Honours and awards ==
He was appointed CBE in the 1976 Birthday Honours, elected a Fellow of the Royal Society in 1971 and awarded the Royal Horticultural Society's Victoria Medal of Honour in 1982. A sculpture of Peter Posnette in conversation with Prof Geoffrey Emett Blackman, sculpted by Blackman's wife Audrey, is displayed in the Fellows Rooms at the Royal Society.
