= Vera Higgins =

British botanist (1892-1968)

Vera Higgins (1892–1968) was a British botanist, author, translator and botanical illustrator known for being an authority on succulents and cacti, particularly Crassulaceae. She graduated from Cambridge University and worked at the National Physical Laboratory. Higgins was the first editor of The Cactus Journal of the Cactus & Succulent Society of Great Britain, beginning in 1931 and continuing until 1939 when the Society closed because of World War II. She then edited the Journal of the Royal Horticultural Society between 1939 - 1945. She was elected a fellow of the Linnean Society of London in 1945 and was awarded the Royal Horticultural Society Victoria Medal of Honour in 1946.

Her drawings are housed at the Royal Horticultural Society. The standard author abbreviation V.Higgins is used to indicate this person as the author when citing a botanical name.

Among the books that she wrote and illustrated are:

- Naming of Plants by Vera Higgins 1937 E. A. Arnold and Co.
- Study of Cacti by Vera Higgins 1950 Blandford Press
- Rock gardens and their plants by Wilhelm Schacht, translated and edited by Vera Higgins. 1963 Blandford Press
- Succulents in Cultivation by Vera Higgins 1964 Blandford Press

Plant varieties named after her include:

- × Graptosedum 'Vera Higgins', an intergeneric hybrid succulent between Graptopetalum paraguayense and Sedum stahlii.
