= James Hudson (gardener) =

English gardener and horticulturist

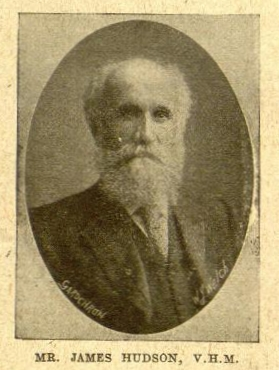

James Hudson (29 May 1846 – 28 May 1932) was an English gardener and horticulturist who was the first recipient of the Victoria Medal of Honour in Horticulture.

The youngest son of Samuel Hudson, head gardener at Horsted Place, James studied at Doctor Saunder's grammar school, Uckfield and then trained in land survey and estate work in 1861. He chose to work with his father before becoming a foreman at Deepdene, Dorking. He topped the Royal Horticultural Society examination in 1869 with full marks, the first such case in the history of the examinations. He became a head gardener at Champion Hill and then at Gunnersbury House owned by H.J.Atkinson. He then worked for Leopold de Rothschild who purchased the estate. He served as an examiner for the RHS and was awarded the Victoria Medal of Honour in Horticulture as soon as it was instituted. He retired in 1919.
