= John Mattock =

English rose grower (1926-2017)

John Stewart Mattock
- Born: 23 April 1926; Oxford
- Died: 23 October 2017 (aged 91)
- Occupation: Rose Grower

John Stewart Mattock (23 April 1926 – 23 October 2017) was an English rose grower, and the chairman of the Chelsea Flower Show for twelve years.

He was born in Oxford, the eldest child of John and Marita Mattock; his father was a master rose grower. He joined the Royal Navy in 1944 and took part in the D-Day landings as an electrician on a landing craft, rejoining the family business after the war to run the Mattock rose gardens in Headington. He helped to grow the turnover tenfold, after which the family opened a garden centre at Nuneham Courteney, which became the firm's head office. They exhibited at the Chelsea Flower Show, winning several medals, and Mattock became chairman of the show.

He retired in the late 1980s and sold the business to Notcutts Garden Centre. In retirement he lectured and wrote, publishing such books as "The Reader's Digest Gardener's Guide to Growing Roses" and "Growing and Displaying Roses".

In 1983 he was awarded the Victoria Medal of Honour of the Royal Horticultural Society

He died aged 91 in 2017 and was buried at St Andrew's Church in Sandford-on-Thames. He had married twice;firstly Sheila Weatherley and secondly Sheila Port and had two daughters.
