= Nancy Tait =

British health and safety activist

Nancy Tait (February 12, 1920 – February 13, 2009), born in Enfield, London was a health and safety activist and campaigner who sought to raise awareness of the health risks associated with exposure to asbestos.

== Early life ==
Nancy Tait was born Nancy Clark on 12 February 1920. Her father was a compositor, and she was educated at Enfield County School, a girls' grammar school. She then worked for the Civil Service. During the Second World War she was assigned to the Post Office. While working there she met her future husband William Ashton Tait. They married in 1943 and had a son, John, by the end of the war. After the war she worked variously as a teacher, at the Patent Office, and as an administrator at London University.

== Motivation for Activism ==
Her husband Bill continued to work for the Post Office after the war. In 1968 he died of pleural mesothelioma. The link between asbestos and mesothelioma had only been recently established at the time, and Bill had not worked directly with the compound, though he had been exposed to it. The Post Office did not accept that he had acquired an industrial disease as a result of his work, and refused to accept liability for the condition that led to his death.

Following her husband's death, Nancy began a campaign to seek recognition that he died of an industrial disease. Over the following forty years this campaign broadened to cover other diseases and conditions caused by working conditions. She became an expert in asbestos-related diseases, and lobbied continuously for better treatment for sufferers and legal acknowledgement of liabilities incurred by employers who had exposed their staff to asbestos. She represented the families of asbestos victims at inquests and in appeals against the DHSS's refusal to meet claims for industrial disablement benefit.

== Writings and collaborations ==
Nancy Tait taught herself about asbestos, then began to write her own asbestos literature. In 1976 she published the booklet "Asbestos Kills". This generated additional interest in her campaign, as did the award of a Churchill fellowship, which allowed her to visit a wide range of experts to collect information in support of her work. Through her diligent research skills, she became a published co-author of scientific papers on the topic of asbestos and health.

Angered by the asbestos industry's response to the rising scrutiny of the magic mineral’s safety record, Nancy Tait established an asbestos action group in 1978, the Society for the Prevention of Asbestosis and Industrial Diseases (SPAID), the first of a string of asbestos action groups and asbestos victims support groups worldwide. SPAID lobbied for tighter asbestos controls, for fairer compensation, for better death reporting and asbestos death statistics, and supported those affected by asbestos in their endeavours to claim industrial injuries benefits and/or compensation from past employers. From 1988, SPAID ran its own electron microscope laboratory, with whose aid Tait advised special medical boards on respiratory diseases and coroners on the assessment of the presence of asbestos fibres in lung tissue. The instrument was, she stated in 1999, the only bulwark against [certain medical experts’] efforts to secure verdicts of natural causes or open verdicts. From 1996 SPAID operated under the name Occupational and Environmental Diseases Association (OEDA).

Tait also collaborated with artist Conrad Atkinson on statement artworks speaking out against asbestos disease.

In addition to the Churchill fellowship, Tait was awarded an MBE in 1996 and an honorary doctorate from Southampton University in 1999. In 2005 the Institution of Occupational Safety and Health awarded her the Sypol Lifetime Achievement Award. She died on 13 February 2009; she was survived by a son, a sister and a brother.

The extensive OEDA archive is deposited with the University of Strathclyde.
