= Julia Clements =

English flower arranger and writer (1906–2010)

- Born: Gladys Agnes Clements; 11 April 1906
- Died: 1 November 2010 (aged 104)
- Citizenship: English
- Known for: Flower arranger, book writer

Julia Clements OBE (born Gladys Agnes Clements; 11 April 1906 – 1 November 2010) was an English flower arranger and lecturer on floral arranging whose career spanned over 60 years. She wrote some 20 bestselling books on the subject of flower arranging, as well as contributing to a variety of publications on gardening. For 12 years, she wrote a column for Popular Gardening.

Clements married Sir Alexander Hay Seton, 10th Baronet of Abercorn (1904–1963) in 1962, thus becoming Lady Seton, though she continued to be known as Julia Clements professionally.

Clements remained active in floral art and horticulture until the end of her life, and in 2009, at the age of 103, she was the guest of honour at the Festival of Flowers at Westminster Abbey to celebrate the fiftieth anniversary of the National Association of Flower Arrangement Societies. She died the following year from heart failure at a nursing home in Battersea, London.

She was awarded the Victoria Medal of Honour by the Royal Horticultural Society in 1973.

== Bibliography ==
- Fun with Flowers (1950)
- Pictures with Flowers (1951)
- 101 Ideas for Flower Arrangement (1953)
- First Steps with Flowers (1955)
- My Roses (1958)
- Floral Roundabout (1959)
- A Treasury of Rose Arrangements (1959)
- Party Pieces (1960)
- Show Pieces (1962)
- ABC of Flower Arranging (1963)
- Flower Arrangements in Stately Homes (1966)
- Julia Clements' Gift Book of Flower Arranging (1969)
- Flower Arrangements (1976)
- Flowers in Praise: Church Festivals and Decorations (1977)
- The Art of Arranging a Flower (1981)
- Flower Arranging (1981)
- Flower Arranger's Bedside Book (1982)
- Arco Julia Clements Book of Rose Arrangements (1984)
- Flower Arrangements: Month by Month, Step by Step (1985)
- Flower Arranging for All Occasions (1993)
- My Life with Flowers (1993)

*Flower Arranging Made Easy (1995)
