= Lakeside Nature Reserve =

Nature reserve in Finchley, London, England

Coordinates: 51.5994°N 0.1850°W

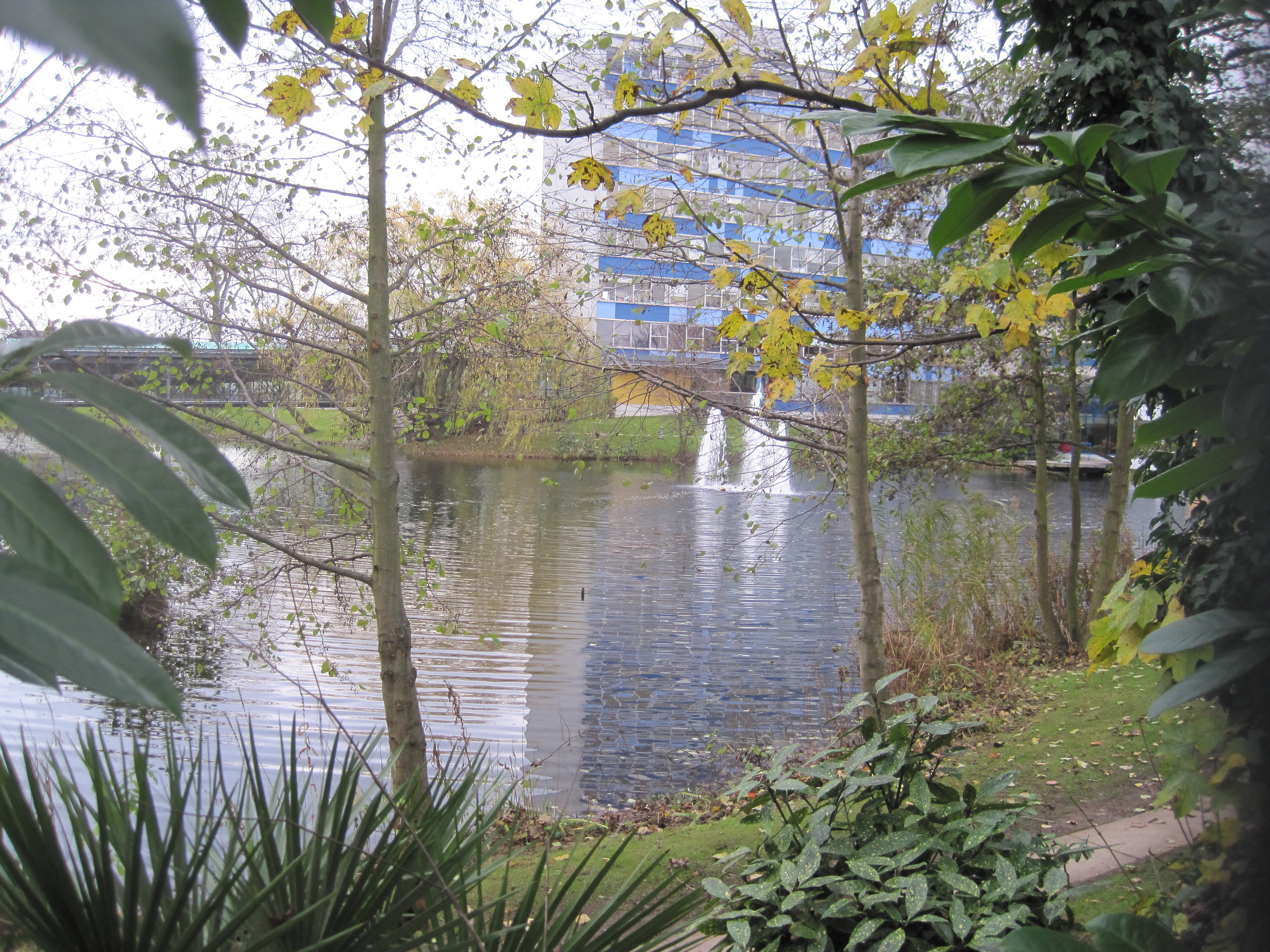

Lakeside Nature Reserve is a small Site of Local Importance for Nature Conservation in Church End, Finchley in the London Borough of Barnet. Its main feature is a pond which was constructed in the late 1890s by Peter Edmund Kay as a reservoir to store rainwater for commercial greenhouses in the Claigmar Vineyard, a large market garden in the late nineteenth and early twentieth centuries. The pond has a fountain and plants fringing the shore include water mint, gypsywort and purple-loosestrife. Waterfowl nest on a small island, and dragonflies are present in the summer.

There is no public access but it can be viewed from a footpath off Strathmore Gardens.
