= Edward Mawley =

English meteorologist and horticulturalist

Edward Mawley (14 May 1842 – 15 September 1916) was an English meteorologist and horticulturalist.

Educated at the South Kensington School of Art, Mawley practised architecture for several years. In 1874–1875, he and a friend went on a round-trip voyage to Australia on SS Sobraon; on this voyage Mawley made meteorological measurements with a thermometer. In 1876 he joined the Royal Meteorological Society and served as its President in 1896 and 1897. He made important modifications to the Stevenson screen for meteorological instruments.

He was Secretary of the National Rose Society from 1877 to 1914 and its President in 1915. He was the co-author with Gertrude Jekyll of the 1902 book Roses for English Gardens. In 1904 he was awarded the Victoria Medal of Honour by the Royal Horticultural Society.
