= Mary Shirville =

British author and flower arranger (1926–2020)

Mary Shirville (5 February 1926 – 25 December 2020) was an author and flower arranger. She was co-author of the constitution of the National Association of Flower Arrangement Societies (NAFAS) in the UK and its national chair from 1983 until 1985.

== Biography ==
Mary Jeyes Nelson was born near Birmingham, UK. After finishing her education, she was employed by Birmingham City Council, the Inland Revenue, and as a cook in a private school. She married Bill Gough in 1952, and this began her involvement with flower arranging. She joined the Solihull Horticultural Society and started to organise their flower shows. She was subsequently a founder of the Knowle Flower Club. In 1959, in collaboration with her husband, Shirville wrote the constitution of the new National Association of Flower Arrangement Societies.

Shirville subsequently held positions in several flower arranging societies. She was the first Chair of the NAFAS South Midlands area in 1962. From 1983 until 1985, she was the national chair of NAFAS and was awarded its National Associate of Honour. The Mary Gough Salver is awarded in the floral art section at the Monmouthshire Show.

In 1983, Shirville joined the RHS Review Committee and was awarded an RHS Honorary Fellow in recognition of her contribution to the review of the society's governance and activities. She served on the RHS Council from 1988 until 1995. She was awarded the RHS Victoria Medal of Honour in 1993. Shirville served on several other committees until 2004, including as chair of the Floral Arrangement Committee.

Her first husband died in 1970, and she remarried first Maurice Newnes and then Paul Shirville in 1995 (deceased 13 December 2006).

== Publications ==
Shirville was editor of the NAFAS South Midlands area magazine between 1968 and 1973.

She edited The Nafas Book of Flower Arranging. A Step-by-Step Guide to Decorating Your Home with Flowers, 1986, ISBN 978-0207154027, and was the author of Arranging Everlasting Flowers: a step by step guide to creating spectacular flower arrangements, NAFAS/Ebury Press, 1987 ISBN 978-0852236277.
