= Stevenson screen =

Enclosure for meteorological devices

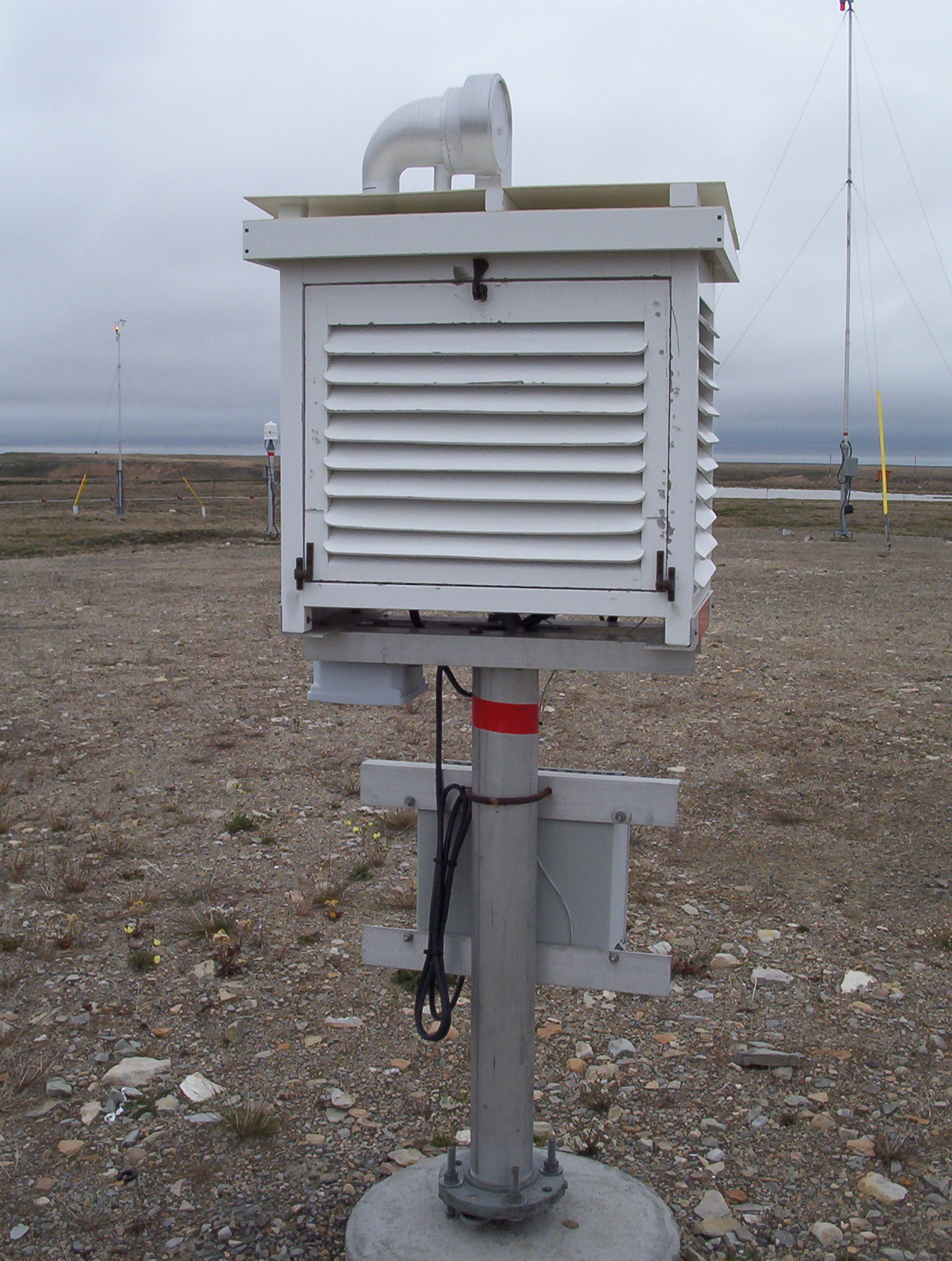
Exterior of a Stevenson screen

A Stevenson screen, or instrument shelter, is a shelter or an enclosure used to protect meteorological instruments against precipitation and direct heat radiation from outside sources, while still allowing air to circulate freely around them. It forms part of a standard weather station and holds instruments such as thermometers, hygrometers, and barometers.

A Stevenson screen may also be called a cotton region shelter, an instrument shelter, a thermometer shelter, a thermoscreen, or a thermometer screen. Its purpose is to provide a standardised environment in which to measure temperature, humidity, dewpoint, and atmospheric pressure. It is white in color to reflect direct solar radiation.

== History ==
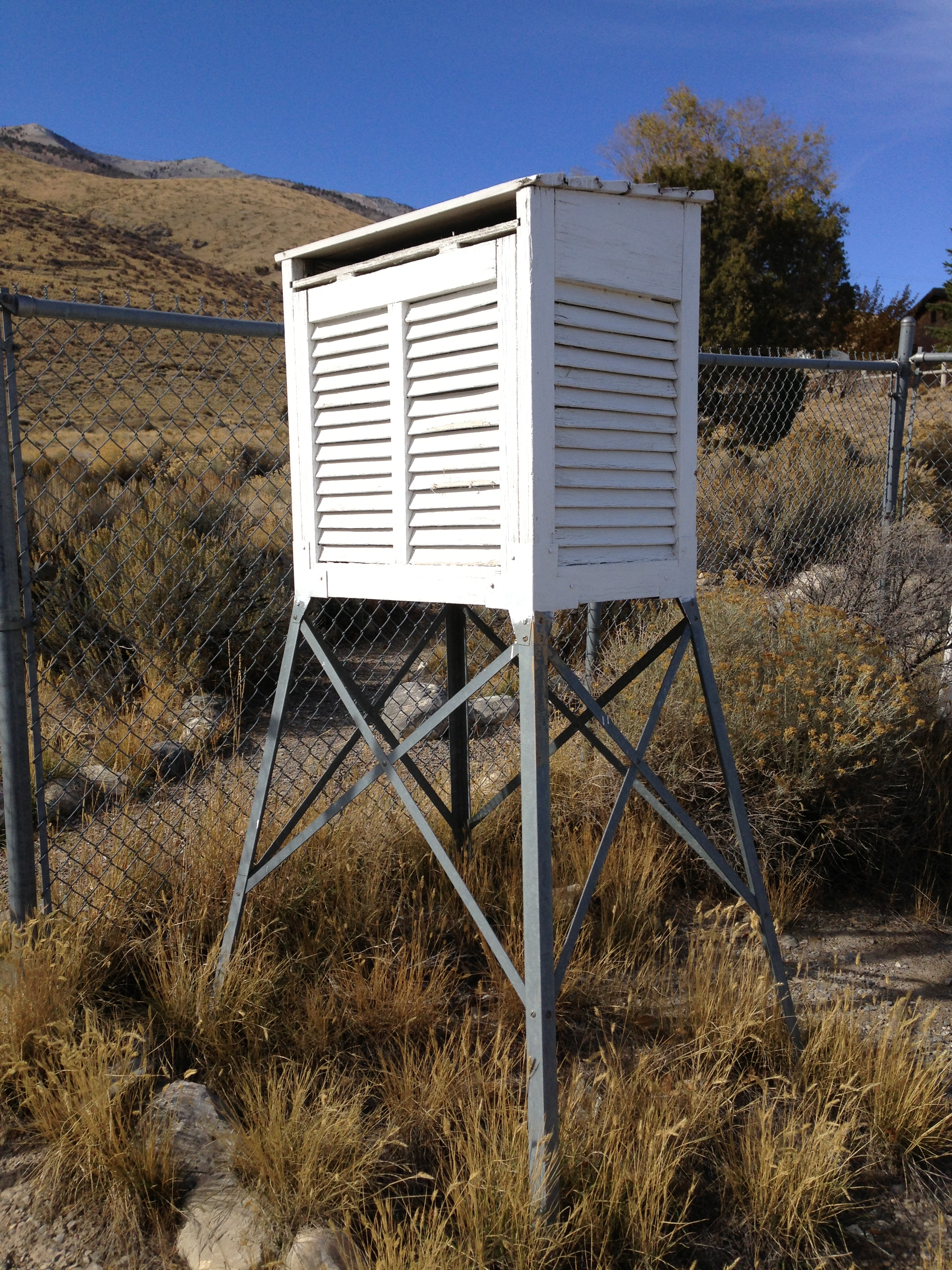
American variant (cotton region shelter)

The Stevenson screen was designed by Thomas Stevenson (1818–1887), a Scottish civil engineer who designed many lighthouses and was the father of author Robert Louis Stevenson. The development of his small thermometer screen with double-louvered walls on all sides and no floor was reported in 1864. After comparisons with other screens in the United Kingdom, Stevenson's original design was modified.

Modifications by Edward Mawley of the Royal Meteorological Society in 1884 included a double roof, a floor with slanted boards, and a modification of the double louvers. This design was adopted by the British Meteorological Office and, eventually, other national services, such as that of Canada. The national services developed their own variations, such as the single-louvered cotton region shelter design in the United States.

== Composition ==
The traditional Stevenson screen is a box shape, constructed of wood, in a double-louvered design. However, it is possible to construct a screen using other materials and shapes, such as a pyramid. The World Meteorological Organization (WMO) agreed standard for the height of the thermometers is between 1.25 and 2 m (4 ft 1 in and 6 ft 7 in) above the ground.

== Size ==
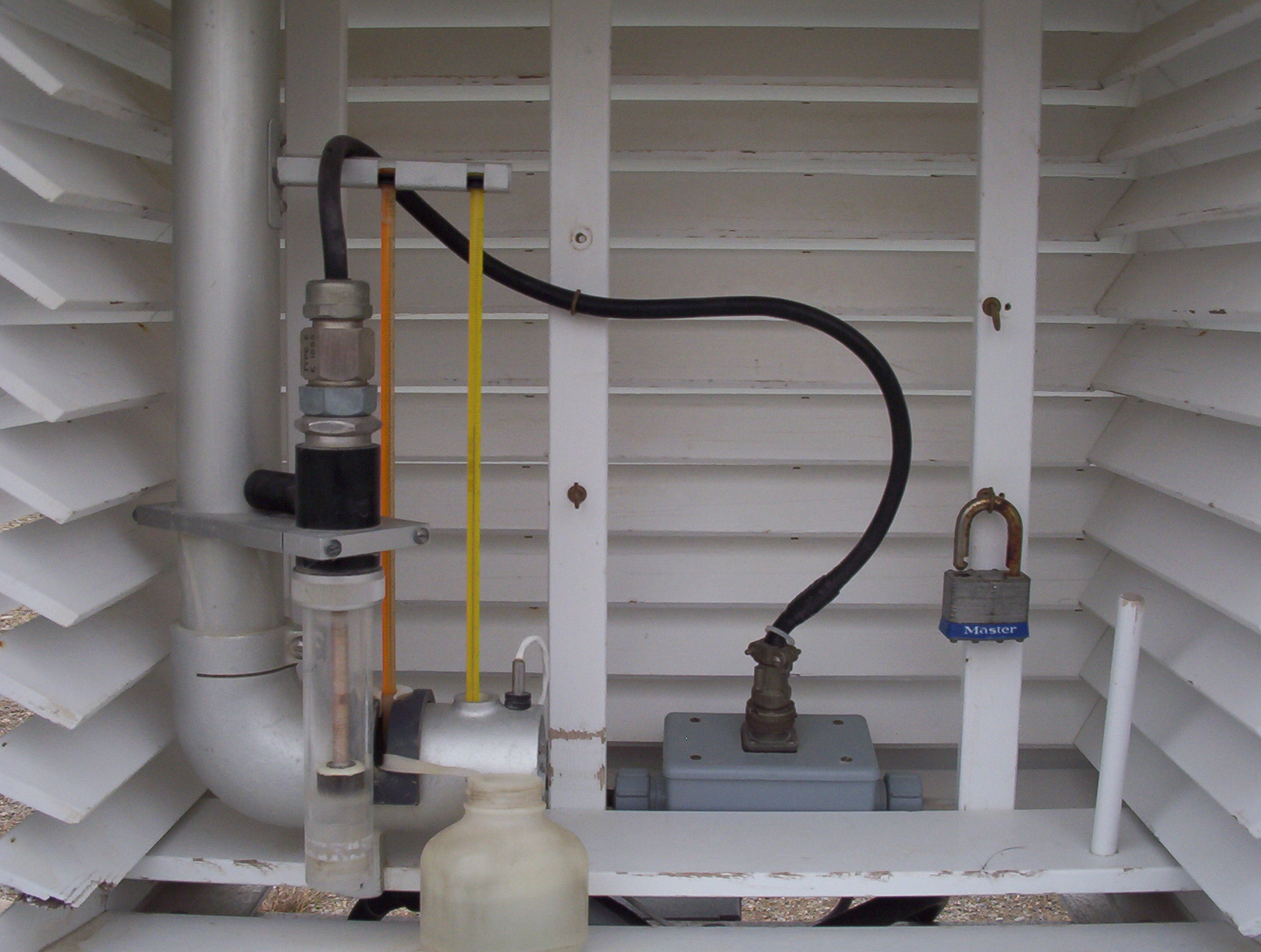
Interior of a Stevenson screen

The interior size of the screen will depend on the number of instruments that are to be used. A single screen may measure 76.5 by 61 by 59.3 cm (30.1 by 24.0 by 23.3 in) and a double screen 76.5 by 105 by 59.3 cm (30.1 by 41.3 by 23.3 in).

The top of the screen was originally composed of two asbestos boards with an air space between them. These asbestos boards have generally been replaced by a laminate for health and safety reasons. The whole screen is painted with several coats of white to reflect sunlight radiation, and usually requires repainting every two years.

== Siting ==
The siting of the screen is very important to avoid data degradation by the effects of ground cover, buildings and trees: WMO 2010 recommendations, if incomplete, are a sound basis. In addition, Environment Canada, for example, recommends that a screen be placed at at least twice as far away from any object as the object’s height, e.g. 20 m (66 ft) from any tree that is 10 m (33 ft) high.

In the northern hemisphere, the door of the screen should always face north so as to prevent direct sunlight on the thermometers. In polar regions with twenty-four-hour sunlight, the observer must take care to shield the thermometers from the sun and at the same time avoid a rise in temperature being caused by the observer's body heat.

A special type of Stevenson screen with an eye bolt on the roof is used on ships. The unit is hung from above and remains vertical despite the movement of the vessel.

== Future ==
In some areas the use of single-unit automatic weather stations is supplanting the Stevenson screen and other standalone meteorological equipment.
