= Tony Kirkham =

British botanist

Tony Kirkham MBE VMH
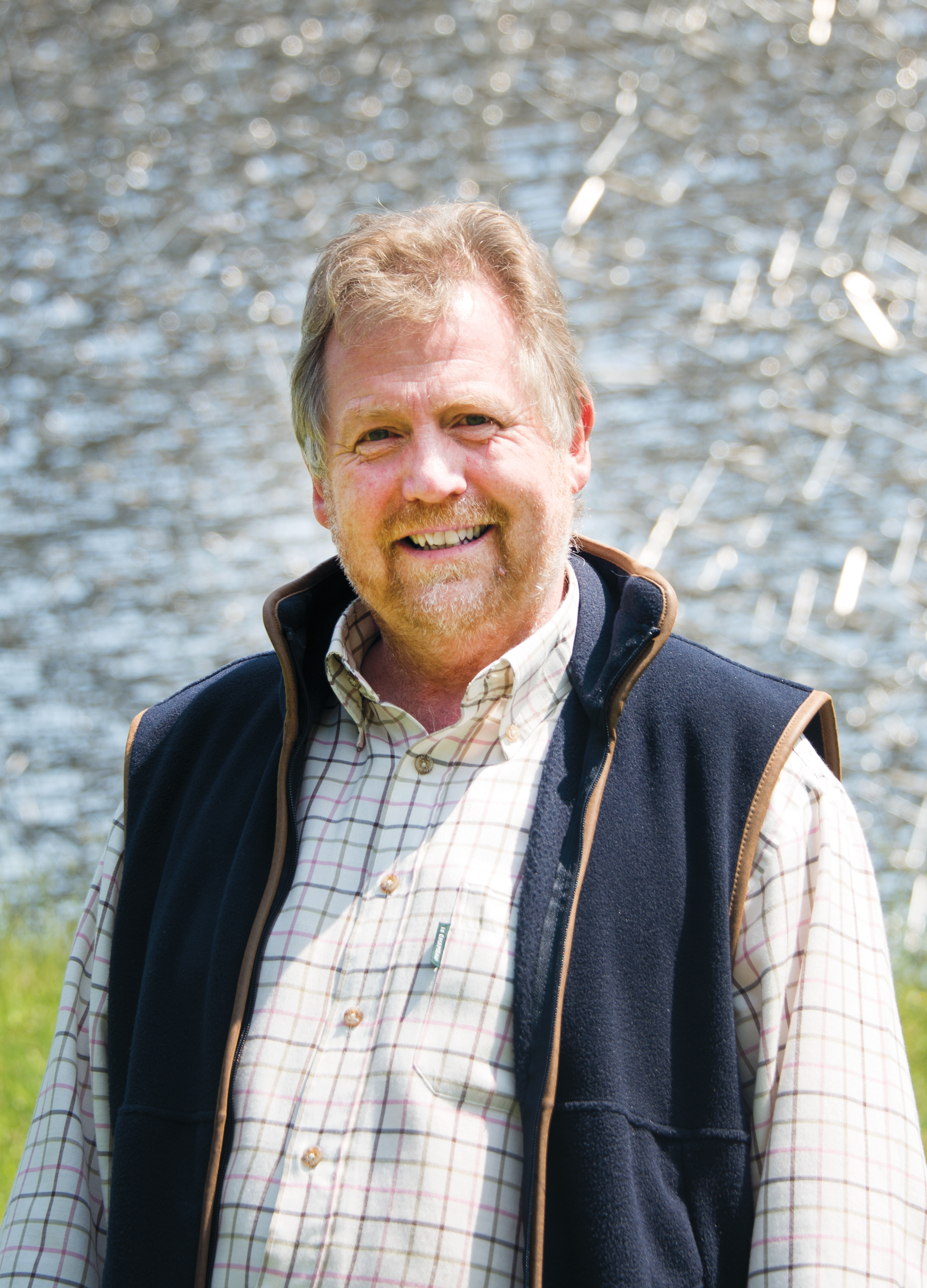
- Born: Lancashire, England
- Occupation: Botanist

Tony Kirkham MBE VMH is the former Head of the Arboretum, Gardens & Horticulture Services, Royal Botanic Gardens, Kew.

Among many accolades received during his career, he was awarded in 2009 the Associate of Honour by the Royal Horticultural Society (RHS), and in 2019, the Victoria Medal of Honour (VMH), established in 1897 "in perpetual remembrance of Her Majesty's glorious reign, and to enable the RHS Council to confer honour on British horticulturists."

== Career ==
Born in Lancashire, England, Tony Kirkham moved to Surrey to become, at the age of 16, a forestry apprentice with Tilhill Forestry Nurseries. After a time spent working in Hamburg, Germany, learning about tree management within urban and park environments he moved to Kew to study the world-famous Diploma in Horticulture to broaden his knowledge in horticulture.

The only student to be offered a job at Kew upon graduation, he spent the next 14 years managing part of Kew's arboretum. During this time, he completed several plant collecting expeditions in East Asia, including South Korea, Taiwan, the Russian Far East and Sakhalin Island, China and Japan to add to Kew's collection and replace trees lost in the Great Storm of 1987.

After 43 years, Kirkham retired from the post of Kew's Head of Arboretum, Gardens and Horticultural Services where he and his team managed 14,000 trees and shared their passion for trees with the visitors to Kew. He is the author of several books and ran the "Treeathlon" to support the Trees for Cities campaign for more trees in urban areas in the UK, and says that “looking at trees anywhere in the world” is one of his hobbies.

Kirkham sits on many professional committees and is a trustee of the International Dendrology Society, chairing the "Trees and Shrubs Online" Project.

He is a member of council of the Royal Horticultural Society and vice chair of the Woody Expert Group and is a member of the RHS Awards Committee..

He is a trustee of the Tree Register of Britain and Ireland (TROBI), and a trustee of the Chelsea Physic Garden, where he also chairs its Garden Advisory Committee.

Kirkham is the patron of Tree, Design Action Group (TDAG).

He has featured in several television documentaries about trees including:

2006 BBC 2: The Trees That Made Britain, 8 x half hour series. (Main Presenter) 2008 BBC 2: The Trees That made Britain 2, 6 half hour series (Main Presenter)

2017 Atlantic TV: My passion for Trees, with Judi Dench 1 x hour

2019 ITV: Judi Dench’s Wild Borneo Adventure 2 x 1 hour

2024 BBC Radio 4 Series 30: The Infinite Monkey’s Cage The Wonder of Trees with Judi Dench and Tristan Gooley

2025 Channel 5: The Secret Life of Trees. 3 x 1 hour series (also, Series Consultant)

== Awards ==
In 2009, Kirkham was awarded the Associate of Honour by the Royal Horticultural Society (RHS) for his services to horticulture. He is one of only 100 people in the UK and Ireland to hold this award.

In 2016, Kirkham was named one of the most influential Londoners in the Evening Standard's Progress 1000 list: London's most influential people.

In 2015, he was awarded Honorary Lifetime Fellowship of the Arboricultural Association, recognising the significant and positive impact he has made to Arboriculture.

He also received the William Aiton medal in December 2016 for exceptional services to Royal Botanic Gardens, Kew.

In 2019, he was awarded the Victoria Medal of Honour (VMH). The award was established in 1897 "in perpetual remembrance of Her Majesty's glorious reign, and to enable the RHS Council to confer honour on British horticulturists." Only sixty-three horticulturists can hold the VMH at any given time, in commemoration of the sixty-three years of Queen Victoria's reign.

He was also appointed MBE in the Queen's New Years Honours list in 2019 for services to the Royal Botanic Gardens, Kew and to Arboriculture.

In 2019, he was awarded the Arboricultural Association Lifetime Achievement Award, recognising the significant and positive contribution to the arboricultural industry or profession.

In 2022, the Institute of Chartered Foresters (ICF) awarded him with an honorary fellowship in recognition of his service to the advancement of arboricultural knowledge FICFor(Hon).

In 2023, The Worshipful Company of Gardeners awarded him the Prince Edward Award for Excellence in Horticultural Career Development, intended to highlight real excellence in the field of horticulture.

In May 2023, The Massachusetts Horticultural Society (USA) awarded Kirkham the Thomas Roland Medal for exceptional development and dissemination of horticultural knowledge at their 120th Honorary Medals ceremony.

== Publications ==
=== Books as author or co-author ===
- The Pruning of Trees, Shrubs and Conifers
- Essential Pruning Techniques
- Plants from the Edge of the World: New Explorations in the Far East
- Wilson's China: A Century On
- The Haynes Workshop Manual on Trees
- Remarkable Trees
- Growing Trees in the Kew Gardens series
- Arboretum
- Trees
- The Tree Care Manual

== Interviews ==
(The New York Times) The Indiana Jones of Plants

(BBC News) The oldest living thing on Earth

(The Telegraph) Climate change: why we need to change our taste in trees
