= Mary Grierson =

British botanical artist and scientific illustrator (1912–2012)

- Born: Mary Anderson Grierson; 27 September 1912; Bangor, Caernarvonshire, Wales
- Died: 30 January 2012 (aged 99); Kingston upon Thames, London, England
- Occupations: Botanical artist; Illustrator
- Employer: Royal Botanic Gardens
- Awards: Victoria Medal of Honour

Mary Anderson Grierson (27 September 1912 – 30 January 2012) was a Welsh-born Scottish botanical artist and illustrator. The youngest of three children to parents hailing from Dumfries, she was encouraged by her mother to paint from an early age but preferred watercolour over oil. Grierson served in the Women's Auxiliary Air Force as a flight officer in a photographic reconnaissance unit and used the skills she learnt into use later in her life. She joined De Havilland's public relations department after demobilisation and moved to Hunting Aerosurveys in 1947. Grierson was sent on a week course in pen and ink drawing in Suffolk ten years later and returned there for another ten years after finding the experience fulfilling.

In 1960, she became employed by the Royal Botanic Gardens in Kew as the Herbarium's resident artist. Grierson later illustrated several books and had her work exhibited at various locations across the globe. She officially retired from Kew Gardens in 1972 to enable her to take up more private commissions. Grierson was the recipient of several medals, including the Victoria Medal of Honour by the Royal Horticultural Society in 1997.

== Biography ==
=== Early life ===
Grierson was born on 27 September 1912 at Bodfaen, Craig Y Don Road, Bangor in Caernarvonshire. She was the youngest of three children of the laundry proprietor George Rae Grierson and his wife Anna, née Shortridge. Both of Grierson's parents came from Dumfries. Anna was an oil painter and encouraged Grierson to take up the same career from an early age. Grierson preferred watercolour over oil as she disliked the smell that comes from oils. She was educated at the Bangor County School for Girls and later claimed at the school she did not enjoy all subjects apart from art and botany of which she excelled. Grierson chose not to attend university, but was awarded the diploma of the Royal Drawing Society in London in 1930, which confirmed her talent for the first time.

She spent 1931 teaching English to a German family but returned home to study at Battersea Polytechnic and found employment as a confectioner in Llandudno. Her parents became ill and this induced Grierson to return home and care for them. Following the death of her father, she and her mother relocated to Dumfries where she managed a local restaurant. When World War II broke out, Grierson served in the Women's Auxiliary Air Force as a flight officer in a photographic reconnaissance unit, and was based at Medmenham in Buckinghamshire. Her work saw her examine aerial photographs taken after British air raids in Germany to assess what damage had been done. Grierson's job required good vision and heavy concentration which she put to use later in life.

=== Career ===
After demobilisation, Grierson joined De Havilland's public relations department and was put in charge of photographs. In 1947, she moved to Hunting Aerosurveys, a company that produced maps from aerial photographs. Hunting Aerosurveys sent Grierson on a week's course in pen and ink drawing at the Flatford Mill Field Centre in Suffolk ten years later. She found the experience so fulfilling and returned to come under the mentorship of the painter John Nash for the next ten years. Grierson applied for the vacancy of exhibitions officer at the Royal Botanic Gardens in Kew in 1960. She showed a portfolio of her work to her interviewer, Edgar Milne-Redhead, the deputy keeper of the Kew Herbarium. Milne-Redhead took one of her paintings and suggested to Grierson that she would be better off working as the Herbarium's resident artist.

In 1966, she won her first gold medal for flower painting from the Royal Horticultural Society (RHS), and was invited to contribute designs for two postage stamps for the Post Office the next year: a primrose for the 9d and a violet for the 1s.9d. The first book Grierson illustrated came in 1967 which was Anthony Julian Huxley's Mountain Flowers. A further gold medal was awarded to her in 1969. The Israeli Nature Authority commissioned her to paint the flora of the Negev and Sinai deserts in 1970. Grierson retired from Kew in 1972 and this enabled her to accept more private commissions. These works included a series of paintings of endangered plants for the archives of the World Wide Fund for Nature and a major series of tulip drawings for the Van Tubergen Nurseries at Haarlem that were later purchased by Kew Gardens. In 1973, she was invited to go to Hawaii to create a record of plants at the National Tropical Botanical Garden.

Grierson's paintings began to be exhibited in the same year at the International Exhibition of Botanical Art in Johannesburg and Cape Town. In 1975, her paintings were put on display at the Hunt Institute for Botanical Documentation in Pittsburgh, and she illustrated her second book that same year, Trees and Shrubs of the British Isles by William Bean. Grierson had her first of seven solo exhibitions at Spink & Son in 1978. Starting from 1966, she had been teaching a course at Kew but ended this in 1983. Grierson received the RHS's Gold Veitch Memorial Medal the following year. Her work was further exhibited at the Pacific Tropical Botanical Garden in 1984 and received an honorary Master of Philosophy degree from the University of Reading two years later. Grierson illustrated Brian Mathew's Hellebores in 1989 and earned a silver medal at the 1990 International Book Art Exhibition in Leipzig.

Her sole exhibition at Kew Gardens came in 1993 and her last exhibition at Spink & Son followed in the next year. Grierson's work in Hawaii appeared in Peter Shaw Green's A Hawaiian florilegium: botanical portraits from paradise in 1996 and was awarded the Victoria Medal of Honour by the RHS in 1997.

=== Later years and death ===
She lived in Lynde House Care Home in Twickenham in her later years and suffered from impaired vision that was caused by macular degeneration. Grierson suffered a stroke on 26 December 2011, and died at Kingston Hospital from this on 30 January 2012. Her ashes were scattered on the mound of the Royal Botanic Gardens in Kew. Grierson never married.
