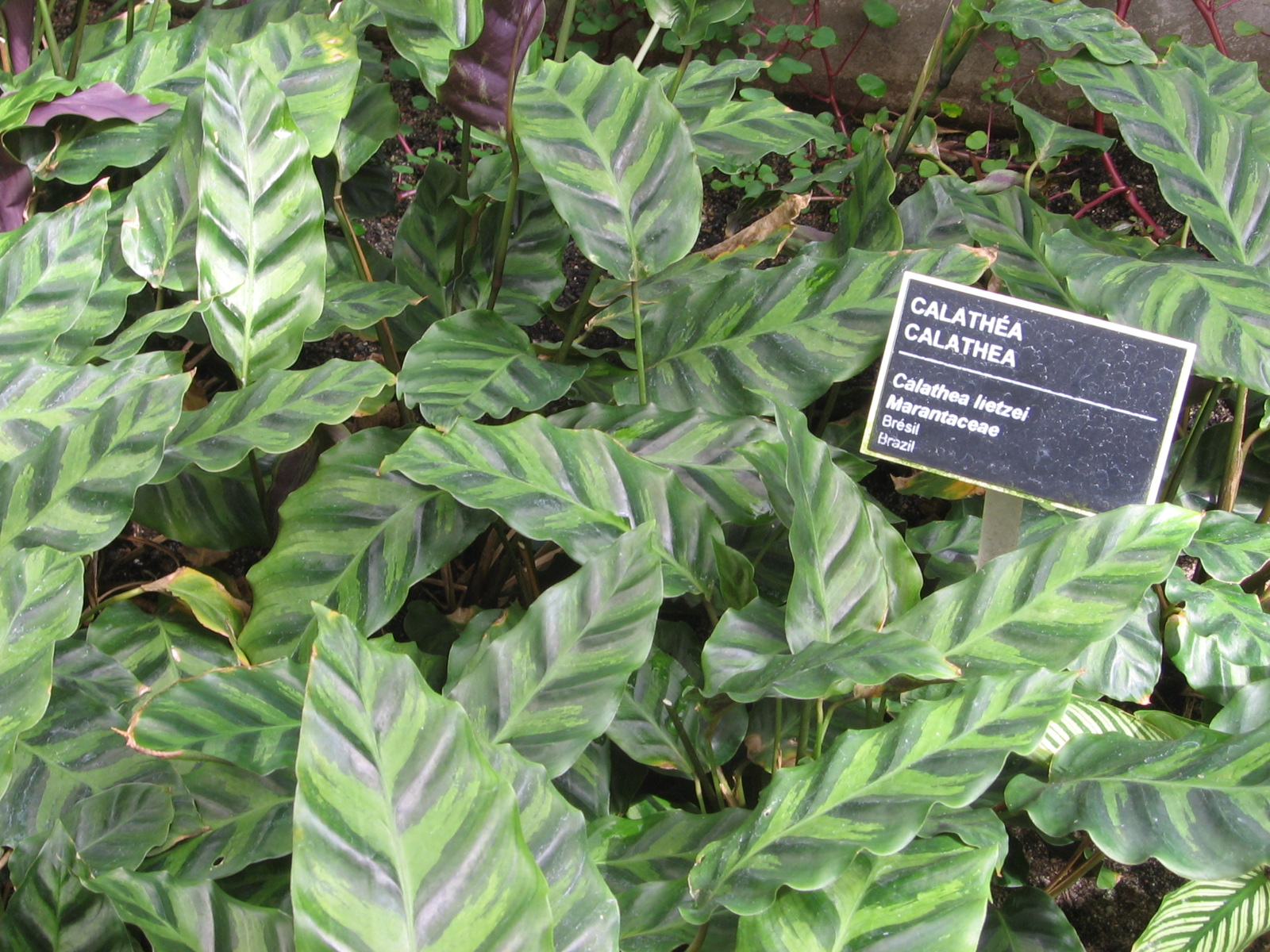

Scientific classification
- Kingdom: Plantae
- Clade: Embryophytes
- Clade: Tracheophytes
- Clade: Spermatophytes
- Clade: Angiosperms
- Clade: Monocots
- Clade: Commelinids
- Order: Zingiberales
- Family: Marantaceae
- Genus: Goeppertia
- Species: G. lietzei

Binomial name
- Goeppertia lietzei (É.Morren) Saka

Synonyms
- Calathea louisae (É.Morren); Maranta lietzei C.H.Nelson, Sutherl. & Fern.Casas

= Goeppertia lietzei =

Species of plant

Goeppertia lietzei (syn. Calathea lietzei) is a species of plant belonging to the genus Goeppertia of the Marantaceae family, native to eastern Brazil.

Goeppertia lietzei has been introduced to El Salvador, Honduras, and Mexico. It can be considered invasive in West Java, Indonesia. It has also been reported as growing in disturbed forest in East Kalimantan, Indonesia. In Indonesia, it is locally known as Kalatea batik.

== Description ==
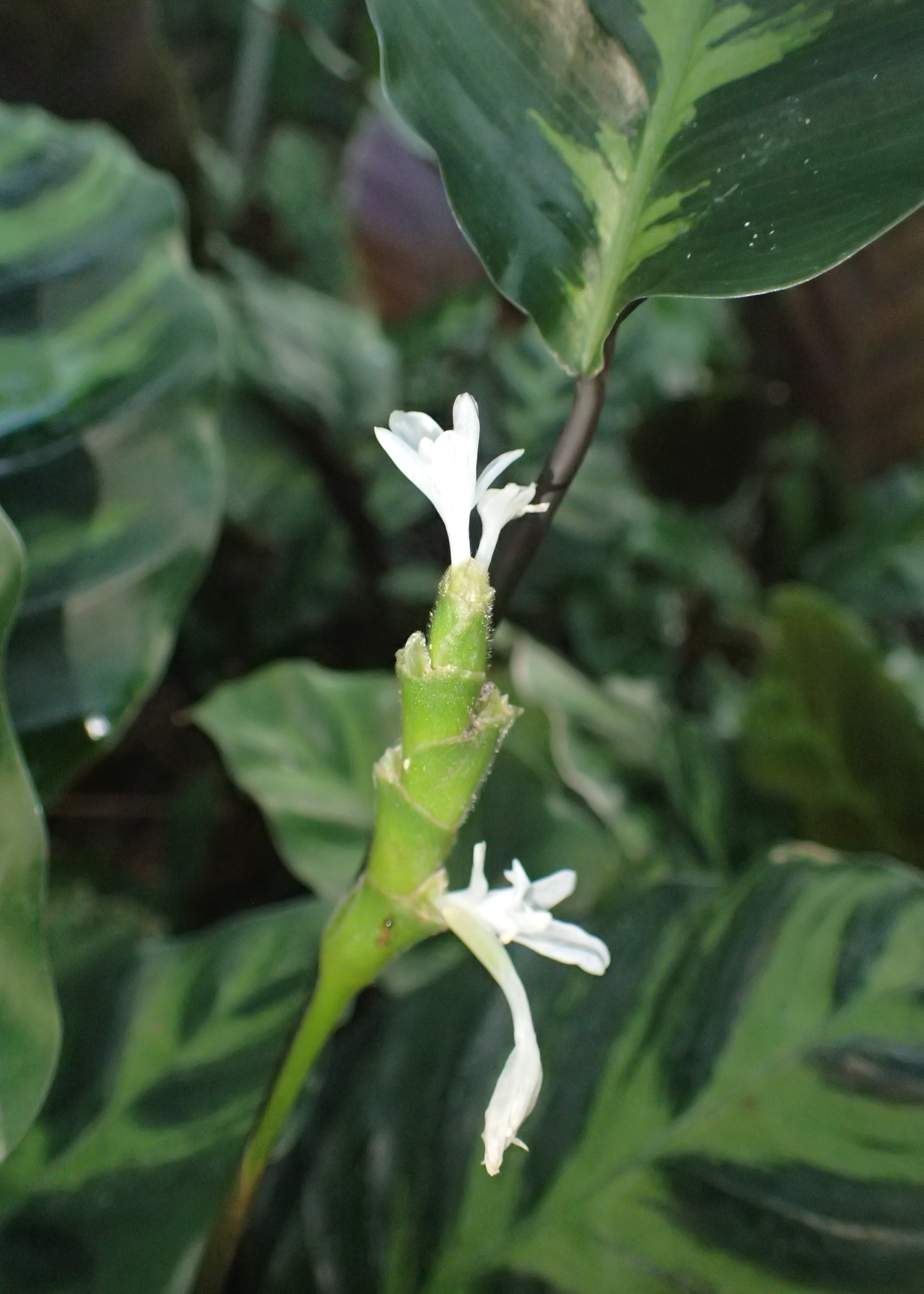
Inflorescence of Goeppertia lietzei

Goeppertia lietzei is a medium sized species with pointy, long, dark green leaves, with a long, think, green or purple petioles and a green or purple, short pulvinus. It has a pattern on the surface of the leaves with straight, light green bands appearing from the middle vein to the sides of the leaf. The inflorescence of Goeppertia lietzei is made of multiple bracts on a long, thin peduncle. The bracts are green, sometimes a bit hairy and the flowers are fully white.

== Cultivation ==
While many of cultivars like "White Fusion" and else are sold as Goeppertia lietzei on the market, those are actually all cultivars of Goeppertia albertii. This confusion came from the original google patent of the White Fusion cultivar which stated that it came from a selection of Calathea lietzei, but they were stating this without any inflroescence confirmation. Later flowering specimens made it clear that the google patent was wrong. Goeppertia lietzei does have a variegated cultivar, but it is not wildely sold on the market and is very rare to find in cultivation.
