= Peter Edmund Kay =

British horticulturalist (1853–1909)

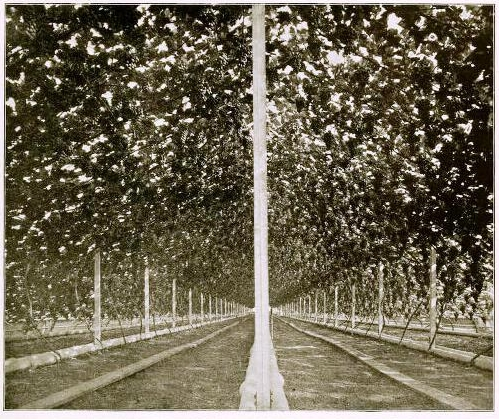
Greenhouse with 10,000 bunches of Black Alicante grapes, c.1894. According to Kay, the photograph was taken at the request of the gardener to the Prince of Wales, the future King Edward VII, "who desired the Prince to see what he considered the finest house of grapes ever grown. Mr Craig said 'I consider this as great an achievement in horticulture as Westminster Abbey is in architecture'".

Peter Edmund Kay (6 May 1853 - 22 August 1909) was the founder, owner and manager of the Claigmar Vineyard in Finchley in north London. The vineyard produced table grapes, tomatoes and cucumbers on a large scale in the late nineteenth and early twentieth centuries. In 1897 he was one of the sixty inaugural recipients of the Victoria Medal of Honour (VMH), awarded by the Royal Horticultural Society to horticulturists specially deserving of honour.

== Background ==
Kay was the younger of two children of Peter Kay and Mary Ann Aedy, a farmer's daughter who died giving birth to him on 6 May 1853. Peter Kay was a horticulturist who moved from Fife in Scotland to Finchley, which was then a village on the northern outskirts of London. In the 1830s or early 1840s he set up a nursery, probably on the site which he owned by the mid-1850s, and which is now occupied by a Tesco supermarket in Ballards Lane. He was one of the pioneers of commercial grape growing in the northern home counties, and his Black Hamburg vine achieved a wide fame. It was still being praised in horticultural magazines and books forty years after his death in 1862. After Peter's death the nursery was taken over by his brother John, but he died in 1864, and his widow Susannah then ran it until her death in 1889.

== Training ==
After his father's death, Peter Edmund trained in a ducal vinery, almost certainly that of the Duke of Buccleuch in Dalkeith in Scotland. He was then apprenticed to James Sweet, who had been an apprentice of Peter Kay.

== Claigmar Vineyard ==
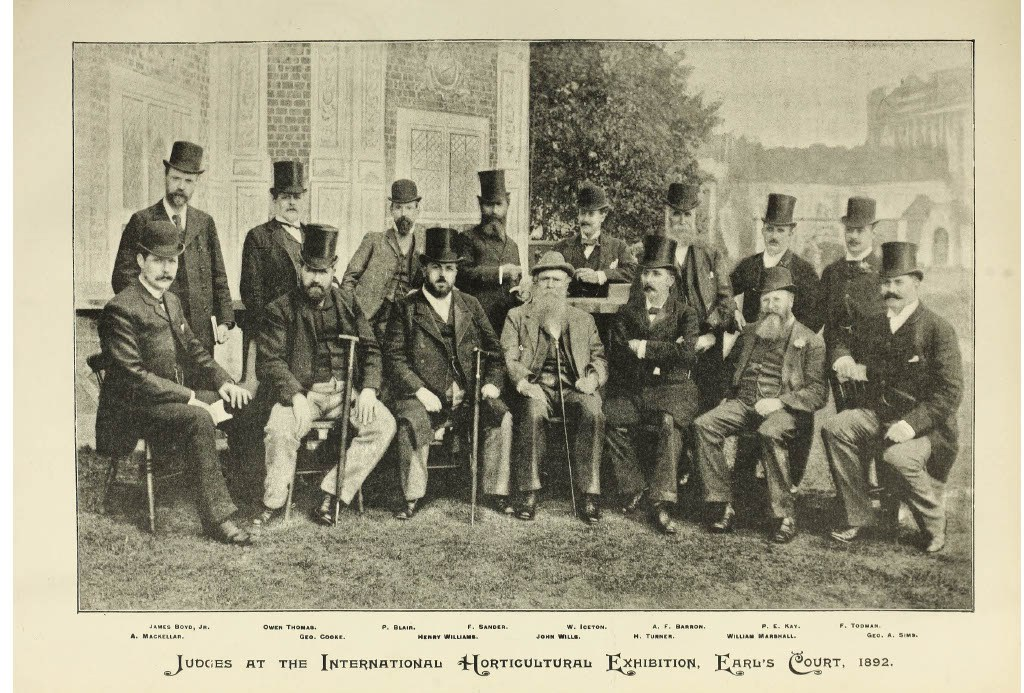
Judges at the International Horticultural Exhibition, Earls Court, 1892. Kay is second from the right in the back row

Kay started up in business on his own account in Finchley in 1872, and his business was so successful that in 1882 he was able to have his own detached house built. His name for the nursery, Claigmar Vineyard, is first recorded in 1887. In the same year, Archibald Barron, in the standard work of the period on grape growing, Vines and Vine Culture, listed Kay second in a list of the largest growers in Britain. He incorporated the business as P. E. Kay Limited in 1889. In 1903 he incorporated a second company, Mill Hill Vineyard Limited.

The Claigmar Vineyard produced grapes, tomatoes and cucumbers, and its output expanded rapidly. The area covered by greenhouses increased from 1.8 acres in 1889 to 18 acres in 1904. In the early 1900s, Kay was one of the largest grape producers in the London area, with an output of around 100 tons a year, together with 100 tons of tomatoes and 20,000 dozens of cucumbers. He had 161 greenhouses, with a total length of five and a half miles. Obtaining sufficient water was expensive, and Kay constructed piping to collect rainwater falling on the greenhouses and a reservoir holding five million gallons. He thus saved £600 a year in water rates. The reservoir still exists and is now Lakeside Nature Reserve.

By the late 1880s, Kay had become a member of the horticultural establishment, and he won prizes for his grapes at horticultural shows in Britain, France and Germany. He gave papers to the Royal Horticultural Society and the Horticural Club, and in 1897 he was one of sixty inaugural recipients of the Royal Horticultural Society's highest award, the Victoria Medal of Honour (VMH), for "British horticulturists deserving of special honour by the Society".

In an account of fruit-growing under glass in 1899, the horticultural writer William Bear wrote:

The most important of the Metropolitan districts in relation to hot-house fruit production are those situated north of London, and the notes of visits to some of the largest glass-house nurseries could not begin more appropriately than with those relating to the great undertaking founded and carried on by Mr Peter Kay at Finchley. Mr Kay has long been noted as one of the best grape growers in the country, his success with the Canon Hall variety, a difficult one to grow to perfection, being unequalled.

Kay's business declined in profitability in his last years, and this continued after his death in 1909, but the company always remained solvent and paid its debts. It gradually sold off its land for house building in the 1920s, and it is last listed in directories in 1929.

== Later years and death ==
Kay suffered from financial and health problems in the years before he died. According to his obituary in the Hendon & Finchley Times: "A few years ago, through a technicality, Mr Kay's affairs became somewhat involved, and this has been a source of great worry to him." He had a weak heart and died on heart failure on 22 August 1909.

== Personal life and family ==
Kay kept up his connection with Scotland all his life and he had bankers and solicitors in Edinburgh as well as London. On 7 September 1887 he married Jane (or Jeanie) Glassford, who was born in Greenock in 1854. They had four children, Peter Crichton Kay (1889–1954), Joan Margaret Kay (born 1890), Walter Glassford Kay (1892–1988) and Elizabeth Dorothy Kay (born 1895). Lieutenant-Colonel Peter Crichton Kay commanded the 7th battalion of the Middlesex Regiment during the First World War and was awarded the DSO and MC. He became an expert on the production of flowers for the market and was president of the British Flower Industry Association. He was awarded his own VMH in 1951.

== Sources ==
- Barron, Archibald (1887). Vines and Vine Culture (2nd ed.). London, UK: Journal of Horticulture.
- Barron, Archibald (1900). Vines and Vine Culture (4th ed.). London, UK: Journal of Horticulture.
- Bear, Williams (1899). "Flower and Fruit Farming in England. IV. Fruit Growing under Glass". Journal of the Royal Agricultural Society of England. 3rd. 10: 267–313.
- Castle, R. Lewis (1906). The Book of Market Gardening. London, UK: John Lane.
- "Death of Mr Peter Kay". Hendon & Finchley Times. 27 August 1909. p. 6.
- Desmond, Ray (1994). Dictionary of British and Irish Botanists and Horticulturists Including Plant Collectors, Flower Painters and Garden Designers. CRC Press.
- Hewlett, Janet; et al. (1997). Nature Conservation in Barnet. London, UK: London Ecology Unit.
- "The Judges at the International Horticultural Exhibition, Earls Court, 1892". Gardening World: 213. 3 December 1892.
- K. (28 December 1895). "Through American Eyes: Peter E. Kay's, London". The American Florist. 11. American Florist Company: 554–556.
- Kay, Peter (30 May 1896). "Grape Culture in its Commercial Aspect', Paper read to the Horticultural Club on 5 May". The Garden. 49: 397–400.
- Kay, Peter (1900–1901). "Saving and Using the Rain". Journal of the Royal Horticultural Society of London. new series. 25: 146–54.
- "Lieut.-Col. P. C. Kay [obituary]". The Times. 15 October 1954. p. 11.
- Miles, Dudley (February 2024). "Claigmar Vineyard in Finchley: Commercial Grape Growing in the Ninetheenth and early Twentieth Centuries". The Local Historian. 54 (1): 26–40.. (An extended version of this article was published in instalments in the Newsletter of Hendon and District Archaeological Society, June, July and August 2024 issues.)
- "Mill Hill Vineyard, Ltd". Financial Times. 21 December 1903. p. 4.
- "P. E. Kay Limited share offer". Financial Times. 29 January 1904. p. 8.
- "RHS people awards". Royal Horticultural Society. 2024.
- S.C. (10 January 1903). "A Large Vine at Finchley". The Gardeners' Chronicle: 29.
- "Victoria Medal of Honour in Horticulture, 1897". Journal of the Royal Horticultural Society of London. new series. 21: 1–4. 1897–1898.
- W. H. A. (22 July 1903). "Notable Nurseries: The Claigmar Vineyards at Finchley Five Miles of Glass. Grape Growing by the Ton. A Chat with Mr P. E. Kay V.M.H.". The Market Growers' Gazette: 370–72.
