= National Association of Flower Arrangement Societies =

UK organization

The National Association of Flower Arrangement Societies (NAFAS) is a society of flower arranging clubs and societies in the United Kingdom.

They banded together as the National Association of Flower Arrangement Societies in 1959. In 1984 NAFAS was granted charitable status in recognition of its education activities. It currently has around 70,000 members.

== History ==
Although the National Association of Flower Arrangement Societies was formed in 1959 it had its origins in the years after the Second World War when various ladies travelled to America and saw how the garden club movement welcomed flower arranging as something to be linked with plant growing. Julia Clements visited America and returned becoming active in lectures and demonstrations on flower arranging to Women's Institutes and other clubs. She published her first book Fun with Flowers in 1950. In Dorset Mary Pope, having returned from Canada where she spent some of the war years, set up a panel in 1948 to fill the need for more knowledgeable judges of flower arranging for the increasing number of classes in horticultural shows. She went on to form a club in Dorchester in 1949 to encourage entries in the flower arranging sections of the horticultural societies and it soon had five hundred members.

The Flower Academy was an event staged at the Royal Horticultural Society's New Hall in London when the four existing flower arranging clubs in the country joined to stage a floral arrangements exhibition. The Colchester Flower Club, the Dorset Floral Decoration Club, the Leicester and County Flower Lovers Guild and the London Floral Decoration Society arranged 350 floral exhibits which attracted huge crowds and became 'news'. Visitors returned home and clubs were formed throughout the country.

Guidance from the Royal Horticultural Society was sought in 1954 when Mary Pope approached them for advice and help as there was a need to co-ordinate the many flower clubs being formed. On 7 December 1954 the President of the RHS, David Bowes-Lyon convened a meeting attended by representatives from 45 clubs from England, Scotland and Wales. This led to the formation within the RHS of the Floral Decoration Society in 1955, delegates from 125 clubs attended the meeting and agreed to divide Great Britain into five large regions.

At the Chelsea Flower Show in 1956, the RHS provided a large marquee for the five regional organisations to show their artistry, this was visited by both Queen Elizabeth and the Queen Mother. Huge queues to view the floral designs and this in turn led to an upsurge in membership of flower clubs. As well as exhibiting at Chelsea each of the now seven Areas (North East Area was formed in 1957 and North West Area soon after) held shows in their own regions to great acclaim.

Over the next few years, the RHS Floral Decoration Committee produced lists of judges, teachers and demonstrators of flower arranging to help clubs organise their programmes and shows and by 1958 it was realised that a separate organisation should be formed.

On 26 January 1959, the serving members of the RHS Flower Arrangement Committee agreed to form a Caretaker Committee under the proposed name, the National Association of Flower Arrangement Societies of Great Britain (NAFAS). They had three immediate tasks: to draft a constitution, to accumulate funds and to set up a central administration. The constitution was drafted by Mary and Bill Gough, with advice from the RHS. For funding, the RHS provided a venue, free of charge, for The Festival of Floral Decoration held on 14 and 15 July 1959. There was both a competitive section and non-competitive section that resulted in a profit of £800 and much publicity gained.

By the end of 1959 a new area was formed, Three Counties & South Wales, from clubs originally in the South West Area and the Midlands. The Association was by now employing a part-time national secretary who shared a small room at Denison House, Vauxhall Bridge Road with the Metropolitan Gardeners Association.

1960 saw the first General Meeting of NAFAS, as it had become known, and a National Council was set up and a constitution adopted. From then on it was case of organisation and development as lists of judges, teachers, demonstrators and lecturers were set up and the idea of a national journal was explored. The Flower Arranger magazine was published in March 1961 as an A5 publication and is still going strong fifty years later.

Over the next five decades, NAFAS developed and became known throughout the world as a flower arranging organisation, of men and women, and membership peaked at 100,000.

== Activities ==
Activities for members are organised at level, area and national level. At local level each flower club arranges an annual programme which includes flower arranging demonstrations by trained and qualified NAFAS demonstrators, there may also be hands-on workshops, talks and garden visits as well as other social activities. A similar programme is often arranged by the Area Associations but on a larger scale. Nationally the highlight of the year is the National Show at which members compete and display their artistic talents in a variety of classes at a different venue each year. There are also demonstrations, talks and workshops all designed to encourage the public to develop an interest in floral art. Recent shows have been at Edinburgh 2008, Coventry 2009, and Harrogate 2010 and are planned for Torquay 2011 and Southport 2012. These are usually three-day events open to members and the general public.

Other events for members which take place in various venues around the UK are the Annual General Meeting and the Annual Assembly. The latter is an opportunity to meet up with members and enjoy flower arranging demonstrations, talks, workshops and visits.

A number of NAFAS courses teaching floral art and design are available throughout the United Kingdom. The Association also trains demonstrators, judges and speakers. The Flower Arranger magazine is published quarterly.

The Association arranges flowers at Westminster Abbey for major festivals and events including Commonwealth Observance in March and the Order of the Bath every four years. Flowers were provided at Westminster Abbey on 17 September 2010 during Pope Benedict XVI's visit to the United Kingdom, when flowers in the papal colours of white and yellow were arranged.

Close links have been maintained since the earliest years of its existence with the Royal Horticultural Society, to which NAFAS is affiliated. NAFAS has been invited to exhibit at Chelsea since 1975 and each year a different NAFAS Area constructs a huge floral exhibit in the floral marquee hoping to be the recipient of a RHS award. Floral exhibits are also staged at many of the RHS London Flower Shows. With the 50th anniversary of NAFAS in 2009 the opportunity was taken to launch a new rose 'Golden Fanfare' at Chelsea by the television presenters Christopher Biggins and Rachel De Thame. The rose is shown on the poster for a flower festival staged at Westminster Abbey to celebrate the golden anniversary of NAFAS.

== Organisation ==
Members of flower clubs are affiliated to their Area Association and form the affiliated membership of the charity. There are 21 Area Associations providing geographical representation throughout the United Kingdom to which the local clubs are affiliated. It is also possible to be an individual affiliated member for anyone who is not able to join a flower club, and to enjoy the benefits of being a member of NAFAS. Members are also affiliated to WAFA – the World Association of Flower Arrangers.

Each of the 21 affiliated Areas hold Council Meetings at which each flower club has representation. The Areas in turn are represented at National Council which meets four times a year. A Board of nine Trustees is elected at National Council to oversee the policy and finances of the charity. A national chairman, 1st vice-chairman and 2nd vice-chairman head the organisation for a period of two years in each office. A company secretary is employed as are three other full-time staff. The Headquarters of the Association is a splendid Georgian merchant's house at 12 Devonshire Square in the city of London bought in 2001. Previously the Headquarters were at 21 Denbigh Street in Pimlico. The present building usually opens every two years as part of the London Open House Weekend when the public may visit and see some of the organisation's activities.
