= Fred Streeter =

British horticulturalist and broadcaster (1879–1975)

Frederick Streeter (25 June 1877 – 1 November 1975) was a British horticulturalist and broadcaster.

Streeter was born in Pulborough, Sussex, England, on 25 June 1879, to farm worker James Streeter and Dinah (née Sayers). The family moved to Dorking in Surrey, where he was educated at North Holmwood; and later to Reigate, after which he attended Reigate Grammar School. He left school at twelve years of age. He often had to move around for his gardening work in order to gain experience and promotion. He worked for Veitchs the famous nurserymen in Kings Road, Chelsea, then moved to Straffan, a large estate in Ireland, and from there, in 1901, to Basing Park near Alton as foreman, where he met his wife Hilda, née Burden (2 February 1880 – 26 February 1966). He secured his first job as a head gardener in his twenties.

Streeter was awarded the MBE in the 1973 Birthday Honours.

== Presenting ==
He presented the BBC radio programme Home Grown, with Roy Hay, that occupied the two o'clock slot on Sunday afternoon that was later occupied by Gardener's Question Time. He also worked on television.

In 1945, he was awarded the Royal Horticultural Society's Victoria Medal of Honour, its highest award. He appeared as a castaway on the BBC Radio programme Desert Island Discs on 15 July 1957.

He died on 1 November 1975 at Petworth House Gardens in Petworth, Sussex, his home. His final broadcast, which was prerecorded, was transmitted on the same day.
