= Charles Percival Raffill =

Botanist (1876–1951)

Charles Percival Raffill (1876–1951), called "C.P.R." or "Charlie", was a British botanist, with an interest in spermatophytes. He was Assistant Curator of the Royal Botanic Gardens, Kew, and worked there for nearly 53 years.

== Honors ==
The Royal Horticultural Society awarded Raffill the Victoria Medal of Honour and the Associateship of Honour. He also received the Member of the Order of the British Empire (MBE) award.

== Legacy ==
Some taxa are named after Rafill, such as Dracaena raffillii (formerly Sansevieria raffillii) and the cultivars Magnolia campbellii 'Charles Rafill' and Hedychium coccineum 'CP Raffill'. The C. P. Raffill Prize is awarded for best student paper given at the Mutual Improvement Society by the Kew Guild.
