= Roy Hay (horticulturist) =

British horticultural journalist and broadcaster

Roy Hay MBE, VMH (20 August 1910 – 21 October 1989) was a British horticultural journalist and broadcaster. He was the author of many publications and the instigator of many organisations and events, including the annual Britain in Bloom competition.

== Early life ==
Roy Hay, the son of gardener Thomas Hay, was born in 1910 on the estate of Lord Linlithgow, where his father managed the gardens. In 1911, the family moved to Greenwich Park, one of the Royal Parks of London, where Thomas had secured a post. The family later moved to Regent's Park and Hyde Park as Thomas advanced in his career, eventually becoming superintendent of the Royal Parks. In 1924 Roy Hay was taken to the Chelsea Flower Show for the first time, his father having arranged for him to miss school "to start his proper education". He attended every show from that point until his death. Roy passed up the opportunity to attend university and instead joined Watkins and Simpson, a wholesale seed company, working on the breeding side and taking pictures for the catalogue. He began to write short pieces to go with these photographs, and with this, his journalism career began.

== Journalist and broadcaster ==
Having written short pieces for the Watkins and Simpson seed catalogue, Roy began to contribute frequently on horticultural matters. In 1936 he became assistant editor for the Gardeners' Chronicle (which became Horticulture Week) a weekly publication started by Joseph Paxton in 1841. The Chronicle moved to Reading after the outbreak of the Second World War and Roy began to edit for various publications of the Royal Horticultural Society. In 1940 he was recruited by the Ministry of Agriculture and spent two years on their "Dig for Victory" campaign. This campaign was designed to persuade people to cultivate their own gardens and plots to combat food shortages. In 1942 he was appointed the horticultural officer to Malta when the Siege of Malta began. In 1945 Roy went on to become controller of horticulture and seeds division for the British zone in occupied Germany.

He returned to the Gardeners' Chronicle and in 1956, Hay succeeded the formidable editor Charles H Curtis as its editor, a position he would hold until 1964. In this role he was assisted by Robert Pearson and was known to be a stickler for accuracy.

Roy Hay also presented the BBC radio programme Home Grown, with Fred Streeter, that occupied the two o'clock slot on Sunday afternoon and was later to be occupied by Gardener's Question Time. On this show he came into regular contact with the contributor to the programme, Frances Perry whom he married in 1977. They were long standing colleagues and together visited many countries.

== Flower shows and Britain in Bloom ==
David Bowes-Lyon set up the British Committee for Overseas Flower Shows and made Roy its secretary, during his time as editor of the Gardeners' Chronicle. Roy was instrumental in raising the funds in 1955 to set up the British woodland garden at the second Ghent Floralies which won the Grand Prix d'Honneur. Success followed at Paris and in the third Ghent Floralies. The Board of Trade were impressed with this record and offered £10,000 for promotions at the Valenciennes Festival but they were required to give this money to a trade organisation. Roy approached the National Farmers Union and the Horticultural Traders Association, neither of whom were interested. This led to David Bowes-Lyon instructing Roy to set up a brand new organisation. Thus was born the Federation of British Horticultural Exporters which then had seven members, and now has 110 member firms and is now known as Gardenex. Valenciennes was a success.

Whilst on holiday in France in the early 1960s, Roy Hay noticed that the place was "over flowing with plants and flowers". Further investigation revealed that the `Fleurissement de France` was in full swing. This was essentially a "make-France-more-beautiful campaign", initiated by the French Tourist Authority in 1959 on the instructions of General Charles de Gaulle to brighten the country up. On returning to Britain, Hay resolved to emulate this event. He approached the British Tourist Authority (BTA) and along with the director general of the BTA, Len Lickorish, set up a committee to run the British version with the title "Britain in Bloom". Many organisations were recruited to help, from the AA and RAC to the Royal Horticultural Society (RHS) and quite soon the event became a phenomenon which has since eclipsed all similar events in Europe in terms of its scale. Despite its later success, Roy Hay did reflect that the initial help from horticultural trade and local authorities in general was lukewarm.

== Other influence ==
The Gardeners' Sunday Organisation (later to be merged with National Gardens Scheme) was formed in 1956 at the suggestion of Roy Hay.

== Honours and awards ==
He received a number of honours for his work including the MBE in 1970 and the RHS's Victoria Medal of Honour in 1970, the RHS's highest honour. He was also honoured with the title Officier du Merite Agricole by both Belgium (in 1956) and France (in 1959) for his work in Europe in the years following the war.

== Memorial award ==
There is a memorial award named after Roy Hay which has been described as much coveted.

== Personal life ==
Roy Hay married Frances Perry in 1977, a fellow winner of the Victoria Medal of Honour, who survived him after his death in 1989. They were long standing colleagues and together visited many countries.

== Selected bibliography ==
Cover of Colour Dictionary of Garden Plants

- Color Dictionary of Flowers and Plants for Home and Garden
- The Colour Dictionary of Garden Plants with Patrick M. Synge VMH
- Dictionary of Indoor Plants in Colour
- Field Guide to Tropical and Subtropical Plants (with Frances Perry)
- The last edition of The English Flower Garden (originally by William Robinson 1838–1935) was edited and revised by Roy Hay.
- Flower Garden Guide (Publisher: Purnell)
