= 1993 Birthday Honours =

Queen's awards for the Commonwealth

The 1993 Queen's Birthday honours were appointments by some of the 16 Commonwealth realms to various orders and honours to recognise and reward good works by citizens of those countries. The Birthday Honours are awarded as part of the Queen's birthday celebrations and were announced on 11 June 1993 for the United Kingdom, the Bahamas, Solomon Islands, Saint Lucia, Grenada, Papua New Guinea, and New Zealand and the Cook Islands. The list for Australia was announced separately on 14 June.

Recipients of awards are shown below as they were styled before their new honours.

== United Kingdom ==
=== Life peer (Baron) ===
- Sir Richard Attenborough, C.B.E., Actor, Producer and Director.
- Sir Ralf Dahrendorf, K.B.E., Warden of St Antony's College, Oxford.
- The Right Honourable Robert (Robin) Leigh-Pemberton, Governor, Bank of England and Lord Lieutenant of Kent.
- Sir Yehudi Menuhin, O.M., K.B.E., Violinist, Conductor.

=== Privy Counsellor (PC) ===
- Roger Norman Freeman, M.P., Member of Parliament for Kettering. For political service.
- Sir George Samuel Knatchbull Young, Bt., M.P., Member of Parliament for Ealing Acton. For political service.

=== Knight Bachelor ===
- Professor Colin Leonard Berry, Professor of Morbid Anatomy, The Royal London Hospital. Chairman, Advisory Committee on Pesticides.
- Robin Adair Biggam, Chairman, BICC plc. For services to the Cable and Construction Industries.
- James Drake Birrell, Director and Chief Executive, Halifax Building Society. For services to the Building Society Movement.
- Samuel Brittan, Principal Economic Commentator and Assistant Editor, Financial Times. For Services to Economic Journalism.
- Arthur David Tim Chessells, Chairman, London Health Services Implementation Group. For services to the NHS in London.
- John Alexander Collins, lately Chairman, Advisory Committee on Business and Environment. For services to the Environment.
- David James Scott Cooksey, Chairman, Audit Commission for Local Authorities and National Health Service in England and Wales. For services to Local Government.
- Graham Martyn Dorey, Bailiff of Guernsey. For services to Guernsey.
- Ernest Hall, O.B.E., Chairman, Dean Clough Industrial Park, Halifax. For services to Training and Enterprise.
- Joseph Edward Hotung. For charitable services, particularly to the British Museum.
- Ralph Frederic Howell, M.P., Member of Parliament for Norfolk North. For political service.
- Dr David Jack, C.B.E., F.R.S., Non-Executive Director, Cancer Research Campaign Technology Ltd. For services to the Pharmaceutical Industry.
- David Laidlaw Knox, M.P., Member of Parliament for Staffordshire Moorlands. For political service.
- Eddie (Elias George) Kulukundis, O.B.E. For charitable services to Sport and to the Arts.
- Peter Large, C.B.E., Chairman, Joint Committee on Mobility for Disabled People.
- Michael Gillam Lickiss, Senior Partner, Grant Thornton (UK). For services to Accountancy.
- Ronald Andrew Baird Miller, C.B.E., Executive Chairman, Dawson International plc. For services to the Textile Industry.
- Kenneth Murray, F.R.S., Professor of Molecular Biology, University of Edinburgh. For services to Science.
- Dr William George Henry Quigley, C.B., Chairman, Ulster Bank Ltd. For services to public life in Northern Ireland.
- Dr David Allan Rees, F.R.S., Secretary and Chief Executive, Medical Research Council. For services to Science.
- Colin Sampson, C.B.E., Q.P.M., H.M. Chief Inspector of Constabulary for Scotland.
- Stanley Clifford Simmons. For services to Medicine.
- Professor Colin Stansfield Smith, C.B.E., County Architect, Hampshire County Council. For services to Architecture.
- Donald Maurice Spiers, C.B., T.D., Controller Aircraft, Ministry of Defence.
- Donald Edgar Stringer, C.B.E. For political service.
- Gilbert Williamson Thompson, O.B.E., Chief Executive, Manchester Airport plc. For services to Air Transport.
- Colin William Carstairs Turner, C.B.E., D.F.C., For political and public service.
- Duncan Amos Watson, C.B.E., Immediate Past President, World Blind Union: formerly Chairman, Access Committee for England. For services to Blind People.
- Peter Robert Wright, C.B.E., Director, The Birmingham Royal Ballet.

Diplomatic Service and Overseas List

- Dick Hurst Pantlin, C.B.E. For services to British interests and the British community in Europe.

=== Order of the Bath ===
==== Knight Grand Cross of the Order of the Bath (GCB) ====
- Admiral Sir John (Beverley) Kerr, K.C.B., A.D.C.

==== Knight Commander of the Order of the Bath (KCB) ====
- Lieutenant General Roger Neil Wheeler, C.B.E., late The Royal Irish Rangers.
- Peter Graham, C.B., Q.C., First Parliamentary Counsel.

==== Companion of the Order of the Bath (CB) ====
Military Division

- Rear Admiral David Kenneth Bawtree.
- Rear Admiral Graham Noel Davis.
- Rear Admiral John Antony Lovell Myres.
- Major General John Alexander James Pooler Barr, C.B.E., late Corps of Royal Engineers.
- Major General Geoffrey William Field, O.B.E., late Corps of Royal Engineers.
- Major General David Phillips Thomson, C.B.E., M.C., late The Argyll and Sutherland Highlanders.
- Air Vice-Marshal John Michael Brook, Q.H.S., Royal Air Force.
- Air Vice-Marshal Paul Derek Clark, Royal Air Force.
- Air Vice-Marshal Gordon Macarthur Ferguson, C.B.E., Royal Air Force.
- Air Vice-Marshal William McCulloch Rae, Royal Air Force.

Civil Division

- David Jeffrey Bentley, Grade 3, Home Office.
- William John Hodges, Permanent Secretary, Department of Agriculture, Northern Ireland Civil Service.
- David John Hodgkins, Grade 3, Health and Safety Executive, Department of Employment.
- Christopher Kingston Howes, Second Commissioner and Chief Executive, The Crown Estate.
- Robert Gordon Scott Johnston, Grade 3, Property Services Agency Service International, Department of the Environment.
- Peter Mackay, Grade 2, Scottish Office.
- Stephen Charles Taylor Matheson, Grade 2, H.M. Board of Inland Revenue.
- Nicholas Lionel John Montagu, Grade 2, Department of Transport.
- Timothy Jean Geoffrey Pratt, lately Deputy Treasury Solicitor.
- Dr John Langdale Reed, Senior Principal Medical Officer, Department of Health.
- Arthur Christie Russell, Grade 3, Department of Trade and Industry.
- Edward Alexander Simpson, Director, Northern Ireland Court Service.
- Dr George Strath Sorrie, lately Chief Executive, Occupational Health Service, Office of Public Service and Science.
- Harold David Spenser Venables, The Official Solicitor, Lord Chancellor's Department.

=== Order of St Michael and St George ===
==== Knight Commander of the Order of St Michael and St George (KCMG) ====
- Alastair Christopher Donald Summerhayes MacRae, C.M.G., British High Commissioner, Lagos.
- The Honourable Humphrey John Hamilton Maud, C.M.G., H.M. Ambassador, Buenos Aires.

==== Companion of the Order of St Michael and St George (CMG) ====
- Geoffrey Edward Fitchew, lately Director General, EC Commission.
- Colin Gatt, Director, Commonwealth Development Corporation Managed Projects. For services to the Commonwealth Development Corporation.
- David Hugh Colvin, Minister, H.M. Embassy, Rome.
- Charles Augustine Kaye Cullimore, British High Commissioner, Kampala.
- Anthony St John Howard Figgis, Foreign and Commonwealth Office.
- Richard Hugh Turton Gozney, Foreign and Commonwealth Office.
- John Francis Ryde Martin, Counsellor, United Kingdom Mission to the United Nations, New York.
- David Norman Reddaway, M.B.E., Counsellor and Chargé d'Affaires, H.M. Embassy, Tehran.
- Michael John Robinson, Counsellor, H.M. Embassy, Belgrade.
- Thomas William Savage, Foreign and Commonwealth Office.
- Brian Smith, O.B.E., British High Commissioner, Port of Spain.
- David Critchlow Walker, C.V.O., British High Commissioner, Accra.
- Brian Watkins, British High Commissioner, Mbabane.
- Philip Henry Davan Wetton, Director General for British Trade Development in Italy, H.M. Consulate-General, Milan.

=== Royal Victorian Order ===
==== Knight Commander of the Royal Victorian Order (KCVO) ====
- Colonel Peter Hilton, M.C.
- David William Neil Landale.
- Colonel Geoffrey Walter Fownes Luttrell, M.C.
- Brian Henry McGrath, C.V.O.

==== Commander of the Royal Victorian Order (CVO) ====
- Frank Reginald Francis, L.V.O., M.B.E.
- John Haslam, L.V.O.
- Graham Norbert Kennedy.
- George David Inge-Innes-Lillingston, C.B.E., D.L.

==== Lieutenant of the Royal Victorian Order (LVO) ====
- The Most Honourable Elizabeth Shirley Vaughan, Marchioness of Anglesey, D.B.E.
- Marilyn Jean, Mrs Atkinson.
- Colonel Harold Frederick Oberlinne Bewsher, O.B.E.
- John Edwin Brook.
- Thomas Henry Davies.
- Susan Lillian Derry, M.V.O.
- Lieutenant Colonel Donald James Charles Wickes, M.V.O.
- Cyril Raymond Woods, M.V.O.

==== Member of the Royal Victorian Order (MVO) ====
- Lynda Margaret, Mrs Hopkins.
- David Rankin-Hunt, T.D.
- Michael William Desmond MacKey, B.E.M.
- Carmel Eileen Mary, Mrs Murphy.
- Inspector Thomas Anthony Parker, Metropolitan Police.
- Inspector Roger Ernest Reynolds, Metropolitan Police.
- Squadron Leader Robert Morrison Shields, Royal Air Force.
- Michael John Thresher.
- Miss Gwendoline Annette Wilkin.
- David McKenzie Yeaman.

==== Bar to the Royal Victorian Medal (Silver) (RVM) ====
- Patrick Joseph Carroll, R.V.M.
- Pauline Patricia, Mrs Stanley, R.V.M.
- Richard James Thomas, R.V.M.

==== Royal Victorian Medal (Silver) (RVM) ====
- Joseph Hervé Yves Chevrier.
- Arthur Burton Cummings.
- Petty Officer Marine Engineering Mechanic (Mechanical) Michael Lawrence Currell.
- Terence James Gardiner.
- Clive John Godfrey.
- Miss June Marguerite Theresa Guerin.
- Sergeant Peter John Hersey, Royal Air Force.
- Dennis Leslie Lazenby.
- Miss Betty Leek.
- Stephen John Matthews.
- Sergeant Kenneth Erwin Millar, Royal Air Force.
- Kenneth John Richardson.
- Paul Kevin Whybrew.

=== Order of the Companions of Honour (CH) ===
- Charles Hubert Sisson, Writer and Poet. For services to Literature.
- Dr Elsie May Widdowson, C.B.E., F.R.S., President, British Nutrition Foundation. For services to Science.

=== Order of the British Empire ===
==== Dame Commander of the Order of the British Empire (DBE) ====
- Miss Thora Hird (Mrs Scott), O.B.E., Actress. For services to Drama.
- Muriel Sarah, Mrs Spark, O.B.E., Writer. For services to Literature.

==== Knight Commander of the Order of the British Empire (KBE) ====
- John Crichton-Stuart, Marquess of Bute. For services to the Arts and Heritage, and to public life in Scotland.
- Sir Peter Parker, L.V.O. For services to public life.

==== Commander of the Order of the British Empire (CBE) ====
Military division

- Brigadier Michael Anthony Browne (474111), late Corps of Royal Engineers.
- Colonel Royston Leslie Giles, O.B.E. (453607), late The Gloucestershire Regiment.
- Colonel William Bernard Ibbetson (471286), late The Green Howards.
- Brigadier (now Major General) Anthony David Pigott O.B.E. (477816), late Corps of Royal Engineers
- Colonel John Austin Thorp, M.B.E. (477436), late Corps of Royal Engineers.
- Brigadier Thomas Ian Macdonald Waugh, M.B.E. (475258), late Royal Corps of Signals.

Civil division

- John Beadle, lately Chairman, Peak Park Joint Planning Board. For services to the National Parks Movement.
- Jeremy Wilson Beech, Q.F.S.M., Chief Fire Officer of Kent.
- Anthony John Booth, Managing Director, Special Businesses and International Affairs British Telecom plc. For services to the Telecommunications Industry.
- Carlton Boswell, T.D., lately Her Majesty's Chief Agricultural Inspector, Health and Safety Executive, Department of Employment.
- Elizabeth Louise, Mrs. Botting (Mrs. Carpenter). For services to the Top Salaries Review Body and to Personal Finance Broadcasting.
- Peter Thomas Brazier, lately Grade 5, Central Office of Information.
- Ian Brownlie Q.C., Chichele Professor of Public International Law, University of Oxford. For services to International Law.
- William Campbell Bryden, Head of Drama Television, BBC Scotland. Associate Director, the Royal National Theatre.
- Philip George Burke, Professor of Mathematical Physics, Queen's University Belfast. For services to Science.
- John Halcrow Burrow, O.B.E., Chief Constable, Essex Police.
- Norman John Terence Butler, Director of Social Services, Hampshire County Council.
- Christopher James Campbell, Chairman, British Shipbuilders Corporation. For services to the Shipbuilding Industry.
- Peter James Clarke, Grade 4, Forestry Commission.
- Miss Lesley Collier, Principal Ballerina, Royal Ballet. For services to Ballet.
- Patrick Collinson, Regius Professor of Modern History, University of Cambridge.
- Nigel Lawrence Colne, Non-Executive Director, Department of Social Security's Departmental Management Board.
- Miss Frances Mary Cook, Deputy Chairman, Public Works Loan Board. For services to Local Government.
- Paul Christopher Richard Crossley, Pianist and Artistic Director, London Sinfonietta. For services to Music.
- Timothy Ernest Daniels, Grade 5, Ministry of Defence.
- Frank John Davies, Chief Executive, Rockware Group plc. For services to the Glass Industry.
- William Devlin, Director, Local Enterprise Development Unit. For services to Economics and Industry in Northern Ireland.
- Roy Leonard Dommett, Deputy Chief Scientific Officer, Defence Research Agency.
- Dr. Alastair Geoffrey Donald, O.B.E., President, the Royal College of General Practitioners. For services to Medicine.
- Robert Trench Fox, Vice Chairman, Kleinwort Benson Group. For services to Banking.
- Dr. Albert Franks, Grade 5, Department of Trade and Industry.
- Thelma, Mrs. Golding, Chairman, Hounslow and Spelthorne Community and Mental Health NHS Trust.
- Stanley Richard Goodchild, Chief Education Officer, Berkshire. For services to Education.
- Nicholas Thomas Grimshaw, Architect. For services to Architecture.
- Bunty Moffat, Mrs. Gunn, O.B.E., lately Chairman, Lanarkshire Health Board. For services to the National Health Service in Scotland.
- Peter Haggett, Professor of Urban and Regional Geography, University of Bristol.
- Reginald John Hales. For political and public service.
- Paul Bertrand Hamlyn, Publisher. Chairman, Reed International Books and Director of Reed Elsevier. For charitable services, particularly to the Arts.
- Alexander Philip Hendry. For political and public service.
- David Henry Hills, lately Grade 4, Ministry of Defence.
- Dr. Geoffrey Hobbs, lately Grade 5, Ministry of Agriculture, Fisheries and Food.
- John Folliott Charles Hull. For services to the City and to Industry.
- James Malcolm Marcus Humphrey, D.L. For political and public service.
- Nigel Margrave Johnston, Grade 5, Home Office.
- Frederick Patrick Mair Johnston, Chairman, Johnston Press plc. For services to Newspaper Publishing.
- Geraint Stanley Jones, Chief Executive, S4C. For services to Broadcasting.
- Professor Desmond Gareth Julian, Consultant Medical Director, British Heart Foundation.
- Roger Kent, Director, Waverley Care Trust. For public service in Scotland.
- Bernard Henry Knight, Professor of Forensic Pathology, University of Wales College of Medicine. Honorary Consultant Pathologist to South Glamorgan Health Authority.
- Michael Frederick Knox, Grade 5, H.M. Board of Custom and Excise.
- Norman Lessels, Chairman, Standard Life. For services to the Insurance Industry.
- Robert Patrick Lister, Chairman, Board of Governors, Coventry University.
- Paul Edward Loveluck, Chief Executive, Wales Tourist Board. For services to Tourism in Wales.
- Stuart Randolph Lyons, Chairman and Chief Executive, Royal Doulton Ltd. For services to the China Industry.
- Mrs. Morag MacDonald Simpson, Secretary to the Post Office Corporation. For services to the Post Office.
- Dr. Iain Mackay MacFarlane, Chairman, Latin American Trade Advisory Group. For services to Export and to ICI Fibres.
- Ian Roy Marks, Chairman, Packaging Panel, Food and Drink Federation. For services to the Food Industry.
- Professor John Stanley Marsh, Chairman, Agricultural Wages Board. For services to the Agricultural Industry.
- Dr. Robert James Maxwell, Secretary and Chief Executive, The King's Fund. For services to the Health Service in London.
- Dr. Archibald Dewar McIntyre, Principal Medical Officer, Scottish Home and Health Department.
- Robert Murray McKinlay, Chairman, British Aerospace Airbus Ltd. For services to the Aircraft Industry.
- Duncan James McPherson, Convener, Highland Regional Council. For services to Local Government in Scotland.
- John Stanley Metcalfe, Professor of Economics, University of Manchester. For services to Science.
- Dennis Mitchell, Chairman, South West Regional Advisory Board, National Rivers Authority. For services to the Fisheries Industry.
- Terence Moore, Chief Executive Officer, Conoco Ltd. For services to the Oil Industry.
- Colonel Alan Frank Niekerk, T.D., D.L., Chairman, Council of the Territorial Auxiliary and Volunteer Reserve Association's Pension Plan. For services to TAVRA.
- Miss Felicity Joan Palmer, Opera Singer. For services to Music.
- David Lewis Pascall, lately Chairman, National Curriculum Council. For services to Education.
- Professor John Allan Patmore, Vice Chairman, Sports Council. For services to Sport.
- Anthony Cecil Peak, Joint Deputy Chief Executive, VSEL Consortium plc. For services to Submarine Building.
- Edward John Peett, Director, Vodafone Group plc. For services to the Telecommunications Industry.
- Christopher Selwyn Porteous, Solicitor for the Metropolitan Police. For services to the Metropolitan Police.
- Dr. Ian Mathieson Hamilton Preston, Chief Executive, Scottish Power. For services to the Electricity Industry.
- George Karoly Radda, British Heart Foundation Professor of Molecular Cardiology, University of Oxford. For services to Science.
- John Rayner, Rabbi Emeritus, Liberal Jewish Synagogue.
- Brynley Roberts, Librarian, National Library for Wales. For services to the Welsh Language and Literature and to Librarianship in Wales.
- Edward John Roberts, Chief Executive, Heath Springs Ltd. For services to Business and to public life in the West Midlands.
- John Arthur Robson, Senior Principal Inspector of Taxes, Her Majesty's Board of Inland Revenue.
- Duncan Alexander Ross, lately Chairman, Southern Electric plc. For services to the Electricity Supply Industry.
- John Alexander Ross, President, National Farmers' Union of Scotland. For services to Agriculture in Scotland.
- Simon John Sacher, Chairman, Whitehall and Industry Group. For services to Industry.
- Mary Ethel, Mrs. Salisbury, D.L., lately Chairperson, Wiltshire County Council. For services to Local Government.
- Peter Sebastian. For public services in London.
- Clifford William Smith, D.L. For services to Local Government, particularly in East Anglia.
- Professor David Grahame Grahame-Smith, Chairman, Advisory Council on the Misuse of Drugs.
- Professor Harry Smith. For services to the Ministry of Defence.
- Graham Henry Stacy, Director of Professional Standards, Price Waterhouse Europe. For services to Accountancy.
- Dr. (Isobel Jane) Nuala Sterling, Chairman, Standing Medical Advisory Committee. For services to Medicine.
- Rex Herbert Moss Symons, Chairman, The Poole Hospital Trust. For service to Training and Education.
- Bernard David Taylor, Executive Chairman, Medeva plc. For services to Export and to the Pharmaceutical Industry.
- Professor Jean Olwen Thomas, F.R.S., Professor of Macromolecular Biochemistry, University of Cambridge. For services to Science.
- Peter Colum Tudball, Chairman, The Baltic Exchange. For services to the Shipping Industry.
- Alan David Tuffin, General Secretary, Union of Communication Workers. For services to Industrial Relations and to Health and Safety.
- Denis Tunnicliffe, Managing Director, London Underground Ltd. For services to Transport in London.
- William Guy Walker, Chairman, Van den Berghs and Jurgens Ltd. For services to the Food Industry.
- Commander Leslie Michael Macdonald Saunders Watson, D.L., Royal Navy (Retired), lately Chairman, The British Library Board.
- Dr. Roger Williams, Consultant Physician, King's College Hospital; Director, Institute of Liver Studies, King's College, London.
- Alexander Winton, Q.F.S.M., H.M. Chief Inspector of Fire Services for Scotland.
- Charles Richard Woosnam, Forestry Commissioner. For services to the Forestry Industry.

Diplomatic Service and Overseas List

- John Chan Cho-chak, L.V.O., O.B.E., J.P. Secretary for Education and Manpower, Hong Kong.
- Thomas Chen Tseng-tao, Director Hang Lung Development Company, Hong Kong.
- Kutlu Tekin Fuad, Justice of Appeal, Hong Kong.
- Michael Edmund Ivor Kempster, Justice of Appeal, Hong Kong.
- Professor Jeremy Randall Knowles, Dean of Faculty of Arts and Sciences, Harvard University.
- Anthony Bernard Nicholas Morey, H.M. Ambassador, Ulaanbaatar.
- Lieutenant Colonel Henry Colin Barry Overbury, O.B.E., lately Head, Merger Task Force, European Commission, Brussels.

==== Officer of the Order of the British Empire (OBE) ====
Military Division

Royal Navy

- Commander John Ewart Dykes, Royal Navy.
- Commander John Fenwick, Royal Navy.
- Commander Leon Richard Hayward, Royal Navy.
- The Reverend Edward Wynne Jones, Royal Navy.
- Commander Richard Derek Leaman, Royal Navy.
- Major Jonathan James Bailey Lear, Royal Marines.
- Commander James Molloy, Royal Navy.
- Commander Colin O'Keeffe, Royal Navy.
- Commander Alan Thomas John Padwick, Royal Navy.
- Commander Anthony Rose, Royal Navy.
- Captain (X) John Patrick Thompson, Royal Fleet Auxiliary Service.

Army

- Lieutenant Colonel Martin Graham Clive Amlot (484810), The King's Regiment.
- Lieutenant Colonel Peter John Cable (485682), The Gloucestershire Regiment.
- Lieutenant Colonel (now Colonel) Michael Anthony Charlton-Weedy (491560), late Royal Regiment of Artillery.
- Lieutenant Colonel Stephen Anthony Coltman (478572), Royal Corps of Signals.
- Lieutenant Colonel Alan Paul Deed (491440), The Royal Anglian Regiment.
- Lieutenant Colonel David Henry Flower (508016), Corps of Royal Engineers.
- Lieutenant Colonel John Patrick Hoskinson (495350), Corps of Royal Engineers.
- Lieutenant Colonel Nicholas Arthur King, M.B.E. (471294), The Light Infantry.
- Lieutenant Colonel David William Lewis, T.D. (491666), Corps of Royal Engineers, Territorial Army.
- Lieutenant Colonel John Kingsford Marsham (472579), The Light Infantry.
- Lieutenant Colonel Sebastian John Lechmere Roberts (502909), Irish Guards.
- Lieutenant Colonel Derek James Richardson Smail, T.D. (485927), The Royal Regiment of Fusiliers, Territorial Army.
- Lieutenant Colonel Anthony William Snook (479469), The Parachute Regiment.
- Major (Local Lieutenant Colonel) Bernard Thomas Tyler, M.B.E. (513435), Corps of Royal Electrical and Mechanical Engineers.
- Lieutenant Colonel David John Wilson, M.B.E. (476675), Army Air Corps.
- Lieutenant Colonel Anton Young (508737), Royal Logistic Corps (formerly RAOC).

Civil division

- Dr. Gary James Keith Acres, Director, Technology Planning, Johnson Matthey. For services to Energy Efficiency.
- William Joseph Ainsley, Senior Manager, Chevaline Performance Group, British Aerospace (Dynamics) Ltd. For services to the Defence Industry.
- James Napier Alison, H.M. Staff Inspector of Schools, Scottish Office Education Department.
- Dr. Anthony Allibone, M.B.E., Chairman, Health Committee, General Medical Council.
- Keith Appelbee, lately Managing Director, GEC-Alsthom. For servicesto Export and to the Engineering Industry.
- Edward George Arnold, Principal Professional and Technology Officer, Ministry of Defence.
- Michael Terence Aspel, Television Presenter, Independent Television. For services to Broadcasting.
- Kenneth Bains, Inspector of Taxes SP, H.M. Board of Inland Revenue.
- Robert Melville Balfour. For political service.
- Alan Douglas Barker, Treasurer, Princess Mary House Branch; Financial Adviser, West Yorkshire Branch, British Red Cross Society.
- David Maxwell Barker. For political service.
- Dr. Keith Chartres Barnett. For services to the Animal Health Trust, Newmarket.
- Michael Allen Barrett, General Secretary and Treasurer, National League of the Blind and Disabled. For services to the Blind and the Disabled.
- Margaret, Mrs. Baskerville, Veterinary Officer, Ministry of Defence.
- Trevor Bassett, Q F.S.M., Chief Fire Officer, Dorset Fire Brigade.
- John Garry Beaumont, Executive Director and Chief Ship Surveyor, Lloyd's Register of Shipping. For services to the Shipping Industry.
- John Charles Beech, Grade 7, Department of the Environment.
- Lilian Margery, Mrs. Bennett, Chairman, Manpower. For services to Employment and to the Butler Trust.
- Gordon Harry Berlyne. For services to the public and to the community in Manchester.
- Dr. Maurice Bichard, Technical Director, Pig Improvement Company. For services to the Pig Breeding Industry.
- Cedric George Blackbourne, Managing Director, Karl Construction Ltd. For services to the Construction Industry in Northern Ireland.
- Kenneth William Blyth, Secretary, Independent Television Commission. For Services to Broadcasting.
- Edwin Seymour Bontoft, Honorary Treasurer, Royal Association for Disability and Rehabilitation. For services to the Disabled.
- Mark James Bowerman. For political service.
- John Michael Bowers, A Chairman, Consumer Credit Licensing Appeals. For services to Consumer Affairs.
- Seamus Brendan Boyle, Grade 7, Industrial Development Board, Northern Ireland Civil Service.
- Anthony Charles Brown, Managing Director, F. C. Brown (Steel Equipment) Ltd. For services to the Steel Industry.
- Craig Milne Brown, Principal, Dundee College of Further Education. For services to Further Education.
- Professor Kenneth Martin Brown, lately President, South Wales Institute of Engineers. For services to Health and Safety.
- Rowland Percival Brown, Headteacher, Royal Grammar School, High Wycombe. For services to Education.
- Walter Charles Brown, Vice President and National Treasurer, 1940 Dunkirk Veterans Association.
- Donald Hood Brydon, Chairman, Barclays de Zoete Wedd Investment Management. For services to Commerce.
- John Burn, Headmaster, Longbenton Community College, Newcastle upon Tyne. For services to Education.
- Annie Dick Mrs. Burnett, Chairman, Social Work Committee, Borders Regional Council. For services to Local Government.
- Denis Jack Butt, Grade 7, Plant Pathologist, Horticulture Research International.
- Thomas James Carr, M.B.E., Artist. For services to Art.
- John Carol Case, For services to Music.
- Lieutenant Colonel Colin Cheshire. For services to Rifle Shooting.
- David Nigel Chesters, Grade 7, H.M. Board of Customs and Excise.
- Robert Charles Clark, Grade 6, Department of the Environment.
- Richard Clough, M.B.E., General Secretary, Social Care Association. For services to Residential Child Care.
- Kenneth Howard Coates, Executive Chairman and Chief Executive, Meggitt pic. For services to Export and to the Aerospace Industry.
- Colin George Campbell Cocks, Vice Chairman, Dowty Electronic Systems Division, Dowty Group pic. For services to the Defence Industry.
- Morris Cohen, Chairman, Morris Cohen (Underwear) Ltd. For services to the Clothing Industry.
- David Lionel Coleman, President, Royal Pharmaceutical Society of Great Britain. For services to Pharmacy.
- Peter John Cooper, Consultant Engineer, J Sainsbury plc. For services to Food Refrigeration.
- Martin Dewe Corke, Chairman West Suffolk Health Authority. For services to the National Health Service.
- Graham Ronald Court, Leader, Rhymney Valley District Council. For services to Local Government in Wales.
- Herbert Colin Coxall, Life President, Association of International Courier and Express Services. For services to the Courier Industry.
- Stanley Albert Coxhead, Founder, Association of Authorised Public Accountants. For services to Accountancy.
- Alan Croston, Chief Probation Officer, Somerset Probation Service.
- Richard Cummings, Member, Scottish Consultative Council on the Curriculum. For services to Education.
- Walter Hugh Davidson, Managing Director, Peter Scott and Company Ltd. For services to the Knitwear Industry.
- Professor Albina Catherine de la Mare, Professor of Palaeography, King's College, London.
- Alan de Pennington, Professor of Computer Aided Engineering, University of Leeds. For services to Science.
- Captain Ebenezer Thomson Denholm, R.N., Chairman, Cornwall Branch, Soldiers', Sailors' and Airmen's Families Association.
- Gordon Ernest Francis Denman, Principal Collector of Taxes, H.M. Board of Inland Revenue.
- John Denton, Grade 6, Office of Population Censuses and Surveys.
- John Kennedy Dewar. For political service.
- Dr Kenneth Edward Donnan, Chairman, Northern Ireland Association for Mental Health. For services to the Mentally Ill in Northern Ireland.
- Elizabeth Deirdre, Mrs. Doocey. For political and public service.
- Philip Percy Cooper Drabble, Naturalist, writer and broadcaster.
- James Michael Durose, lately Grade 7, Home Office.
- Maurice George Ebison, lately Deputy Chief Executive, Institute of Physics. For services to Science.
- Peter Robert Ellis, lately Director, Veterinary Epidemiology Economics Research Unit, University of Reading. For services to Science.
- Arthur John Evans, Headteacher, Penydre High School, Merthyr Tydfil. For services to Education.
- Harry Marshall Fairhurst, Consultant Architect to English Heritage. For services to Architecture.
- Peter Gilbert Fitzgerald, Managing Director, Fitzgerald Lighting Ltd. For services to the Lighting Industry and to Economic Development in Cornwall.
- Professor George Dick Forwell, Chief Administrative Medical Officer and Director of Public Health, Greater Glasgow Health Board. For services to Medicine in Scotland.
- Ian Fowler, Principal Chief Clerk, Inner London Magistrates' Court Service. For services to the Judicial System.
- Dr. Hans Ludwig Frankel, Consultant, National Spinal Injuries Centre, Stoke Mandeville Hospital. For services to Medicine.
- Robert Wilkinson Fraser, Director, Water and Drainage Services, Borders Regional Council. For services to Local Government.
- George Philip Furze, lately DS5C Grade, Foreign and Commonwealth Office.
- Samuel Richard Gallop, Honorary Chairman, Opportunities for People with Disabilities. For services to the Disabled.
- Professor William Gelletly, Professor of Physics, University of Surrey. For services to Science.
- Dr. Tony Gibson. For services to the Neighbourhood Initiatives Foundation.
- Henry Samuel Oscroft Gilbert, President, Merseyside and Cheshire Rent Assessment Panel. For public service in Merseyside.
- Alexander Glass, Chairman, Children's Panel, Highland Region.
- Miss Rumer Godden (Margaret Haynes, Mrs. Dixon), Novelist. For services to Literature.
- Florence Barbara, Mrs. Grains, Chairman, Shetland Health Board. For services to the NHS.
- Stanley Hagan, Grade 7, Chief Clerk, Liverpool Combined Court Centre, Lord Chancellor's Department.
- Anthony John Hall, C.P.M., Grade 6, Ministry of Defence.
- Thomas Douglas Hall, Principal Scientific Officer, Scottish Agricultural Science Agency, Scottish Office.
- Jonathan David Harris, President, Continuing Professional Development Foundation. For services to Further Education.
- David Heaton, lately Consultant, Museums and Galleries Commission. For services to Heritage.
- Kenneth James Heyes, Bursar, King Alfred's College Hampshire. For services to Higher Education.
- Anne Mary, Mrs. Hobson. For political and public service.
- Henry Egar Garfield Hodge. For services to the Social Security Advisory Committee.
- Miss Anna Margaret Home, Head of Children's Programmes, BBC Television. For services to Broadcasting.
- Professor Norman Webster Hudson. For services to Soil Conservation.
- Evelyn Gervase Carson Hulbert, Chairman, Moore Stephens International. For services to Accountancy.
- Miss Mary Millicent Hulbert, Headteacher, The Willink School, Reading. For services to Education.
- Dr. Donald Hunt. For services to the Three Choirs Festival, Worcester.
- Philip Alexander Hunt, Director, National Association of Health Authorities and Trusts. For services to the NHS.
- Hubert Robin Hutton, lately Director General, British Merchant Banking and Securities Houses Association. For services to the Finance Industry.
- George Howard Jackson, Deputy Chief Executive, Royal Agricultural Society of England. For services to Agriculture.
- David Jason (David White), Actor. For services to Drama.
- James Jeffrey, Farmer. For services to Agriculture in the Borders, Scotland.
- Miss Celia Avril Rees-Jenkins, Grade 7, Department of the Environment.
- Terence Anthony Johnson, Inspector of Taxes SP, H.M. Board of Inland Revenue.
- Adam Johnstone, Chairman, Broadwood Trust. For charitable services to the Royal Academy of Music.
- Graham Laurie Jones, Grade 7, Department of Transport.
- Neville Jones. For political and public service.
- Noel Jordan, lately Chairman, Northern Ireland Building Regulations Advisory Committee. For services to the Construction Industry.
- Patricia, Mrs. Jorgensen, Chairman of the council, the Children's Society. For services to Young People.
- Professor Janet Kear, lately Director of Centres, Wildfowl and Wetlands Trust. For services to Wildfowl Conservation.
- Kenneth Charles Keen, lately Grade 6, Department of Health.
- Malcolm David Kelly, Chairman and Managing Director, Integrated Hydraulics Ltd. For services to the Hydraulic Equipment Industry.
- Douglas Henry Kent. For services to the Botanical Society of the British Isles.
- Roger William Knight, Grade 7, Home Office.
- Robert MacLeod Lacey. For political and public service.
- Dr. Elizabeth Laverick, Honorary Secretary, Women's Engineering Society. For services to women in Engineering and Science.
- Professor George Jeffery Leigh, Deputy Head, Agriculture and Food Research Council Nitrogen Fixation Laboratory. For services to Science.
- Mike Leigh, Writer and Director. For services to the Film Industry.
- Gordon Lund, Principal Building Surveyor, H.M. Board of Inland Revenue.
- Miss Joyce Irene Magor, Grade 6, Overseas Development Administration.
- Ian Marr, Chairman, Aberdeen and District Milk Marketing Board. For services to the Dairy Industry.
- David Rupert Mayes, Headteacher, Cockshut Hill Comprehensive School, Birmingham. For services to Education.
- Professor Daniel Vincent McCaughan, lately Board Chairman, Industrial Research and Technology Unit. For services to Technological Advancement in Northern Ireland.
- Captain Norman David McFarlane, Grade 6, Department of Transport.
- Miss Anne Geraldine McGrath, Principal, Little Flower Girls' School, Belfast. For services to Education.
- Robert Ian Shaw Meadows, Managing Director, R. S. Clare and Company Ltd. For services to Industry.
- Andrew Robert Mitchell, I.S.O. For services to Sport for the Disabled in Scotland.
- Peter Crichton Mitchell, Q.P.M., Deputy Chief Constable, Strathclyde Police.
- Robert Alan Monkhouse, Entertainer. For charitable services.
- The Very Reverend Dr. Peter Clement Moore, Dean and Rector, St. Albans Cathedral.
- Sydney Mortimer, Specialist Inspector, Health and Safety Executive, Department of Employment.
- Professor Helen Christine Muir, Director, Department of Applied Psychology, College of Aeronautics, Cranfield. For services to Transport Safety.
- Sister Carina Muldoon, Director, St Joseph's Training School, Middletown, Northern Ireland. For services to Young People.
- Michael Anthony Muskett, Grade 6, Ministry of Defence.
- Michael Joseph Mylod, Deputy Chief Constable, Hampshire Constabulary.
- Charles John Naylor, lately National Secretary, National Council of YMCAs.
- Procter Naylor, Director, East Anglia Tourist Board. For services to Tourism.
- Richard Neale, lately Member, Occupational Pensions Board.
- Dr. Stephen Nepaulsingh, Member, School Examinations and Assessment Council. For services to Education.
- Harry Noble, lately Director, Economic Development and Planning, Coventry City Council. For services to Local Government.
- Charles Roger Macpherson Notcutt, Chairman, Notcutt Nurseries Ltd. For services to the Horticultural Industry.
- Sheila Dorothy, Mrs. Oldham. For political and public service.
- Andrew Hugh Fitzgerald Olson. For services to Energy Conservation in London.
- Professor Robert Owen, D.L. For services to the National Health Service in Wales.
- Ann Veronica Margaret, Mrs. Palmer, M.B.E., Director General, Bus and Coach Council. For services to the Bus and Coach Industry.
- Cameron Holdsworth Parker. For services to the Marine Engineering Industry.
- Keith John Parker, Editor and Director, Express and Star, Wolverhampton. For services to Journalism.
- Michael Henry Parkinson, Vice-Chairman, Bradford and District Training and Enterprise Council. For services to Training and Education.
- Lieutenant Colonel Godfrey Philip Desmond Pease, R.M. (Retired), Deputy Representative Chairman, Southern Area, Sea Cadet Corps.
- Harold Lindsay Perks. For political and public service.
- Jill Elizabeth, Mrs. Pitkeathley, Director, Carers' National Association. For services to the support of Carers.
- Rudolf Theodor Felix Plaut, Chairman, Northmace pic. For services to Industry in Wales.
- Douglas Thomas Ponsford, Grade 7, Department of Trade and Industry.
- Brian James Porteous, Grade 6, H.M. Treasury.
- Rosalind, Mrs. Preston, Vice-President, Board of Deputies of British Jews and Honorary Vice-President, National Council of Women of Great Britain.
- Miss Wendy Anne Jopling Ramshaw (Mrs. Watkins), Jeweller. For services to Art.
- Derek Rawson, lately City Engineer, Birmingham. For services to Municipal Engineering.
- Dr. James Dudley Read, Director, National Health Service Centre for Coding and Classification. For services to Medicine.
- Major Norman Ricketts, Chairman 75th Anniversary Committee, King George's Fund for Sailors.
- Miss Anne Christine Elizabeth Rider, Retired Maternity Services Manager University College Hospital London. For services to the Midwifery ' Profession.
- Rex Roberts. For political and public service.
- Robin John Kerfoot Roberts, Grade 6, Department of Social Security.
- Douglas George Robertson, Vice President, Royal Scottish Corporation. For services to the Elderly in London.
- James Robson, Divisional Veterinary Officer, Ministry of Agriculture, Fisheries and Food.
- Harold Kenneth Rose, Member, Norfolk County Council. For services to Local Government.
- Miss (Katherine) Patricia Routledge, Actress. For services to Drama.
- Andrew Roxburgh. For services to Association Football.
- Brian David Scott, Director, Great Western, British Railways. For services to Rail Transport.
- John Arthur Seaman, Doctor, Save the Children Fund. For services to World Health.
- John Norman Sefton, Chairman, British Visqueen Ltd. For service to the Chemical and Plastic Industries.
- Michael Aylwin Selfe, lately County Surveyor, Essex County Council. For services to Highways Engineering.
- Penelope Ann, Mrs. Seligman, Chair, Board of Visitors, HM Prison Whitemoor. For services to Prison Board of Visitors.
- David Shackels, Principal, East Tyrone College of Further Education. For services to Further Education.
- Yan Ji Shieh, Director, Refugee Action. For services to the Resettlement of Refugees.
- Fiona Patricia West, Mrs Simpson, General Dental Practitioner, Co. Antrim. Member, General Dental Council. For services to Dentistry.
- Trevor Slater, lately Chairman, Ferguslie Park Business Support Group. For services to Inner-City Regeneration.
- John Vernon Smyth, General Secretary, Ulster Farmers' Union. For services to Agriculture in Northern Ireland.
- Alan Robert Staff, Commercial Director, Vosper Thornycroft. For services to Export and to the Defence Industry.
- Dr. Anthony John Stanton, Negotiator General Medical Services Committee. For services to Medicine.
- Dr Hilary Stevenson, Principal Scientific Officer, Department of Agriculture, Northern Ireland Civil Service.
- William James Stewart, Assistant Chief Constable, Royal Ulster Constabulary.
- Dr. Michael Adrian Stroud. For Human Endeavour and for charitable services.
- Richard David Stroud, Grade 6, Department of Employment.
- Professor Margaret Jean Talbot. For services to Sport and to Physical Education.
- David John Tarr, Consultant, Balfour Beatty Power Construction Ltd (Hong Kong). For services to Export and to the Transmission Industry.
- John William Reginald Taylor, Commonwealth Vice President, Royal Life Saving Society. For services to Life Saving.
- George William Terrans, lately Chairman, Durham County Council. For services to Local Government.
- Richard G. Tettenborn. For services to Local Government in Wales.
- Miss Pamela Patricia Thayer, I.S.O., President, Pre-School Playgroups Association. For services to the Playgroup Movement.
- Andrew Thomson, Professor, School of Management, Open University. For services to Further Education.
- Nancy, Mrs. Tovey, M.B.E. For political service.
- Arthur Walter Townsend, lately Chairman and Managing Director, Oxford Bus Company. For services to the Bus Industry.
- Norman Elliott Trape, Grade 7, First Secretary, British Embassy, Paris.
- Richard John Tucker, Principal Information Officer, Ministry of Defence.
- William Charles Frederick Turner, Special Operations Director, Royal Ordnance pic, Chorley. For services to the Defence Industry.
- Sir Ranulph Twistleton-Wykeham-Fiennes, Bt. For Human Endeavour and for charitable services.
- Peter Charles van Geersdaele, Grade 7, National Maritime Museum.
- Miss Michelle (Mickey) Walker. For services to Women's Golf.
- Jeremy John Ware. For political and public service.
- Geoffrey Roy Watson, Grade 7, Department of Trade and Industry.
- Arthur Melville Reid Watts. For services to the public and to the community in the Forest of Dean.
- Stanley Webster. For services to the Prime Minister's Advisory Panel on the Citizen's Charter.
- Terence Gerard Weiler, lately Chief Usher of the Cenotaph Ceremony.
- Christopher Bevis Eve White, Grade 6, Office of Fair Trading.
- Neville Whittaker, Director, North East Civic Trust. For services to Urban Regeneration in the North East of England.
- Brian Charles Willett, lately Grade 7, Department for Education.
- Alan Philip Willis, General Secretary, British Amusement Catering Trade Association. For services to the Coin-Operated Amusement Machines Industry.
- Brian Errington Willis, Principal Professional and Technology Officer, Ministry of Defence.
- Ralph Stewart Wilson, Headteacher, Armadale Academy, West Lothian. For services to Education.
- Geoffrey Willingale Wood, Inspector of Taxes SP, H.M. Board of Inland Revenue.
- Professor Jack Williamson Wood, Regional Assessor, Community Charge Registration Officer and Electoral Registration Officer, Strathclyde Region. For services to Local Government.
- Anne Margaret, Mrs. Yates, lately Director, Southern African Advanced Education Project.
- Cynthia, Mrs. Yates. For political service.

==== Member of the Order of the British Empire (MBE) ====
Civil division

- John Leonard Collier, Services to the Community in Cheadle, Stoke on Trent, Staffordshire,
- Miss Alice Gaynor Griffith Brown, Honorary Life Member, Ulster Society for the Prevention of Cruelty to Animals. For services to Animal Welfare in Northern Ireland.
- Rose, Mrs Canning, Inspector and Assembler, Northern Telecom (NI) Ltd. For charitable services to the community in Co. Antrim, Northern Ireland.
- Miss Olga Mavis Charlton, lately Deputy Principal, Northern Ireland Office.
- Margaret Elizabeth, Mrs Cooke, Administrative Assistant, Northern Ireland Civil Service.
- William Noel Davison, Transport Centre Supervisor, Western Education and Library Board, Co. Tyrone, Northern Ireland.
- Margaret Elizabeth, Mrs Dawson, Administrative Officer, Department of Economic Development, Northern Ireland Civil Service.
- Frank Donnelly, Supervisor and Trade Union Convener, Larne Borough Council. For services to Industrial Relations.
- The Reverend Canon Bruce Duncan, Chairman, Northorpe Hall Trust. For services to the Care of Young People.
- Thomas Richard Dunwoody. For services to Horse Racing.
- Elizabeth, Mrs Fletcher, Caretaker, Ulidia Centre for Resources and Training, Belfast.
- Albert Brian Forde, Constable, Royal Ulster Constabulary.
- George Alan Gardner, Owner, Beechwood Laboratories. For services to Microbiological Development.
- John George Gibson, Ambulanceman, Royal Belfast Hospital for Sick Children.
- Miss Agnes Mary Harkin, Cook Supervisor, Termoncanice Primary School, Limavady, Northern Ireland.
- Francis Harvey, Supervisor, Northern Ireland Railways.
- Stephen Gordon Hendry. For services to snooker.
- John Gilbert Hill, Senior Lecturer, Down College of Further Education, Ballynahinch, Northern Ireland. For services to Further Education.
- Samuel Gerard Hughes. For services to the Newry Credit Union Ltd and the ECCU Assurance Company Ltd.
- Thomas Joseph King, lately Deputy Principal, Department of the Environment, Northern Ireland Civil Service.
- Ann, Mrs McCann, Administrator, Community of the Peace People. For services to Peace in Northern Ireland.
- Hugh McClune. For services to the Northern Ireland Housing Executive.
- Maurice Noel McConkey. For services to the community, particularly the Disabled, in Northern Ireland.
- William John Murray, Chief Superintendent, Royal Ulster Constabulary.
- William John Nugent, Porter, Tower Hill Hospital, Armagh. For charitable services to the community in Armagh.
- Thomas Patrick Palmer, Cattle Mart Manager and Foreman. For services to Agriculture and to the Community in Co. Fermanagh, Northern Ireland.
- Susan, Mrs Patterson, Domestic Assistant, Musgrave Park Hospital, Belfast.
- Andrew George Scott, Constable, Royal Ulster Constabulary.
- Charles Gordon Watson, Sergeant, Royal Ulster Constabulary.
- William George Watson, lately Professional and Technology Officer, Department of the Environment, Northern Ireland Civil Service.
- Roland Brian Wright, Yarn Controller, Ulster Carpet Mills Holdings Ltd. For services to the Carpet Industry.

=== Queen's Police Medal (QPM) ===
- Samuel Hugh Gibson Power, Inspector, Royal Ulster Constabulary.
- Victor George Shaw, Superintendent, Royal Ulster Constabulary.

== Cook Islands ==
=== Order of the British Empire ===
==== Officer (OBE) ====
Civil division

- The Honourable Teanua Kamana. For services to the community.

=== British Empire Medal (BEM) ===
Civil division

- Mrs Taiti Marekino. For services to the community.

== Papua New Guinea ==
=== Knights Bachelor (Kt) ===
- Tumun Dupre, M.B.E. For local government and community service.
- The Honourable Albert Kipalan, M.P. For services to Politics and public services.
- Thomas Koraea, M.P. For public service.
- Leo Joseph Woo. For outstanding service to the community and commerce.

=== Order of St Michael and St George ===
==== Companion (CMG) ====
- The Honourable John Nilkare, M.P. For services to politics and commerce.

=== Order of the British Empire ===
==== Knight Commander (KBE) ====
Civil division

- Kina Bona. For public service.
- Charles Maino. For outstanding public service.

==== Commander (CBE) ====
Civil division

- Gai Duwabane. For services to politics.
- The Honourable Albert Karo, M.P. For services to politics and sport.

==== Officer (OBE) ====
Civil division

- David Robert Beatty. For public service.
- Xavier Justin Han. For service to the community and commerce.
- Arthur Llewellyn Jones. For services to agriculture and the coffee industry.
- Dr. The Rev. Sister Margaret (Taylor) Joseph. For outstanding services to medicine.
- Assistant Commissioner Robert Korus, Q.P.M. For outstanding services to the Royal Papua New Guinea Constabulary.
- Raphael Oimbari. For services to Papua New Guinea.
- Melly G. Paivu. For services to the community, tourism and local government.
- Peter Ipu Peipul. For public service.
- James Patrick Sinclair. For service to literature and to Papua New Guinea.
- Ellison Tokaivovo. For public service.
- Sam Tulo. For service to politics, public service and the community.

Military division

- Major Peter Ilau (86915), Papua New Guinea Defence Force.
- Major Frank Torova (87387), Papua New Guinea Defence Force.

==== Member (MBE) ====
Civil division

- Assistant Commissioner Graham Ainui, Q.P.M. For services to sport.
- Elenas Batari. For services to the law.
- Captain Aria Bouraga. For services to the airline industry.
- Eno Daera. For services to commerce.
- Inspector Margaret Garap. For outstanding services to the Papua New Guinea Correctional Service.
- Richard James Giddings. For outstanding services to Papua New Guinea as a Magistrate.
- Marcus Kawo. For outstanding services to politics and the community.
- Pastor Charles Nombo Lapa. For outstanding services to the Church and the community.
- Falema Larivetia. For public service.
- Dr. Christiaan Marjen. For services to medicine.
- Superintendent Napao Namane. For services to the Papua New Guinea Correctional Service.
- Major Tau Pala. For services to the Church and the community.
- Dr. Peter Pangatana. For services to medicine.
- Richard John Pickworth. For outstanding services to dentistry and the community.
- Robert Affleck Robertson. For services to sport and the community.
- Ainea Sengero. For public service.
- Douglas Gordon Sharpe. For outstanding services to the community and commerce.
- Captain Peter John Raymond Sharpe. For outstanding services to the airline industry.
- Malcolm Roy Smith, D.F.C. For services to the community and civil aviation.
- Pastor Jacob Sode. For services to the Church and the community.
- Julian Robert Thirlwall. For services to the legal profession and the community.

=== Imperial Service Order ===
==== Companion (ISO) ====
- Koiari Tarata. For public service.
- Kepas Isimel Watangia. For public service.

==== British Empire Medal (BEM) ====
Civil division

- Ulele Kathleen, Mrs. Agapie. For services to Government House.
- Miss Helen Billie. For services to the Royal Papua New Guinea Constabulary.
- Senior Constable Charles Boi. For services to the Royal Papua New Guinea Constabulary.
- Senior Constable Pirika Eafeare. For services to the Royal Papua New Guinea Constabulary.
- Babel Kiaprisi. For services to local government.
- Simeon Brian Mediwe. For services to Government House.
- Timon Ombiolu. For services to local government.
- Elisa Salot. For services to local government.
- Lance Corporal Sam Ingi Singa. For services to the Papua New Guinea Correctional Service.
- Constable Ben Theodore. For services to the Royal Papua New Guinea Constabulary.
- Senior Sergeant Epel ToBing. For services to the Royal Papua New Guinea Constabulary.
- Monika, Mrs. Tohaka. For services to education and women's affairs.

=== Queen's Police Medal (QPM) ===
- Chief Superintendent Sampson Esime Inguba. For services to the Royal Papua New Guinea Constabulary.
- Chief Superintendent Samson Mapi. For services to the Royal Papua New Guinea Constabulary.

=== Queen's Fire Service Medal (QFSM) ===
- Acting Chief Fire Officer Oswald Arisa. For services to the Papua New Guinea Fire Service.
- Acting Deputy Chief Fire Officer Roy Kurim. For services to the Papua New Guinea Fire Service.

== Bahamas ==
=== Order of St Michael and St George ===
==== Companion (CMG) ====
- Peter Ivan Bethel. For public service.

=== Order of the British Empire ===
==== Commander (CBE) ====
Civil division

- Basil Lawrence Ivan Johnson. For public service.

==== Officer (OBE) ====
Civil division

- Leviticus Louis Adderley. For community service to youth.
- The Reverend Canon Nehemiah Willrow Dudley Strachan. For religious leadership.
- Carl Granville Treco. For service to economic and social development.

==== Member (MBE) ====
Civil division

- Richard Brent Malone. For services to art.
- Thomas Augustus Robinson. For services to sports.
- John Berkley Taylor. For services to culture.
- Corrine Lorretta, Mrs. Patton-Thompson. For services to education and the community.
- Leopold Garth Wright, Sr. For political and social services.

=== British Empire Medal (BEM) ===
Civil division

- Miss Gwendolyn Hall. For services to education.
- Audley Theodore Humes. For community service.
- Captain Edgar Osband Moxey. For services to Family Island communities.

== Solomon Islands ==
=== Order of the British Empire ===
==== Officer (OBE) ====
Civil division

- Jonathan Wesley Kuka. For public and political services.

==== British Empire Medal (BEM) ====
Civil division

- Joel Hickson Donia. For public service.
- Atoia Ta'ake. For public services to agriculture.
- Michael Walerefoa. For services to nursing.

== Saint Lucia ==
=== Order of the British Empire ===
==== Officer (OBE) ====
Civil division

- Leslie Reginald Clarke. For public service.
- Johannes Leonce. For public service.

==== Member (MBE) ====
Civil division

- Josephine Serieux, Mrs. Rudolph. For voluntary community service.

== Grenada ==
=== Order of the British Empire ===
==== Member (MBE) ====
Civil division

- Claude Bartholomew, B.E.M. For services to the Veterans' Association.
- James Delcasse Campbell. For services to farming.
- Herbert Winston David James. For public service.

=== British Empire Medal (BEM) ===
Civil division

- Virginia, Mrs. Lord. For public service.
- Cuthbert Bernard Snagg. For community service.
