= Dorset & Wiltshire Fire and Rescue Service =

Emergency fire and rescue service in England

Operational area
- Country: England
- County: Dorset and Wiltshire
- Address: Five Rivers Health & Wellbeing Centre, Hulse Road, Salisbury, SP1 3NR

Agency overview
- Established: 1 April 2016
- Annual budget: £54.8 million (2016)
- Fire chief: Andy Cole
- Motto: "passionate about changing and saving lives"

Facilities and equipment
- Stations: 50

Website
- www.dwfire.org.uk

Dorset & Wiltshire Fire and Rescue Service is a statutory emergency fire and rescue service covering the local authority areas of Wiltshire, Swindon, Dorset and Bournemouth, Christchurch and Poole in England.

The service was created on 1 April 2016 by the merger of Dorset Fire and Rescue Service and Wiltshire Fire and Rescue Service. Its headquarters is at Salisbury, Wiltshire, some 10 miles (16 km) from the Dorset county boundary. The former headquarters at Poundbury, Dorset, and Potterne, Wiltshire, are retained as area offices; emergency calls for the combined area have been answered by the Service Control Centre since August 2015.

Provision of the service is by the Dorset & Wiltshire Fire and Rescue Authority, which has 18 elected members from all four constituent councils.

Andy Cole became the Chief Fire Officer in January 2025, replacing Ben Ansell.

== Stations ==
The service has 50 fire stations covering its area: six in the Bournemouth, Christchurch & Poole council areas, 20 in the rest of Dorset, three in Swindon, and 21 in the rest of Wiltshire.

The service uses a variety of duty systems including wholetime firefighters, retained firefighters (on-call), and day-duty. Some stations also have fire service co-responders, supporting the work of South Western Ambulance Service.

Other facilities include:

- Fire & Rescue Service Headquarters, Salisbury
- Devizes Training Centre
- West Moors Training Centre
- Support offices in Poundbury (behind the fire station)
- Equipment & fleet workshops in Charminster
- Equipment workshop in Trowbridge (behind the fire station)
- Fleet workshop in Bowerhill, Melksham

== Performance ==
Every fire and rescue service in England and Wales is subjected periodically to a statutory inspection by His Majesty's Inspectorate of Constabulary and Fire & Rescue Services (HMICFRS). The inspection investigates how well the service performs in each of three areas. On a scale of outstanding, good, requires improvement and inadequate, Dorset and Wiltshire Fire and Rescue Service has been rated as follows:

HMICFRS Inspection Dorset & Wiltshire
Area	Rating 2018/19	Rating 2021/22	Description
Effectiveness	Good	Good	How effective is the fire and rescue service at keeping people safe and secure from fire and other risks?
Efficiency	Good	Outstanding	How efficient is the fire and rescue service at keeping people safe and secure from fire and other risks?
People	Good	Good	How well does the fire and rescue service look after its people?

== Allegations ==
In January 2023, shortly after its latest HMICFRS inspection, ITV News made allegations against the service. It was alleged that some firefighters had taken candid pictures of dead female road traffic incident victims and shared them on a private WhatsApp group, where demeaning comments were made, including some about the dead women's underwear. As a result of the allegations, the service reported itself to Dorset Police. A thorough investigation was carried out but no evidence was found to support the allegations.

In addition, ITN made claims of sexist behaviour by male officers and firefighters against a number of female firefighters. In February 2023, the service revealed that in May 2022, before the ITV News investigation, the service's assistant chief fire officer was investigated for sexual misconduct by its disciplinary committee. However, he retired before being subject to summary dismissal for gross misconduct. The chief fire officer commissioned an independent review of the service culture. The review was published in October 2023.

== See also ==
- Fire services in the United Kingdom
- List of British firefighters killed in the line of duty
