= Bob McKinlay (engineer) =

Scottish businessman (born 1934)

Robert Murray McKinlay CBE FREng FRAeS (born 12 January 1934) is a Scottish businessman, a former chief executive of British Aerospace.

== Early life ==
He is the son of Robert Graham McKinlay and Mary Murray. He attended school in West Dunbartonshire, then studied at the Royal College of Science and Technology in Glasgow.

== Career ==
=== BAC ===
Concorde air intake ramp and nozzle configuration

McKinlay worked from 1966 for the British Aircraft Corporation, becoming Concorde's systems development manager. In 1968 he became assistant chief engineer on Concorde. He was responsible for the digital control of Concorde's air intake for the Olympus 593. Testing for Concorde's air intake ramp could not take place at RAF Fairford and had to take place with Concorde 101 (F-BTSC) at Tangier Ibn Battouta Airport, as the air intake had to be tested at high altitude. Concorde was the first aircraft to have digital control of its air intake system.

From 1976 he was the Design Director of Concorde, and was responsible for getting Concorde to start flying from airports, and how to reduce the noise of the engines.

=== British Aerospace ===
McKinlay worked for British Aerospace at Bristol Filton Airport until 1994. He became the Managing Director of its civil aircraft division in April 1990. In May 1990, British Aerospace announced that it would build a successor to Concorde. Syd Gillibrand was chairman of British Aerospace's aircraft division; John Weston was managing director of the military aircraft division in Lancashire (now BAE Systems Military Air & Information). In December 1991, British Aerospace moved its aircraft division structure, with Mike Turner becoming responsible for regional and corporate aircraft. In February 1992, British Aerospace split its civil aircraft division in three divisions, with British Aerospace Regional Aircraft and British Aerospace Corporate Jets.

He took part in the 2005 documentary Supersonic Dream for PBS. British Aerospace left the commercial aircraft market in 2001.

== Personal life ==
McKinlay married Ellen Stewart in 1957; they have two sons. He was awarded the CBE in the 1993 Birthday Honours. He became a Fellow of the Royal Academy of Engineering in 1992 and was awarded the British Gold Medal of the Royal Aeronautical Society in 1995.

Business positions
Preceded by	Managing Director of British Aerospace (Commercial Aircraft); April 1990 - December 1991	Succeeded by
