= Enfield-chantry school =

Chantry school in Enfield, London, England

Enfield-chantry school was a chantry school in Enfield from c. 1398–1558, and the predecessor of Enfield Grammar School.

== History ==
In the reign of Richard II (1377–1399) a king's licence was awarded to Baldwin de Radyngton in 1398 to found a chantry in Enfield at St Andrews parish church, endowed with lands to the value of £10 per annum. Part of this endowment consisted of lands in Enfield and Radington Bridge.

Robert Blossom of South Benfleet, Essex, who died in 1418 (in the time of Henry V, 1413–22), left his estate called Poynetts to support a chantry at South Benfleet for three years. His widow Agnes came to reside at Enfield and remarried, and the estate was put into Trust, with Lord Tiptoft as Trustee. After Agnes died, her second husband, John Hulfield, remarried, and when he died his widow married William Daubeney. In 1455 Lord Tiptoft conveyed the Trust to him. Within two years it had passed to one Richard Ingleton, and in 1471 he received a licence from Edward IV to endow a chantry at Enfield church with proceeds from the same estate, to the value of 10 marks. It is recorded that there was a schoolmaster at Enfield before 1524, since one is mentioned in connection with the funeral in that year of Sir Thomas Lovell of Elsing. It is most likely that this man was educating boys as part of the work of the chantry.

Following the dissolution of Chantries in the first year of Edward VI, the Blossom's Chantry endowment lands were taken by the Court of Augmentations for the Crown and sold, with many other lands: but in 1550 the money was repaid to the purchasers and the lands recovered by the Court, on the grounds that the King's title in them was not secure. In 1553 Queen Mary I relinquished the Crown interest in them. In January 1558, at the first, uncompleted attempt to found the Enfield Free Grammar School, the whole estates were granted or intended to be conveyed for the endowment of the new school. One of the Trustees having died soon afterwards, before that deed could be completed, a second foundation deed was drawn up in May 1558, by which only a part of the rents from these estates was granted towards the school, the remainder of the proceeds being assigned to the poor of Enfield.

The amount granted in May 1558, £6 13s. 4d. (equivalent to 10 marks), was the same sum which had formerly been paid as the stipend of the chantry priest. An older school-house certainly still existed east of the churchyard in 1572. It therefore appears likely that this had been used for the chantry-school, and that its reformed activities were continued there under the new Grammar School foundation and endowment until new buildings were constructed under the William Garrett bequest of 1586.
