= Enfield Grammar School =

Location
- Market Place; Enfield, London, EN2 6LN; England; 51°39′11″N 0°04′59″W

Information
- Type: Academy
- Motto: Tant Que Je Puis (As Much As I Can)
- Established: 1558; 468 years ago (incorporating earlier foundation approx. 1398–1418)
- Founder: Trustees of Poynants, (or Poynetts)
- Local authority: London Borough of Enfield
- Department for Education URN: 137094 Tables
- Ofsted: Reports
- Headmaster: Christopher Lamb
- Gender: Boys (6th form mixed)
- Age: 11 to 18
- Enrolment: 920~
- Houses: Forty -F; Myddelton -M; Poynetts -P; Raleigh -R; St. Andrew's -S; Uvedale -U
- Colours: Black, Red and White
- Website: www.enfieldgrammar.com

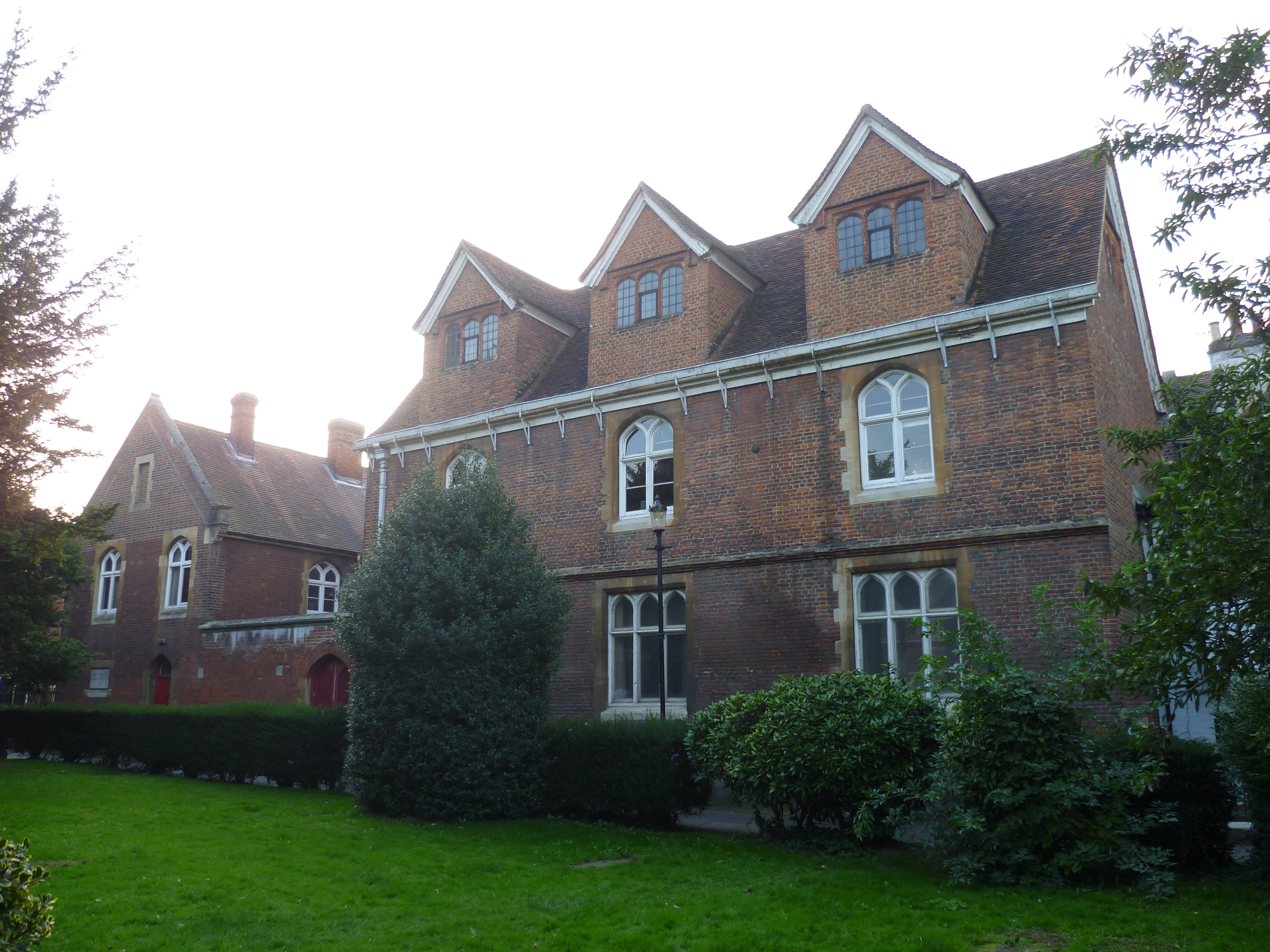
The old Enfield Grammar School building.

Enfield Grammar School (abbreviated to EGS; also known as Enfield Grammar) is a boys' comprehensive school and sixth form with academy status in Enfield Town in the London Borough of Enfield in North London. The school was founded in 1558 and inherited part of a charitable endowment that had endowed the earlier Enfield chantry-school. In 1967, the school was amalgamated with Chace Boys School to form a comprehensive school. The two schools were separated again in 1970. In 2023, the school started to accept female applications, for 6th form, for the first time in the school’s 500 year history.

== History ==
Enfield Grammar School was founded on 25 May 1558. The school's first known schoolmaster was William Bradshawe, who was in post until 1600.

At its foundation, the school inherited part of a charitable endowment. This property had endowed the earlier Enfield chantry-school which preceded and was incorporated into the Grammar School. As Dr. Birkett Marshall points out, there is evidence a schoolmaster existed in Enfield prior to 1524, based on an account of the funeral of a Sir Thomas Lovell. An older school-house that certainly still existed east of the churchyard in 1572 seems likely to have housed the grammar school established in 1558 until the erection in the 1580s of the Tudor building sometimes referred to as the Old Hall. This was built on the grounds adjacent to Prounces house, bought by the parish in 1516 and originally occupied by John Prouns in 1399. The Tudor school building is still currently in use. There were reportedly boarders in this building for part of its history, as reputedly there were much later at Enfield Court (the Lower School).

On the dissolution of the chantries in 1547 the rights to the charitable property passed to the Crown. However, the Court of Augmentations questioned and challenged the King's title so that in 1550 the property was restored. In 1553 Queen Mary I relinquished all claims and in 1558 an attempt was made to endow a school with the Poynetts estate. Unfortunately, a proposed trustee died before the execution of the deed, which meant a second deed granted only £6 13s. 4d. just sufficient for the salary of the former chantry priest who established a school, the remainder being used for the relief of the poor. Thus from 1558, a schoolmaster began teaching the children of Enfield's poor Latin and English 'according to the trade and use of grammar schools'. In 1586 William Garrett left £50 to build a schoolhouse, and this money is presumed to have been used to erect the Tudor building which is still in use and stands adjacent to the west of St. Andrew's Church.

In 1623, when the Prounces estate property was settled in trust, Prounces house became the schoolmaster's residence. One headmaster, Robert Uvedale, while continuing in his post at EGS much to the consternation of the trustees and some parishioners opened another rival private (fee-paying) boarding-school, the Palace School, in about 1660, which survived until 1896.

In 1967, it was amalgamated with Chace Boys School to form a comprehensive school that retained the name Enfield Grammar School. The two schools were separated again in 1970. Chace Boys School has since become co-educational and has changed its name to Chace Community School.

In 2023, the school started to accept female applications for its 6th form; the first time in the school’s 500 year history.

== Academic performance and inspections ==
In 2023, the school's Progress 8 benchmark was average. 47% of pupils were entered for the English Baccalaureate, compared to 57% in Enfield as a whole and 39% nationally. 51% of pupils achieved Grade 5 or above in English and maths GCSEs, compared to 49% in Enfield as a whole and 45% nationally. The school's Attainment 8 result was 49, compared to 47 in Enfield and 46 nationally.

At A-level, in 2023 the school's average result was C+, compared to B− in Enfield and B nationally.

In 2014, the school was inspected by Ofsted and judged Good.

As of 2023, the school's most recent inspection by Ofsted was in 2018, with a judgement of Good.

== Location ==
The upper school buildings are next to the Enfield Town Market Place and St. Andrew's Church, and have been extended several times since 1586. A new hall and further extensions were completed shortly before World War II.

Originally Enfield Town where the school is situated was of some historical significance, being near Edward VI's palace where Elizabeth I lived for a while a princess, including during the final illness of Henry VIII. Edward was taken there to join her, so that in the company of his sister Edward Seymour, 1st Earl of Hertford, could break the news to Edward, formally announcing the death of their royal father in the presence chamber at Enfield, on his knees to make formal obeisance to the boy as King. Later Elizabeth held court there when she was queen (this was remembered in the name Palace Gardens that was a street running behind Pearsons department store and is still recalled in the name of Enfield's shopping centre). In 1924, Enfield Court in Baker Street was purchased to accommodate the lower school. For some years, the first year pupils of the grammar school shared it with the first year pupils of Enfield County School, but it is now used for Enfield Grammar School students in years 7 and 8, and its former gardens provide the school with playing fields. The Enfield Loop of the New River passes through the playing fields, and this is the only stretch of the loop without a public footpath on at least one side of it.

== Motto ==
The school motto, which is incorporated in the school badge is 'Tant Que Je Puis', which is Old French, and means 'As much as I can'. It was taken from the Uvedale family because Dr. Robert Uvedale was master from 1664 to 1676.

== Admissions ==
The school has an intake of 180 boys a year. Initial admittance to the school is made via the Local Authority admissions process and is not selective, except that up to 18 pupils (10% of the annual intake) are admitted under Sport & Music Scholarships.

There is separate admission into the Sixth Form, which accepts up to 140 students a year. This is based on pupils' GCSE results.

== Notable alumni ==
- Derek Austin, librarian; author; developer of innovative digital cataloguing systems
- Mason Caton-Brown, Rugby League, Represented England Students and London Broncos. Currently plays for the Salford City Reds
- Bob Cobbing, sound, visual, concrete and performance poet
- John Coote, (1936–2017) Professor of Physiology at the University of Birmingham
- Jim Crace, prize-winning English novelist, a former journalist
- Michael Duberry, footballer
- Vernon Handley, conductor
- Alan Hopes, Auxiliary Bishop of Westminster, Roman Catholic bishop
- Jack Howe, architect and industrial designer
- Christopher Hughes, quiz champion
- David Hutton, footballer
- Hugh Jenkins, later Baron Jenkins of Putney, Labour politician, campaigner and member of Parliament and of the House of Lords
- Frederic Wood Jones (1879–1954), anatomist, naturalist and anthropologist
- Sir Peter Large, Shell executive until 1962, disabled by polio; subsequently civil servant; disability campaigner; founded Association of Disabled Professionals, parliamentary adviser; 2004 lifetime achievement award from the Royal Association for Disability and Rehabilitation. 16 October 1931 – 13 January 2005, aged 73.
- Brian Launder, Professor of Mechanical Engineering
- Norman Lewis, author, travel writer
- Terry Lightfoot, jazz clarinettist and bandleader
- Jake Livermore, England footballer
- Ryan Mason, England footballer
- Sir Alec Merrison, physicist
- Colin Metson, first class cricketer for Middlesex and Glamorgan
- Robin Millar, record producer, musician and businessman
- Steve Morison, Wales footballer
- Romaine Mundle, footballer
- Walter Pater, nineteenth-century essayist, critic
- Trevor Peacock, actor best known for playing Jim Trott in the BBC comedy series The Vicar of Dibley
- Daniel Phillips, Trinidad and Tobago footballer
- John Francis Picard, jazz musician
- Oliver G Pike, pioneering wildlife photographer
- William Pratt, actor, aka Boris Karloff
- Michael J. Smith, cricketer
- Kevin Stewart, Jamaica footballer
- Mark Tami, politician
- Derek Taunt, mathematician and Bletchley Park codebreaker
- Philip Tew, professor of literature and novelist
- Andrew Turnbull, Baron Turnbull, former head of the British Civil Service and Cabinet Secretary; life peer as Baron Turnbull, of Enfield, on 11 October 2005

== Bibliography ==
- A Short History of the Enfield Grammar School by Samuel Smith, 1932
- A Brief History of Enfield Grammar School 1558-1958 by Leslie Birkett Marshall, 1958
- J.S. Cockburn, H.P.F. King, K.G.T. McDonnell (Editors) Private Education from the Sixteenth Century: Developments from the 16th to the early 19th century (1969), pp. 241–255. Accessed 5 October 2007.
- A detailed history of Enfield Grammar School at British History Online
- 'Schools: Enfield Grammar School', in A History of the County of Middlesex: Volume 1, Private Education From Sixteenth Century, ed. J S Cockburn, H P F King, K G T McDonnell (London, 1969), pp. 294-296. Accessed 10 July 2025.

== See also ==
- List of schools in Enfield
- London Borough of Enfield
- Grammar schools in the United Kingdom
