= Jack Howe (architect) =

British architect (1911–2003)

Jack Howe (24 February 1911 – 3 December 2003) was an architect and industrial designer who worked on Impington Village College as an architect and the Chubb cash dispenser MD2 as an industrial designer.

== Early life ==
Howe was born in Enfield, Middlesex on 24 February 1911, and was a butcher's son. He attended Enfield Grammar School and studied architecture at the Regent Street Polytechnic.

== Architecture career ==
Howe worked for Joseph Emberton, and from 1934 onwards for Maxwell Fry, where he worked on Impington Village College and the Westminster Electricity Showroom in Regent Street. Following Walter Gropius's move to the United States in 1937, Howe oversaw the construction of Impington Village College. At the outbreak of the World War II, he worked with Holland, Hannen & Cubitts for the Royal Ordnance factories at Wrexham and Ranskill. He then joined Arcon in 1944 as associate partner, and worked on the design of the Mark 4 prefabricated house, of which 41,000 were later built. He set up his own practice after the end of the war, and designed Highbury Quadrant Primary School and housing at Windmill House, Lambeth, among other buildings, for the London County Council. He worked on the Kodak pavilion at the Brussels World Fair in 1958 and the British Pavilion at the British Trade Fair in Moscow in 1961.

== Industrial design career ==
Howe had his first industrial design commission in 1946 from Gent & Co Ltd., and moved gradually into industrial design from the 1950s onwards. Among his clients were Chubb, for whom he designed the Chubb cash dispenser MD2, which won him the 1969 Duke of Edinburgh's Prize for Elegant Design, Associated Electrical Industries, Thermos, Morphy Richards and Heals.
