= Charles Notcutt =

British horticulturalist and businessman (1934–2015)

Charles Roger Macpherson Notcutt
- Born: 30 May 1934
- Died: 1 July 2015 (aged 81)
- Occupation: Businessman

Charles Roger Macpherson Notcutt OBE VMH (30 May 1934 – 1 July 2015) was a horticulturalist and businessman. The Scotsman, in its obituary, said that Notcutt was "an inspirational and popular leader of the horticultural community, establishing and developing many trade bodies, as well as education and research in the field."

== Business career ==
In 1958, he began working at his family's garden business, later known as Notcutts Garden Centres. The Daily Telegraph wrote in its obituary that Notcutt "transformed it into Britain’s largest family owned garden centre group with 19 centres around the country.".

== Political career ==
Notcutt was elected to the Woodbridge, Suffolk Town Council in 2009. He was the mayor of Woodbridge from 2012 to 2013.

== Awards ==
- Order of the British Empire
- Victoria Medal of Honour from the Royal Horticultural Society
