= Malcolm Kela Smith =

Papua New Guinea politician (1943–2021)

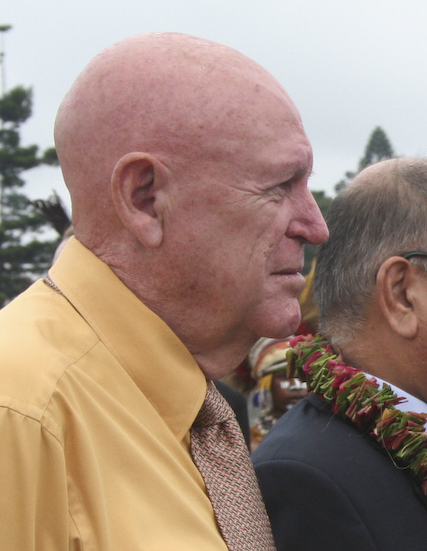
Smith in 2009

Malcolm Roy "Kela" Smith CMG MBE DFC (10 April 1943 – 5 April 2021) was a businessman, aviator and politician in Papua New Guinea.

== Biography ==
Smith was born in London, England in 1943, and emigrated to Australia as a child. He joined the Australian Army Aviation corps, and served as a pilot with the 161st Independent Reconnaissance Flight in the Vietnam War for which he was awarded the Distinguished Flying Cross. In 1969, Smith was posted to Papua New Guinea where he remained permanently, founding the aviation company Pacific Helicopters PNG and owning a shopping centre and hotel in Goroka.

Smith was appointed a Member of the Order of the British Empire (MBE) in the 1993 Birthday Honours for services to the community and civil aviation, and a Companion of the Order of St Michael and St George (CMG) in the 2006 Birthday Honours for services to primary industry and the environment.

He served as the governor of Eastern Highlands Province from 2002 to 2012. Smith also served as a member of the National Parliament of Papua New Guinea for the United Resources Party from 2003 to 2012. He died at age 77 from complications of COVID-19 while under treatment in the intensive care unit at Redcliffe Hospital in Queensland, Australia.

Political offices
Preceded by Peti Lafanama	Governor of Eastern Highlands Province; 2002–2012	Succeeded by Julie Soso
