= Kina Bona =

Judge of the Supreme Court of Papua New Guinea

Sir Kina Bona, KBE is a judge of the Supreme Court of Papua New Guinea. He is a former president of the Papua New Guinea Law Society.

== Honours ==
In 1993, Bona was made a Knight Commander of the Order of the British Empire Queen Elizabeth II in the 1993 Birthday Honours for public service.
