= Peter Large =

British disability rights campaigner (1931–2005)

Sir Peter Large (16 October 1931 - 23 January 2005) was a British disability rights campaigner.

== Early life ==
Large was born 16h October 1931 in Tynemouth, North East England, to Rosslyn Victor Large, a bank clerk, and Ethel May Large (née Walters). However, at registration his parents' address was 34 Chase Court Gardens, Enfield, London.

He attended Enfield Grammar School from 1943 to 1950, before reading civil engineering at UCL, obtaining a BSc in 1953. During this time, he had a trial with Arsenal, but did not pursue a professional footballing career. He went on to national service in the Royal Navy, before joining Shell International as an engineer in 1956. During his time with Shell, Large worked in Nigeria, Ghana, the Persian Gulf and Indonesia.

However, in 1962, Large contracted polio while working in Indonesia and spent three years in hospital. He was wheelchair-bound for the rest of his life. Despite this, by 1966 he was able to return to work as a civil servant at the Ministry of Technology, and later at the Department of Trade and Industry. Large became a senior scientific officer in February 1976, retiring in 1991.

== Disability campaigning ==
While working as a civil servant, Large helped write parts of the Chronically Sick and Disabled Persons Act 1970 and the Social Security Benefits Bill 1974.

In 1968, Large was invited to join the Joint Committee on Mobility for the Disabled by the founding chairman, Denny Denly. Large became chairman in 1971, continuing until 1997, when he became president from 1997 to 2005. He was also chairman of the Association of Disabled Professionals from 1971 to 1993 and on the executive committee of Radar from 1977 to 2001, serving as vice-chairman from 1995 to 1999.

From 1973 to 1993, Large was parliamentary advisor to the Disability Income Group and in 1977 he chaired the Silver Jubilee Access Committee, publishing a report titled "Can Disabled People Go Where You Go?". In 1978, he was appointed by minister for disabled people Alf Morris to lead an inquiry into disability discrimination in the UK.

In 1988, Large worked with Nicholas Scott, the then Minister for Social Security, to set up the Independent Living Fund, designed to give disabled people the funding necessary to live independently.

Large was made MBE in 1974, CBE in 1987 and knighted in 1993. He received the Harding Award in 1992 and a lifetime achievement award from Radar in December 2004.

== Personal life ==
Large married his first wife, Susy Baber (Note: Listed in the Telegraph as Susy Fisher. This was her original maiden name, with Baber the name of her first husband.), on 27th April 1962. They had a son, George, and two daughters, Anne and Julia. Following Susy's death from kidney failure in 1982, Large married Sheenah McCaffrey on 16th October 1992, acquiring three stepchildren.

Large died at home in Warlingham, Surrey, on 23rd January 2005 2005, aged 73.
