= Bertie Coxall =

Herbert Colin Coxall OBE (16 January 1924 – 1993) known as Bertie Coxall, was recognized for his unique contribution to the development of the courier and the express industries.

In 1966, he set up one of the world's first air courier companies. He was also instrumental in founding the Association of International Courier and Express Services (AICES) and later the Association of European Express Carriers. Through this and his membership in the International Express Carriers Conference (IECC), he worked steadfastly to dispel the 'cowboy' image of the courier industry and promote it as a respected worldwide. He was recognized as an expert on the complexities of international customs procedures for express shipments and worked tirelessly to achieve parity of treatment with postal administrations. Additionally, he contributed valuable input to the European Commission in formulating its Paper on Community Postal Policy, ensuring that it was aware of the courier industry's interests. This helpfully reinforced the line which the Department of Trade and Industry took with the Commission.

Having left school in 1941, Bertie Coxall joined the RAF and was commissioned as a navigator, serving in Canada and the Middle East. Upon demobilization in 1947 he joined LEP as a Customs Entry Clerk and remained there for 20 years, through LEP's takeover first by American Airlines and then by Pan American Airways (Pan Am), rising to managerial level. In 1966, finding he could not progress in Pan Am without emigrating to the United States, he resigned to form his own company, Airport Courier Services Ltd (ACSL), providing document transmission by motorcycle within the Heathrow area between freight agents and airlines. In 1969, he expanded operations by sending an employee daily to Paris and back. This innovative air courier service was gradually extended to other destinations across the world.

Relaxation of the postal monopoly for time-sensitive items in 1981 brought the rapid expansion of the courier industry. Realizing that an independent company could not compete with the giants, he sold ACSL to Securicor in 1982. He then continued as its Managing Director under a 5-year contract. He remained a Non-Executive Director of Securicor Omega Express (formerly Securicor Express International) and that consultant role enabled him to give more time to the courier industry as a whole. He was a member of the IECC's Executive Committee since its formation in 1984 and in 1989 he became inaugural Chairman of the Association of European Express Carriers (AEEC). Having served twice as the chairman of the Association of Courier and Express Services (AICES), he was elected Honorary Life-President in 1985 in recognition of his work for the Association and for the courier industry as a whole.
