= Dorset Fire and Rescue Service =

Fire service in the United Kingdom

Operational area
- Country: England
- County: Dorset

Agency overview
- Established: 1941 – 2016
- Employees: 826
- Chief Fire Officer: Darran Gunter

Facilities and equipment
- Stations: 26

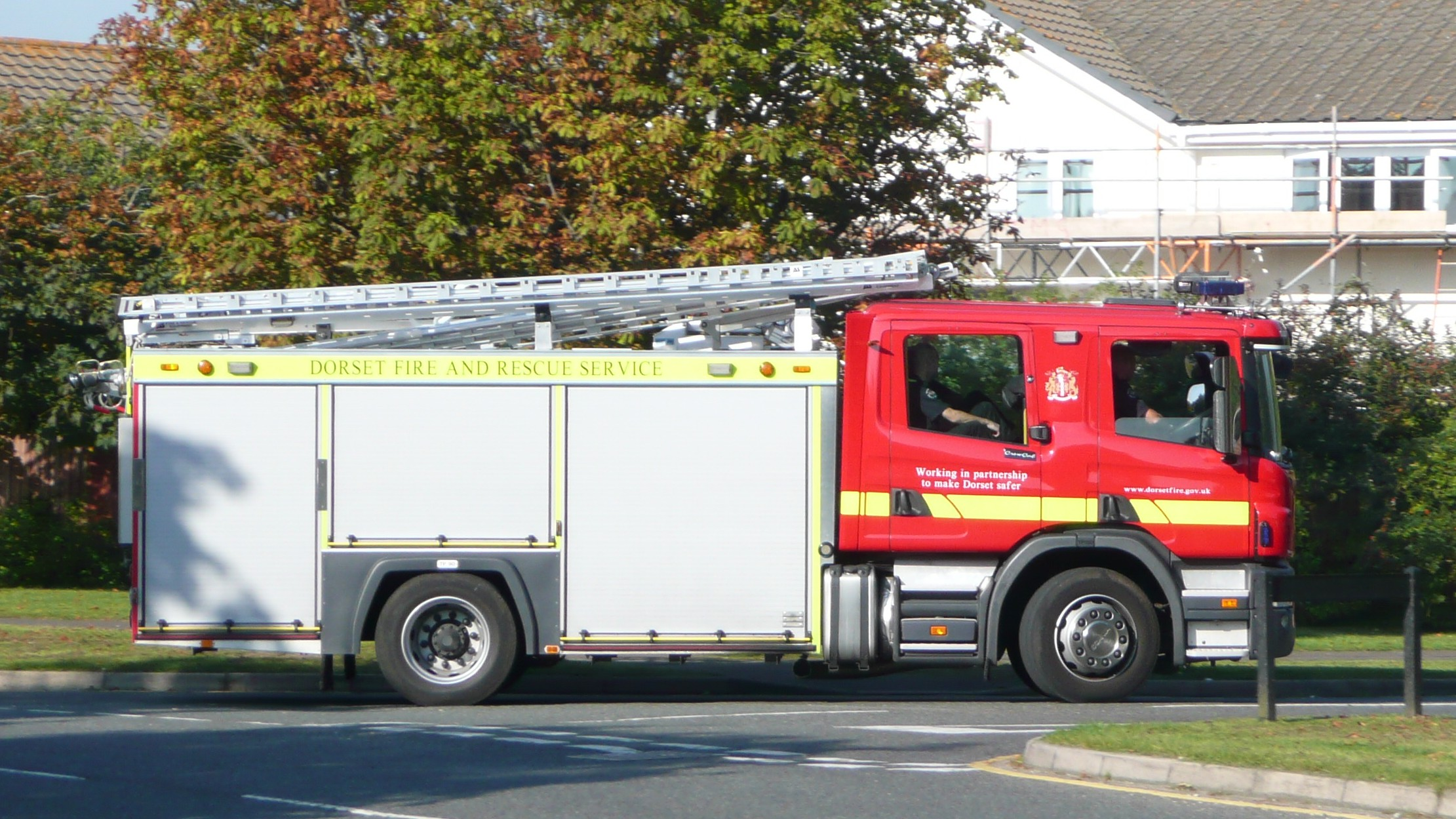
A Scania built fire engine of the Dorset service.

Dorset Fire and Rescue Service is the former statutory Fire and Rescue Service for the area of Dorset, South West England. The Service Headquarters were located in Colliton Park, Dorchester, but as of October 2008 moved to a new purpose built location in Poundbury.

With effect from April 2016, the fire services of Dorset and Wiltshire were merged into the Dorset and Wiltshire Fire and Rescue Service.

== History ==
Dorset County Fire Brigade was formed by mainly volunteer brigades, falling within the responsibility of Dorset County Council. Fire Brigades were nationalised during the Second World War and returned to the responsibility of County Councils on 1 April 1948. Between 1948 and 1974, Dorset Fire Brigade had eighteen part-time stations and three full-time stations. On 1 April 1974 the administrative area of Dorset County Council was increased to include Bournemouth and Christchurch (previously within the county of Hampshire) and with it the area of the County Fire Brigade.

On 1 April 1997, as a result of local government reorganisation, two new Unitary Authorities were created in the county of Dorset: Bournemouth Borough and the Borough of Poole. Consequently, a new Combined Fire Authority (comprising the residual County Council, Bournemouth Council and Poole Council) became responsible for the service, which was renamed to Dorset Fire and Rescue Service.

As part of the FiReControl project, Dorset Fire and Rescue's control room was planned to switch over to the regional control centre in Taunton. Originally scheduled to take place in March 2010, the cutover date was revised to July 2011, however the plan was scrapped in December 2010.

== See also ==
- Fire services in the United Kingdom
