= Pre-school Learning Alliance =

The Pre-school Learning Alliance (PLA) is an early-years educational registered charity and a voluntary sector provider of childcare for young children in England.

== Introduction ==
The Pre-school Learning Alliance (the Alliance) is the largest early years membership organisation and voluntary sector provider of quality affordable childcare and education in England. An educational charity, the Alliance represents the interests of over 14,000 member settings who deliver care and learning to over 800,000 families every year.

The Alliance employs over 2,000 national and local staff and is supported by more than 750 volunteers every year. They directly contribute towards the care and well-being of very young children and their families in England.

A registered charity, the Alliance was established by parent volunteers in 1961 and has grown significantly since then.

The Alliance believes that children learn best through play and first-hand child-led experiences, involving exploration and discovery, which encourage their development and learning.

Families are involved in every aspect of service planning and delivery and they encourage parental involvement through consultation, parent-led fundraising events, open days, outings and family learning.

== Early days ==
In 1961 a reader of the Manchester Guardian, Belle Tutaev, pointed out the inadequacy of state-provided nursery education in the UK. She set up her own playgroup by co-operating with a neighbour. Her suggested Nursery School Campaign resulted the formation of the Pre-School Playgroups Association (PPA) on 16 July 1962.

The PPA received a grant that year from the Nuffield Foundation, and in 1966 from the Department of Education and Science, at which point 600 groups were affiliated. The Plowden Report of 1967 recognised the value of playgroups.

== The PLA ==
A change of name to Pre-school Learning Alliance occurred in 1995, and followed organisational changes. A further more recent change of name to Early Years Alliance has since taken place.
