= Notcutts =

English garden centre chain

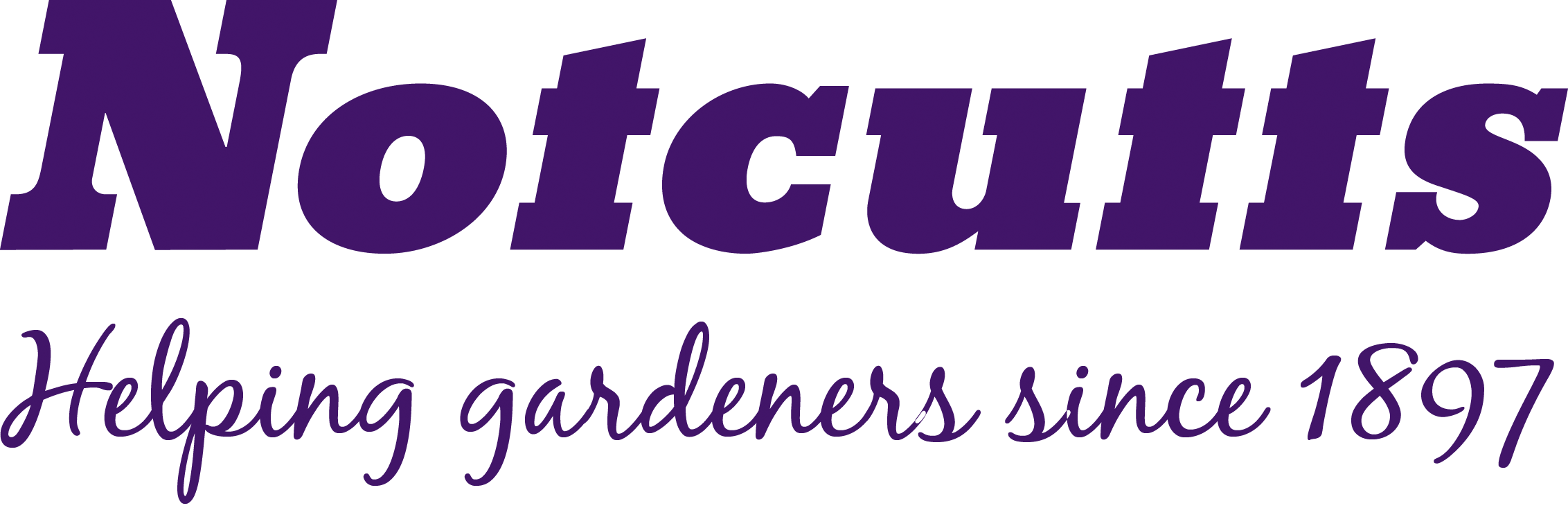
- Type: Private Limited
- Industry: Retail
- Founded: Ipswich (1897)
- Headquarters: Woodbridge
- Products: Furniture; Plants; Pets; Gifts
- Number of employees: Around 1500
- Website: www.notcutts.co.uk

Notcutts Garden Centres Ltd. is a private limited company. The family-owned group operates 19 individual garden centres across England. Notcutts also owns one of the UK's largest rose specialists (Mattocks).

Notcutts was founded in Woodbridge, Suffolk, in 1897, and remains a family-owned business. Their first retail garden centre was set up in Woodbridge. Products from Notcutts range from plants to furniture and most Notcutts stores across England include departments such as planteria, indoor and outdoor furniture, indoor plants, pets and a restaurant area. The Notcutts garden centres also have indoor shops which sell household products and other gifts.

== History ==
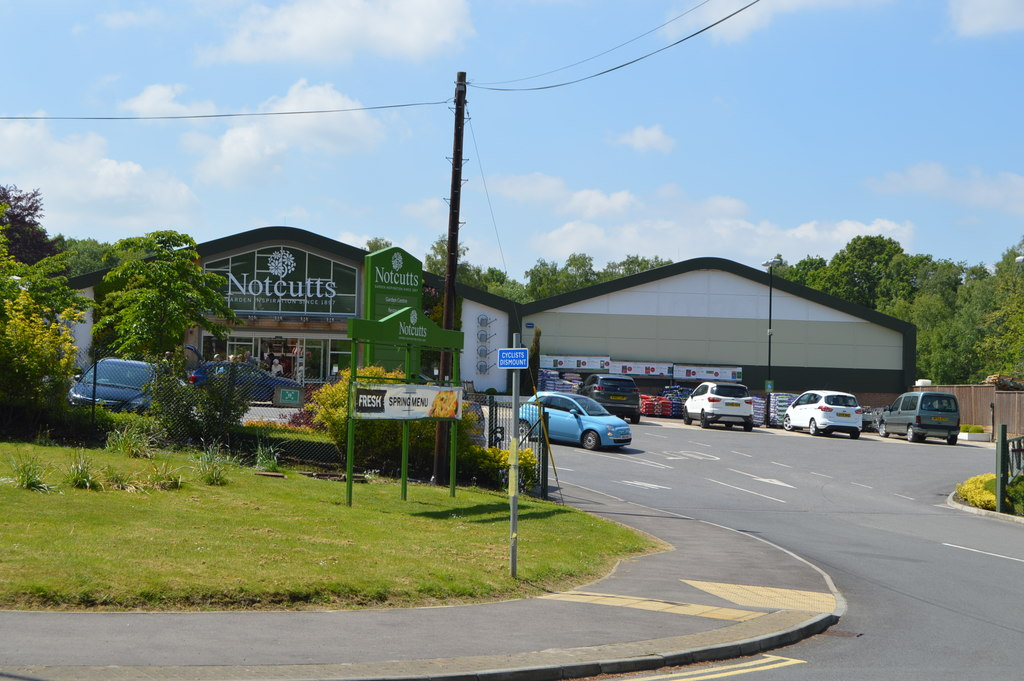
Entrance to centre at Pembury, Kent

The Notcutts Garden Centres head office stands on land which was originally owned by Woodbridge Priory, dissolved by Henry VIII. The grounds were purchased from the Crown by Thomas Seckford, the Woodbridge benefactor and then passed into the hands of the Carthew family. A nurseryman called Thomas Wood purchased the land in 1749 and started Woods Nursery. Thomas Wood passed the nursery to his sons, and eventually it came to John Wood, thus remaining within the Wood family for almost 150 years. Wood died without succession in 1897. The nursery with its fine, old Georgian house, was put up for auction on 11 February 1897.

William Notcutt moved from Wrington in Somerset to Ipswich in 1724, as a pastor, bringing the Notcutt name to Suffolk. The first Notcutt family member to enter into the horticultural field was Roger Crompton Notcutt (later known as RCN) who was born in 1869. Unlike his predecessors, he was not burdened by obligations to enter the legal practice. It was recommended that, due to ill health, he should pursue an out-door life. Fortunately, he also had a keen interest in nature, particularly in the growing of plants. This was an interest he was able to pursue when in his teens, he acquired the Broughton Road Nursery in Ipswich.

In August 2007, 110 years after purchasing the nursery business from the estate of John Woods, the Notcutt family decided to sell the nursery side of the business to the management team of the nursery and so started a new phase in the history of the nursery.

== Exihibition ==
Notcutts exhibited at horticultural shows including Chelsea Flower Show, Hampton Court, Gardeners' World and the Suffolk Show, until 2008. At RHS Chelsea the company won fifty gold medals. Now the business focuses solely on its eighteen garden centres across the UK as well as its online presence.
