= Cellini (disambiguation) =

Benvenuto Cellini (1500–1571) was an Italian goldsmith, painter, sculptor, soldier and musician of the Renaissance.

Cellini may also refer to:

- Cellini (play), a 2001 play by John Patrick Shanley
- Cellini (surname)
- Cellini (horse)
- Cellini (apple), see Laxton's Superb
