= Laxton's Superb =

Apple cultivar

'Laxton's Superb' apple
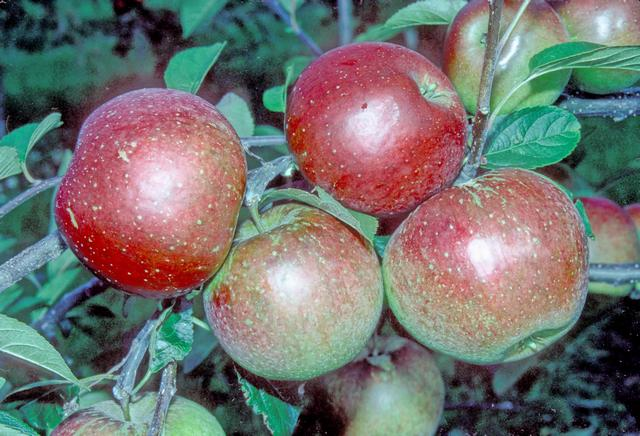
- Genus: Malus
- Species: Malus domestica
- Hybrid parentage: 'Cellini' × 'Cox's Orange Pippin'
- Cultivar: 'Laxton's Superb'
- Origin: Laxton Brothers; England, Bedford, 1897

The 'Laxton's Superb' is an apple cultivar that was developed in England in 1897. It is a cross breed between 'Cellini' and 'Cox's Orange Pippin'. It is a British apple with a green color and a dull red flush. It is a firm-textured dessert apple. The fruit is well known for its sweet and aromatic taste, which is likened to the parent cultivar it is derived from, the 'Cox's Orange Pippin'.

- S genotype S5 S16b
- Density 0.80-0.82 g/cc
- Sugar 14.0%
- Acid 7.4 g/litre.
- Vitamin C 5-9mg/100g.

Typical size distribution
55-60 mm	60-65 mm	65-70 mm	70-75 mm	75-80 mm
7 %	15 %	28 %	42 %	8 %

== History ==
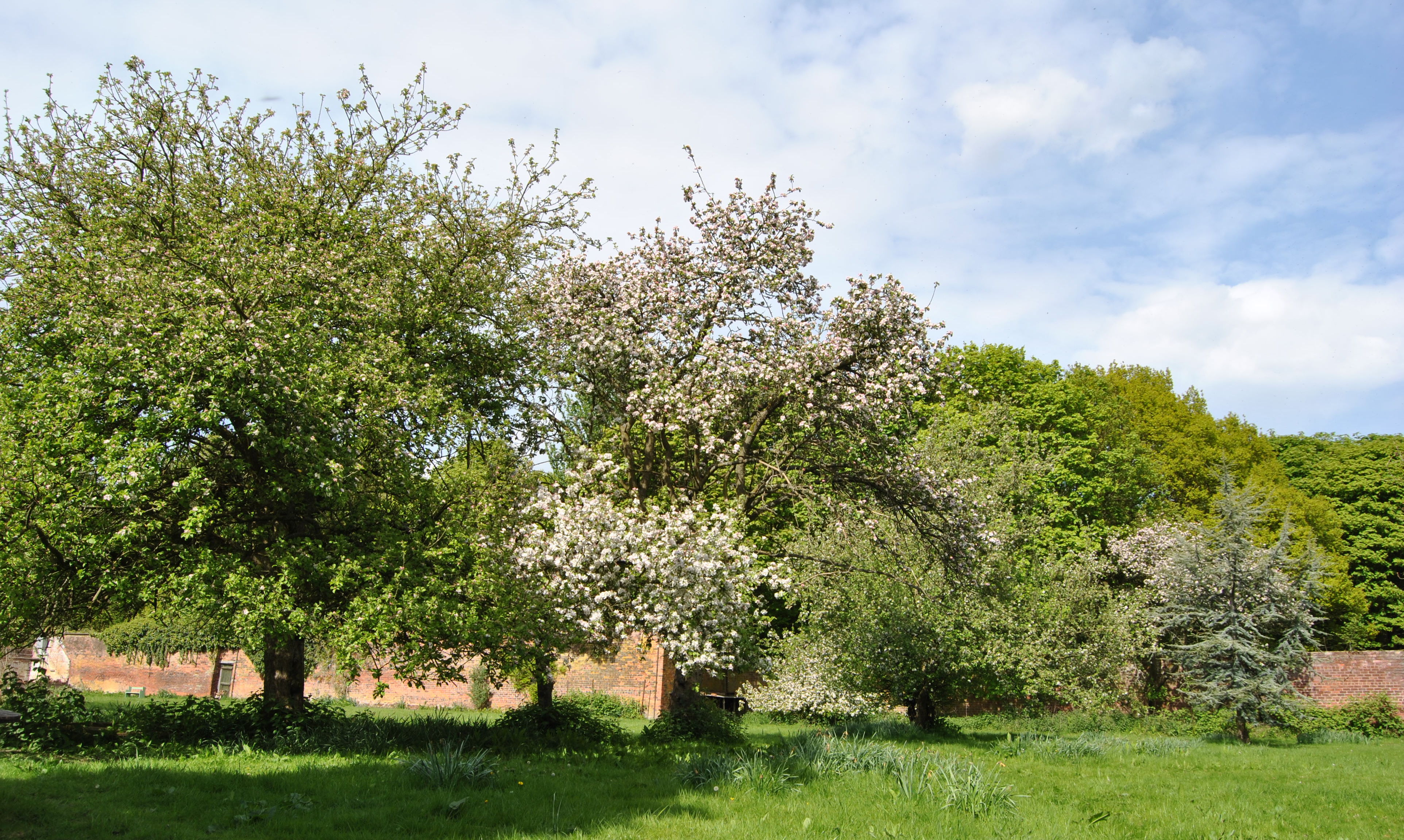
Apple Trees at Bank Hall, Bretherton, the far right blossom tree behind the cedar tree is the Laxton apple tree.

'Laxton's Superb' was first bred in 1897 by Laxton Brothers and introduced in 1922 having received an Award of Garden Merit from the Royal Horticultural Society in 1921. Laxton Brothers were a famous Victorian era company of plant breeders from Bedford in England. Laxton Brothers were also well known for breeding numerous fruit varieties (apples and strawberries in particular). Thomas Laxton's company continued to trade after his death in 1893 as "Laxton Brothers" as the company was taken over by his sons and grandsons, until it ceased trading in 1957 when it was taken over by Bunyard Nurseries. Bunyard eventually shut down the company and the orchards were built upon. However, the Laxton variety of apple still lives on as the town of Bedford has planted an orchard of the Laxton apple trees. Winston Churchill was also believed to have ordered fruit trees and plants for his Chartwell estate in Westerham, Kent. There are also surviving Laxton apple trees at Bank Hall in Bretherton, Lancashire.

== Growing ==
The 'Laxton Superb' is self-fertile, but cross pollination will maximise the yield. It generally flowers from April to May in the northern hemisphere. The tree often provides a heavy crop which is best harvested in October. It has a strong tendency to biennial (every other year) bearing.

== See also ==
- List of apple cultivars
