= Tinwell =

Village in Rutland, England

Coordinates: 52.662°N 0.533°W

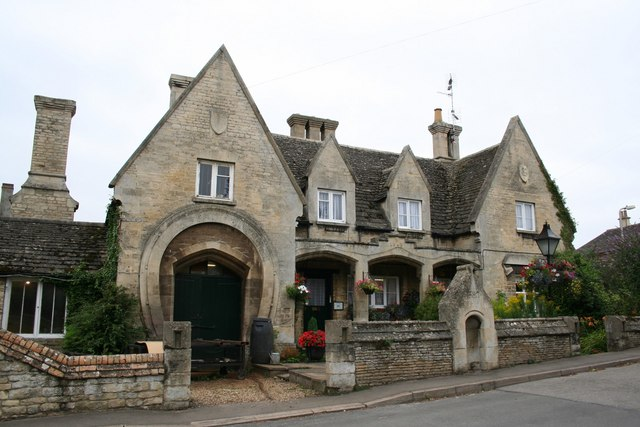
- Tinwell Forge

- Location within Rutland
- Area: 2.67 sq mi (6.9 km^{2})
- Population: 209 2001 Census
  - Density: 78/sq mi (30/km^{2})
- OS grid reference: SK993081
  - London: 82 miles (132 km) SSE
- Unitary authority: Rutland
- Shire county: Rutland
- Ceremonial county: Rutland
- Region: East Midlands
- Country: England
- Sovereign state: United Kingdom
- Post town: STAMFORD
- Postcode district: PE9
- Dialling code: 01780
- Police: Leicestershire
- Fire: Leicestershire
- Ambulance: East Midlands
- UK Parliament: Rutland and Stamford

Tinwell is a village and civil parish in the county of Rutland in the East Midlands of England. The population at the 2001 census was 209, increasing to 234 at the 2011 census.

== Village ==
The village's name origin is dubious. Possibly, 'spring/stream of the people of Tyni'. Alternatively, 'spring/stream of Tida' or 'spring/stream with goats'.

The village is just west of the A1 and within walking distance of the town of Stamford in Lincolnshire. The village has a well-used village hall, which provides a venue for parties and community events as well as regular special interest classes. Next door to the village hall is a football pitch which as well as providing a sports area is the venue for village parties. A recent major event on the field was the Queen's Diamond Jubilee in 2012 where hundreds of villagers and friends turned out for a sports day, barbeque and concert and the lighting of the jubilee beacon made at Tinwell Forge. Also nearby on Crown Lane is the village pub "The Crown" which is currently closed but has plans for refurbishment.

All Saints' Church, Tinwell has a distinctive tower with an unusual saddleback roof; these are rare in England and was added in about 1350.

In 2023, members of the church congregation returned a crucifix to the village of Doingt in northern France. The vicar in the 1930s, Percy Hooson, in the First World War had picked up the cross from the ruins of the church at Doingt following the Battle of the Somme. A local 16-year-old, on discovering its history, suggested it should be returned to Doingt which had been rebuilt.

Opposite the church is The Old Rectory, birthplace of Thomas Laxton (1830-1893) who conducted plant-breeding research for Charles Darwin and developed the Laxton Superb and Laxton Fortune apples and the Royal Sovereign strawberry.

Other buildings of interest are Tinwell Forge and Bakery which are located on Main Street and were built in 1848. At the front of the forge is a stone surround to the village spring, which was built for the Golden Jubilee of Queen Victoria; there is also a Victorian post box. The bakery closed in 1948 but the forge continues to be in operation. By the riverside is Tinwell Mill, although it is now a private house a mill stood at the same site during the Domesday period.

Walks can be taken from Tinwell south towards Easton on the Hill, with its Norman church and the Priest's House; west around the limestone quarry and along the rivers Chater and Welland towards Ketton, Aldgate and Geeston; and east following the Jurassic Way towards Stamford, and the Macmillan and Hereward Ways to Wothorpe and Burghley House. There is a footpath map showing these routes in the churchyard.

== Second World War ==
On 8 July 1944, two C47s collided after taking-off from RAF Spanhoe for an exercise. One crew member managed to parachute safely but eight others and 26 Polish paratroops of the Polish 1st Independent Parachute Brigade perished in the crash. The American casualties from 315th Troop Carrier Group were taken to the Cambridge American Cemetery for burial and the Polish casualties were taken to the Polish Cemetery at Newark. All those killed are commemorated in the church.

== Ingthorpe ==
The village is associated with the site of the lost or shrunken medieval village of Ingthorpe, in the north of the parish, close to the River Gwash.

== Twin towns ==
Tinwell is twinned with

- Doingt, France
