= Lord Lambourne =

Lord Lambourne may refer to:

- Amelius Lockwood, 1st Baron Lambourne (1847–1928), British soldier and politician
- Lord Lambourne (apple), type of apple introduced in 1907, see also List of apple cultivars
