= Rubodvirus =

Virus classification
- (unranked): Virus
- Realm: Riboviria
- Kingdom: Orthornavirae
- Phylum: Negarnaviricota
- Class: Bunyaviricetes
- Order: Hareavirales
- Family: Phenuiviridae
- Genus: Rubodvirus

Genus of viruses

Rubodvirus is a recently described plant virus genus belonging to the family Phenuiviridae in the order Hareavirales. These plant viruses are transmitted from plant to plant through graft transmission.

== Diseases ==
Apple rubbery wood, thought to be caused by Apple rubbery wood viruses 1 and 2, is a disease of apple trees that is characterized by flexible limbs and atrophy of the vascular tissue. Grapevine Garan dmak virus (GGDV) and Grapevine muscat rose virus (GMRV) both causes diseases of grapevines.

== Taxonomy ==
Rubodvirus was created to encompass Apple rubodviruses after it was determined to be caused by a virus, and not phytoplasmas, as previously thought. With Grapevine rubodviruses, genetic sequencing showed great protein similarity with the recently discovered Apple rubbery wood viruses 1 and 2, placing GMRV and GGDV in the genus Rubodvirus. The name "Rubodvirus" comes from Rub- in "rubbery", and -od in "wood".

The genus contains the following species, listed by scientific name and followed by the exemplar virus of the species:

- Rubodvirus argentinaense, Grapevine Muscat rose virus
- Rubodvirus armeniaense, Grapevine Garan dmak virus
- Rubodvirus mali, Apple rubbery wood virus 1
- Rubodvirus prosserense, Apple rubbery wood virus 2
