= Chaytor =

Chaytor is a surname of early English medieval origin which referred to the buyer of provisions for a large household, and may refer to:

- David Chaytor (born 1949), British politician
- Sir Edward Chaytor (1868–1939), New Zealand Army general
- Joshua Chaytor (1903–1937), Irish-born cricketer
- Henry John Chaytor (1871–1954), British academic
- Steven Chaytor (born 1976), Australian politician
- Tom Chaytor (1869–1951), Irish tennis player
- William Chaytor (disambiguation), several people

== See also ==
- Chater
- Dave Chaytors
