= All Saints' Church, Tinwell =

Church in Tinwell, Rutland

Coordinates: 52°38′45″N 0°30′52″W

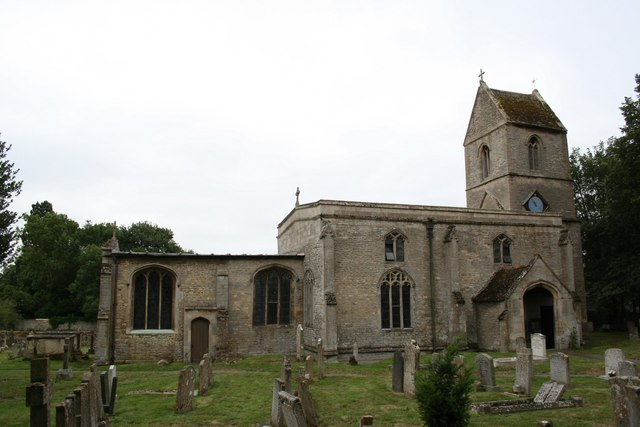
- Denomination: Church of England

History
- Dedication: All Saints

Administration
- Diocese: Peterborough
- Parish: Tinwell, Rutland

Clergy
- Rector: Olwen Woolcock

All Saints' Church is a church in Tinwell, Rutland, England. It is a Grade II* listed building.

== History ==
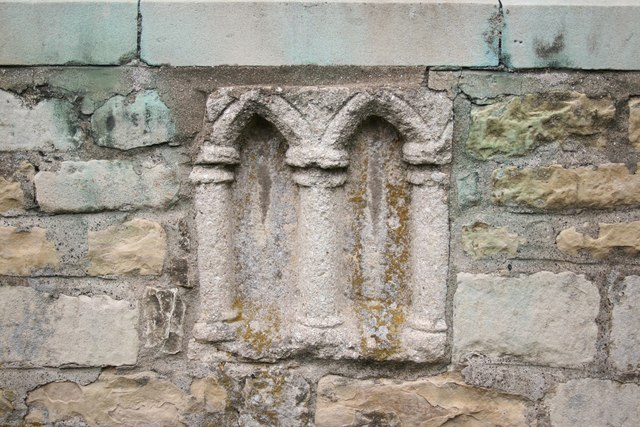
Gothic arches

The church dates from the 13th century but the windows date from the 15th century. The church is made up of a vestry, clerestory, tower, north porch, nave and chancel. The church has an unusual saddleback roof. The church was restored in the 19th century.

The chancel contains the grave of Elizabeth Cecil who married Hugh Alington of Tinwell, and was the sister of William Cecil, 1st Baron Burghley.

On 8 July 1944, two C47 aircraft collided after taking off from nearby RAF Spanhoe, killing 34 crew members and Polish paratroops of the Polish 1st Independent Parachute Brigade; they are commemorated in the church.

In 2023, the church congregation returned a crucifix to the village of Doingt in northern France. The vicar in the 1930s, Percy Hooson, in the First World War had picked up the cross from the ruins of the church at Doingt following the Battle of the Somme. A local 16-year-old, on discovering its history, had suggested it should be returned to the rebuilt church at Doingt.
