= Beatrix Havergal =

British horticulturist

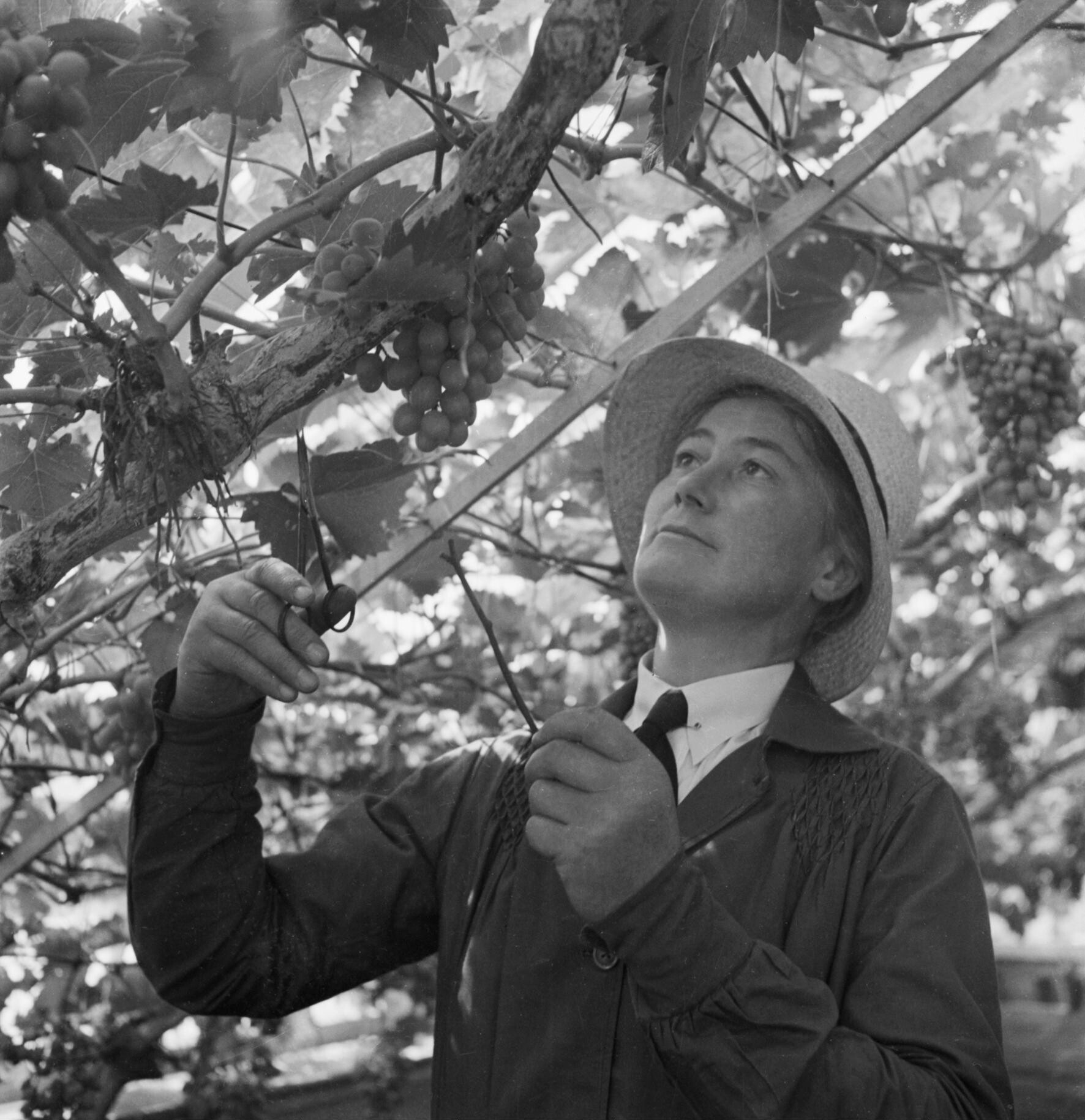
- Havergal in 1943
- Born: Grace Beatrix Helen Havergal; 7 July 1901; Roydon, South Norfolk
- Died: 8 April 1980 (aged 78); Woolton Hill, Hampshire
- Occupation: horticulturalist

Beatrix Helen Havergal MBE (born Grace Beatrix Helen Havergal, 1901-1980) was an English horticulturist.

In 1932 Havergal founded Waterperry School of Horticulture, a residential horticultural college for women. When she retired as principal in 1971, Waterperry School of Horticulture closed, though there remain gardens and a nursery there.

== Early life and education ==
Grace Beatrix Helen Havergal was born at Roydon Manor House in 1901, the second of three children born to the Revd. Clement Havergal (1854-1941) and his wife Eveline. She was also the great-niece of composer Frances Ridley Havergal.

The children had a peaceful upbringing despite the fact that their parents' relationship was often strained. In 1902, the family moved to Inkberrow near Redditch, then to Paris where the Rev. Havergal was assistant chaplain to the British Embassy for two years. Then, after a brief period spent at Bagthorpe in c. 1905, he became rector of Brent Eleigh in Suffolk. Havergal, together with her elder sister Frances, attended St Katherine's boarding school in Walmer after 1912, but after her parents divorced in 1914, she and her siblings moved with their mother to Bedford, where they lived at number 13 Sidney Road, and the children attended Bedford High School.

Havergal began working in horticulture after leaving school in 1916, taking on local gardening jobs under the auspices of the Women's War Agricultural Committee. Soon after, her father rejoined the family, and their finances improved sufficiently to allow Havergal to consider training. She ultimately chose to pursue horticulture over music. She subsequently attended the Thatcham Fruit and Flower Farm near Newbury, wherem she graduated in 1920, obtaining the Royal Horticultural Society's certificate with honours.

== Horticultural career ==
Havergal's first professional challenge was to design and create a garden at Cold Ash in Berkshire, where the high quality of her work brought her to the attention of Olive Willis, the headmistress of the nearby Downe House boarding school. Willis invited Havergal to become the school's head gardener, an offer which she accepted. She created six tennis courts at Downe House, which later became known as the Havergal Courts.

Havergal was inspired by Willis to gravitate towards education. Whilst at Downe House, she met the school's housekeeper, Avice Sanders, with whom she would remain partnered for the rest of the latter's life. In 1927, they moved to a cottage in the grounds of Pusey House, Oxfordshire and first began to teach students. With less than £250 at the outset, the school supplemented its income by growing produce, which was sold at Swindon Market. The courses combined theory and practical instruction with high standards of efficiency. This training (radically new at the time), ensured that Havergal's reputation grew substantially.

After Havergal's death Roald Dahl wrote to Quentin Blake describing how Blake's drawing of the character of Miss Trunchbull from his children's novel 'Matilda' should be based on Havergal's stature and dress sense. A copy of this letter is held at the Roald Dahl Museum and Story Centre in Great Missenden, Buckinghamshire. The photo Dahl was describing is also there, having been found in his filling cabinet in his writing shed. Dahl and Havergal are likely to have known one another due to their love of horticulture.

== Waterperry ==
In 1932, the school moved to Waterperry House, a small manor house in Waterperry, Oxfordshire, which originally was rented from Magdalen College. Havergal and Sanders purchased it in 1948. All students paid their own fees until 1958, when scholarships were granted by some county councils following recognition by the Board of Education. Havergal's diploma was accepted by the Institute of Parks Administration as one equal to those issued by Kew and Edinburgh. In 1962, it became an appropriate qualification for associate membership of the institute. Havergal was awarded an MBE in 1960 and the Royal Horticultural Society Veitch Memorial Medal and Victoria Medal of Honour in 1965. For many years Havergal won gold medal for her exhibit of Royal Sovereign strawberries at Chelsea Flower Show.

== Later life and retirement ==
Avice Sanders died in 1970. In 1971, with her health waning, Havergal sold the estate, leading to the closure of the school. She lived from then on in a cottage in the grounds. She died at Tower House, Woolton Hill, in 1980, while visiting her brother. She was buried in the churchyard of St Mary's Church in Waterperry on 14 April.
