= Edward Bunyard =

English writer

Edward Ashdown Bunyard (14 December 1878 – 19 October 1939) was a British horticulturalist, food writer and apple enthusiast known for his books The Anatomy Of Dessert, A Handbook of Hardy Fruits, and The Epicure's Companion.

== Life ==
Edward Ashdown Bunyard was born to nurseryman George Bunyard and Katherine Sophia Ashdown on 14 December 1878. He was one of eight children. The family firm, Bunyards Nursery, had nearly been bankrupted the year after Edward's birth but his father was able to recover the business. Edward Bunyard was educated at home and spent time in France studying the work of leading nurseries. He started work for Bunyards Nursery in 1896 and took over the business when his father died during the Spanish flu epidemic in 1919.

Bunyard was made a Fellow of the Linnean Society in 1914 for his work on pomology and genetics. He was a council member of the Royal Horticultural Society and was a key figure in the foundation of the East Malling Research Station and the National Fruit Collection now at Brogdale.

Bunyard was especially known for his publications The Anatomy Of Dessert, A Handbook of Hardy Fruits (1929), and The Epicure's Companion (1937), written with his sister Lorna.

Bunyard retired from the family business, handing over to his brother Norman, in 1939. He became journal editor and librarian of the RHS Lindley Library. He had begun radio broadcasting on gardening with C.H. Middleton in 1939.

Bunyard died by suicide on 19 October 1939 at the Royal Societies Club, London.

=== Legacy ===
His books and descriptions of apples are still used today by heritage apple growers and people appreciative of old apple varieties.
