= Laxton Brothers =

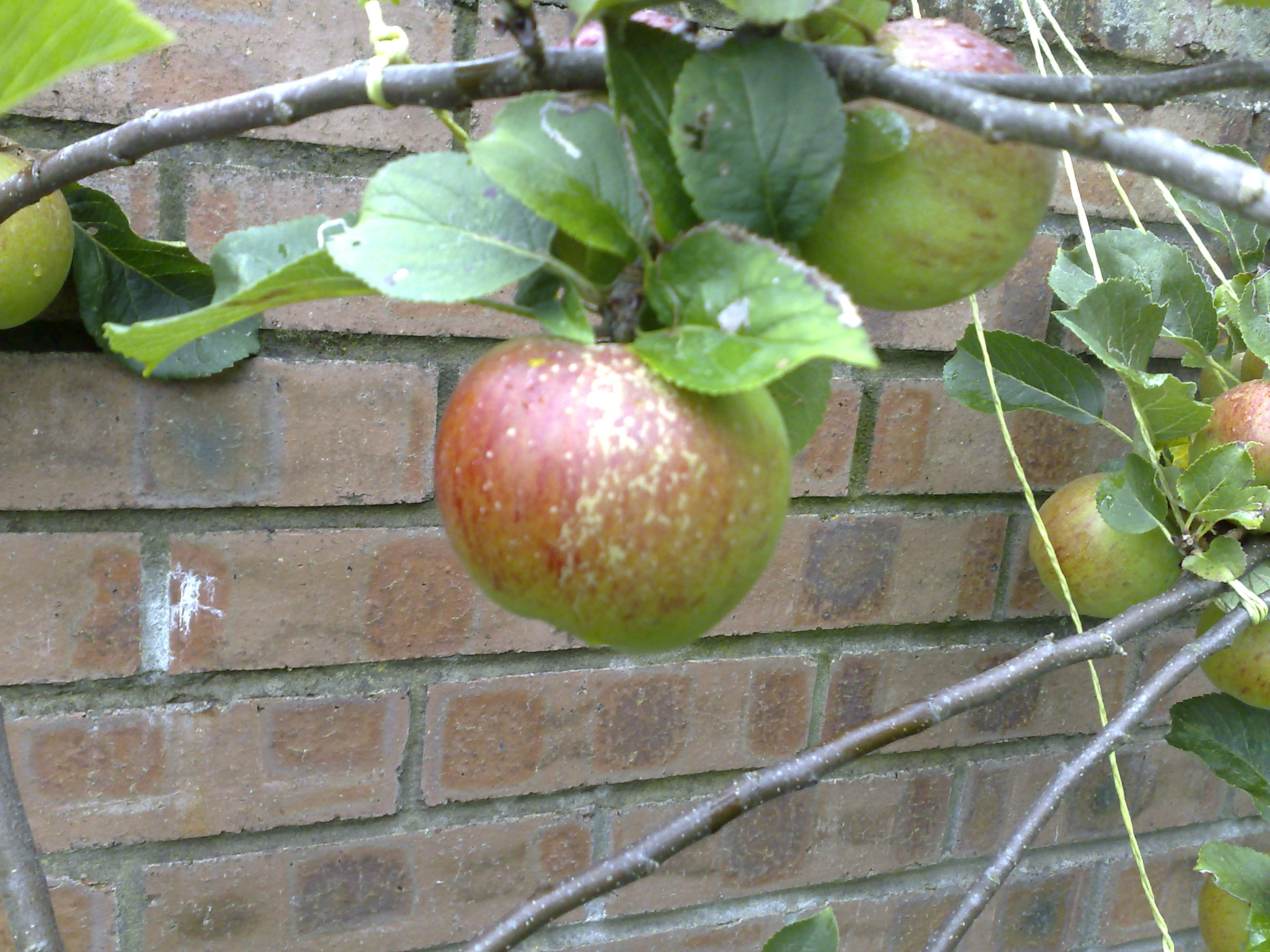
Lord Lambourne Apple, Laxton Brothers

Laxton Brothers was a business founded by Edward Augustine Lowe Laxton MBE (1869–1951) and William Hudson Lowe Laxton (1866–1923) who were notable horticulturists, pioneers of plant breeding and experts on fruit production creating several new strains of fruit such as 'Laxtonberry', 'Laxton's Delicious' plum tree, Laxton's No.1 red currant, Laxton’s Superb apples and the award-winning Lord Lambourne apple.

== History ==
Edward, educated at Bedford Modern School, and William were the sons of Thomas Laxton, a notable horticulturist and correspondent of Charles Darwin. They went into partnership in Bedfordshire in 1888 as ‘Laxton Brothers’, concentrating their attention on crossing the best varieties of apples, pears, plums and small fruits. Basing their developments on the breadth and depth of their father’s work, the brothers produced most of the 27 ‘Laxton’ strains of apple, 9 strains of ‘Laxton’ pears (Beurre Bedford, Laxtons´s Early Market, Laxton´s Foremost, Laxton´s Harvester, Laxton´s Record, Laxton´s Satisfaction, Laxton´s Superb, Laxton´s Victor, Laxton´s Wonderful) 9 strains of ‘Laxton’ plums and 6 strains of ‘Laxton’ strawberries. In 1937, Winston Churchill ordered raspberry plants from the Laxton Brothers to cultivate on his Chartwell estate in Kent.

William Hudson Lowe Laxton died on 14 December 1923 in Bedford at the age of 57. Edward Laxton continued to run the business with his son, Edward William Henry Laxton, until his son’s early death in 1942 when his house in Bedford took a direct hit by a German bomb.

Edward Laxton was made MBE in the 1951 New Year Honours but died shortly thereafter on 22 February 1951. The business was discontinued in 1957 when Laxton Brothers and Bunyards Nurseries amalgamated and ran as Bunyards and Laxtons Nurseries, operating from Brampton Nurseries in Huntingdon.

In honour of the brothers, an orchard consisting exclusively of their fruit trees was planted in Bedford in 1999.

== Publication ==
The Strawberry Manual, by Laxton Brothers. Published by Hulatt & Richardson (1899).
