= RAF Spanhoe =

Former Royal Air Force station in Northamptonshire, England

RAF Spanhoe RAF Wakerley USAAF Station AAF-493
- Located Near Uppingham, Rutland, England
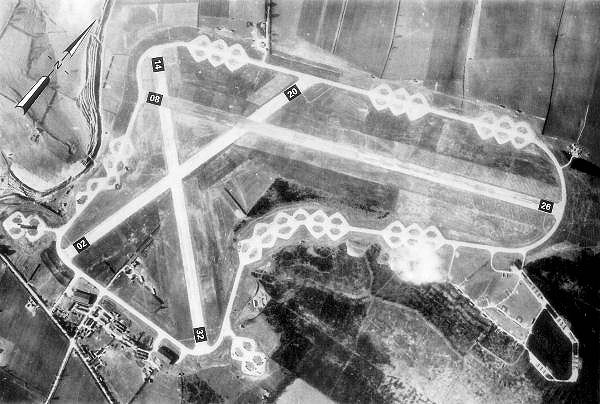
- A virtually empty Spanhoe Airfield - 2 March 1944, taken while most of the 315th Troop Carrier Group's C-47s were on operational missions. The runway pattern of the airfield was unusual for a Class-A airfield, with the end of the 26 runway being distant from the secondary runways.

Site information
- Type: Military airfield
- Code: UY
- Owner: Air Ministry
- Controlled by: Royal Air Force; United States Army Air Forces

Location
- RAF Spanhoe, shown within Northamptonshire
- Coordinates: 52°33′46″N 000°37′20″W

Site history
- Built: 1943
- In use: 1944-1945
- Battles/wars: European Theatre of World War II; Air Offensive, Europe July 1942 - May 1945

Garrison information
- Garrison: Ninth Air Force; RAF Maintenance Command
- Occupants: 315th Troop Carrier Group

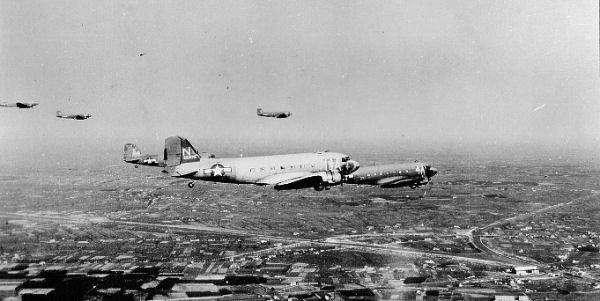
C-47s of the 310th TCS on a mission.

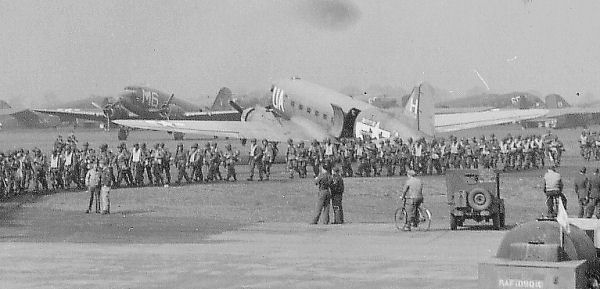
82d Airborne parachutists loading onto 43d and 309th TCS aircraft, 1944.

Royal Air Force Spanhoe or more simply RAF Spanhoe (also known as Harringworth or Wakerley) is a former Royal Air Force station near Uppingham in Northamptonshire, England. The airfield is located approximately 4 miles (6.4 km) east of Uppingham; about 80 miles (130 km) north-northwest of London

Opened in 1943, it was used by both the Royal Air Force and United States Army Air Forces. During the war it was used primarily as a transport airfield. After the war it was closed in late 1945.

Today, much of the airfield has been returned to agriculture, however one runway remains and the airfield is currently active and houses various privately owned light aircraft.

== USAAF use ==
The airfield was known as USAAF Station AAF-493 for security reasons by the USAAF during the war, and by which it was referred to instead of location. Its USAAF Station Code was "UV".

=== 315th Troop Carrier Group ===
Basically complete late in 1943 and opened on New Year's Day 1944, the station had already been earmarked for US troop carrier use and a station complement squadron moved in to ready the base between 4 and 7 January.

On 7 February 1944, the headquarters of the 315th Troop Carrier Group took up residence, a somewhat reduced organisation as most of the air echelon had been sent on detachment to Twelfth Air Force in North Africa during May 1943. The operational squadrons and fuselage codes of the group at Spanhoe were:

- 34th Troop Carrier Squadron (NM)
- 43rd Troop Carrier Squadron (UA)
- 309th Troop Carrier Squadron (M6)
- 310th Troop Carrier Squadron (4A)

The 315th TCG was part of the IX Troop Carrier Command 52nd Troop Carrier Wing.

On 8 July 1944 two Douglas C-47 Skytrains of the 315th collided shortly after take-off for an exercise. One crew member managed to parachute safely but eight others and 26 Polish paratroops perished in the crash at Tinwell, near Stamford.

Between 6/11 6 April 1945, the 315th TCG moved from Spanhoe to their Advanced Landing Ground (ALG) at Amiens/Glisy airfield, France (ALG B-48).

== Closure and Valiant crash ==
In 1946 RAF Spanhoe was closed and returned to the farmers from whom it had been requisitioned.

On 12 August 1960 a Vickers Valiant, BK1 XD864 of No. 7 Squadron, nose wheel failed to retract on takeoff from RAF Wittering. While sorting it out the aircraft stalled and crashed into the ground at Spanhoe airfield. All five of the crew were killed.

== Civil use ==
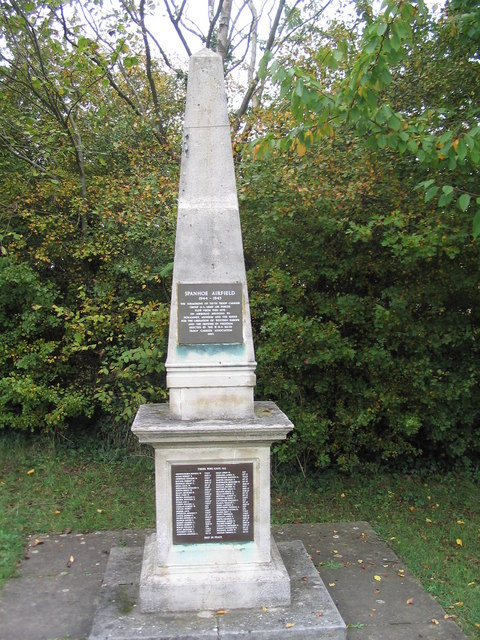
Memorial at entrance to the airfield

Between 1964 and 1967 the airfield was used by Perkins Engines Gliding Club, later known as Welland Gliding Club. The gliding club's origins were Perkins Engines Sports Association of Peterborough and moved to Spanhoe from their previous base at Westwood Airfield in Peterborough.

In the 1970s, the north and west areas were excavated for iron ore and today little of the airfield remains. The majority of the main runway was removed along with the perimeter track and dispersal hardstands, although a small portion of the northeast (08) end of the main runway remains along with part of the perimeter road and a few loop hardstands. The 02/20 secondary runway is faintly visible in aerial photography

As of 2007, the airfield is currently active and houses various privately owned light aircraft. It is also the home of Windmill Aviation. The south-western taxiway is now runway 27, and the southeast section of the wartime 14/32 runway was re-opened in 2004. Some of the wartime Nissen huts are in use and a new hangar and maintenance building was erected on the site of what was a large wartime J-type hangar.

A memorial obelisk on the approach road to the airfield commemorates the 315th Troop Carrier Group and a memorial in All Saints' Church, Tinwell commemorates US and Polish victims of the C-47 collision.

== See also ==
- List of former Royal Air Force stations
