= Royal Sovereign strawberry =

Strawberry cultivar

- Species: Fragaria ananassa
- Origin: Tinwell, Rutland, England, 1892

The Royal Sovereign is a strawberry cultivar. It is one of the oldest varieties still widely grown.

== History ==
The cultivar was created by Thomas Laxton in Tinwell, near Stamford, Lincolnshire, in 1892. Throughout the 19th century, botanists had been trying to create larger, sweeter varieties of strawberries. Laxton's 'Royal Sovereign' was one of the most successful, combining European flavour with American robustness.

'Royal Sovereign' was at the pinnacle of its popularity between the 1920s and the 1960s. Elizabeth II of the UK was served the variety at her coronation banquet. In the latter 20th Century, older strawberry cultivars fell out of favour commercially, displaced by modern varieties with longer shelf-lives, higher fruit yields and a better resistance to modern methods of transportation. Despite this, the variety is still highly prized amongst strawberry aficionados, and is still grown in small-scale cultivation, where flavour can take more precedence over yield quantity. The variety is still purchasable from specialist nurseries.

In 2012, Elizabeth II was served the variety again when a special crop was grown as a gift from Britain's soft fruit gardeners.

The horticulturalist Beatrix Havergal won fifteen golds for her exhibition of 'Royal Sovereign' at the Chelsea Flower Show.

== Characteristics ==
'Royal Sovereign', like many older cultivars, has a softer texture than most modern varieties. The flesh is bright orange-pink to scarlet. The cultivar is high in juice and is very sweet in taste.

Plants typically produce around 7–12 oz of fruit per plant.
