= Lord Lambourne (apple) =

Apple cultivar

'Lord Lambourne'
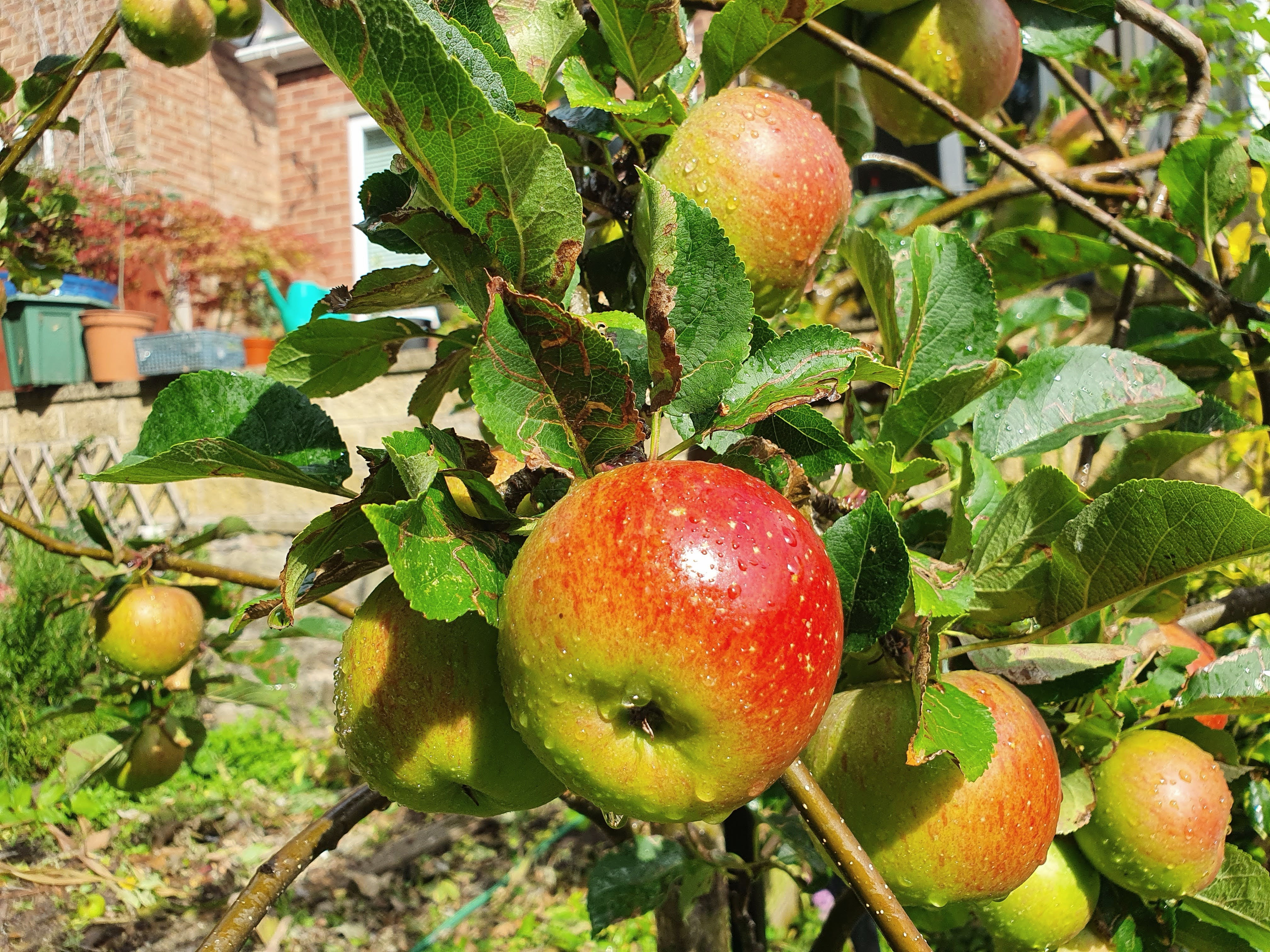
- Genus: Malus
- Species: Malus pumila
- Hybrid parentage: 'James Grieve' × 'Worcester Pearmain'
- Cultivar: 'Lord Lambourne'
- Origin: England, United Kingdom

Lord Lambourne is an apple cultivar with a sweet sharp flavor. It was raised by Laxtons Brothers Ltd in 1907 in Bedford, England. Received a Royal Horticultural Society Award of Merit in 1923.

== Appearance and flavour ==
The apple shape is broad globose conical, it has a distinctive orange blush mixed with a greenish yellow "background," and taste is sharp sweet.

== Cultivation ==
Lord Lambourne a mid season apple. It is sensitive to apple rubbery wood, apple chat fruit, apple canker, apple scab and honey fungus but has some resistance to powdery mildew.

== Descendant cultivars ==
- Prince Charles (Lord Lambourne × Cox's Orange Pippin)
- Rubin (Lord Lambourne × Golden Delicious)
- Karmen (Lord Lambourne × Linda)
- Zlatava (Lord Lambourne × Blahova Oranzova)
- Birgit Bonnier (Cortland × Lord Lambourne)
- Lady Lambourne (Sport of Lord Lambourne)
- Russet Lambourne (Sport of Lord Lambourne)
