= William Chaytor =

William Chaytor may refer to:

- Sir William Chaytor, 1st Baronet (1639–1721), of the Chaytor baronets
- William Chaytor (MP) (1732–1819), MP for Hedon
- Sir William Chaytor, 1st Baronet (1771–1847), son of the above
- Sir William Chaytor, 2nd Baronet (1805–1871), son of the above
- Sir William Chaytor, 3rd Baronet (1837–1896), son of the above, of the Chaytor baronets
- Sir William Chaytor, 4th Baronet (1867–1908), son of the above, of the Chaytor baronets
- Sir William Chaytor, 7th Baronet (1914–1976), of the Chaytor baronets

== See also ==
- Chaytor (surname)
