= Doingt =

- Commune
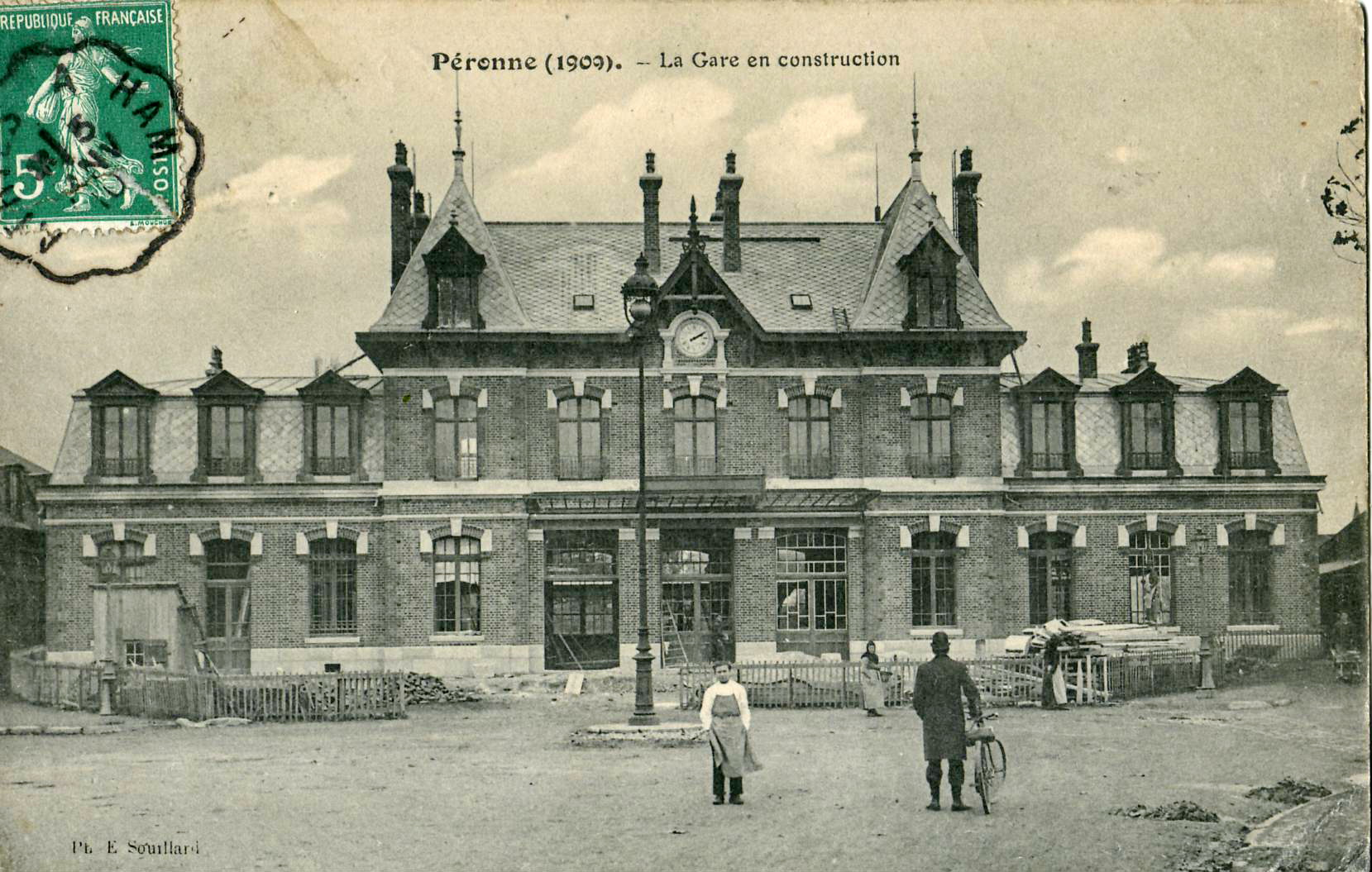
- The railway station of Péronne-Flamicourt, in 1909

- Coat of arms
- Location of Doingt
- Location within France Location within Hauts-de-France
- Coordinates: 49°55′25″N 2°57′58″E
- Country: France
- Region: Hauts-de-France
- Department: Somme
- Arrondissement: Péronne
- Canton: Péronne
- Intercommunality: Haute Somme

Government
  - Mayor (2020–2026): Romuald Helfried
- Area^{1}: 8.61 km^{2} (3.32 sq mi)
- Elevation: 150 m (490 ft)
- Highest elevation: 113 m (371 ft)
- Lowest elevation: 47 m (154 ft)
- Population (2023): 1,389
  - Density: 161/km^{2} (418/sq mi)
- Time zone: UTC+01:00 (CET)
  - Summer (DST): UTC+02:00 (CEST)
- INSEE/Postal code: 80240 /80200
- ^{1} French Land Register data, which excludes lakes, ponds, glaciers > 1 km^{2} (0.386 sq mi or 247 acres) and river estuaries.

Doingt (French pronunciation: [dwɛ̃]) is a commune in the Somme department of Hauts-de-France in northern France.

== Geography ==
Doingt is situated on the D937 and D199 junction, on the banks of the river Somme, some 30 miles (48 km) east of Amiens.

== History ==
During World War I the settlement was destroyed. A Commonwealth cemetery is just outside the town. The village and its church has been rebuilt and, in 2023, a crucifix, salvaged from the ruins of the village's church by a British military chaplain after the Battle of the Somme and placed in All Saints' Church, Tinwell in Rutland, England, was returned to the new church.

== Population ==
Historical population
Year	Pop.	±% p.a.
1968	1,542	—
1975	1,564	+0.20%
1982	1,449	−1.09%
1990	1,415	−0.30%
1999	1,383	−0.25%
2007	1,323	−0.55%
2012	1,334	+0.17%
2017	1,427	+1.36%
2023	1,389	−0.45%
Source: INSEE

== Twin Towns ==
Doingt is twinned with

- Tinwell, United Kingdom

== See also ==
- Communes of the Somme department
