= Royal Societies Club =

Club in London

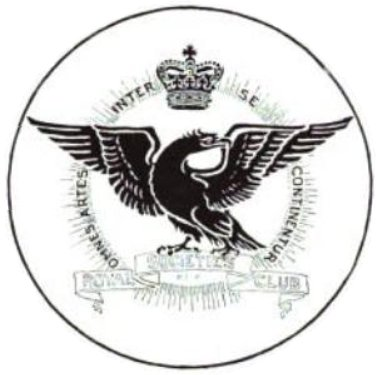

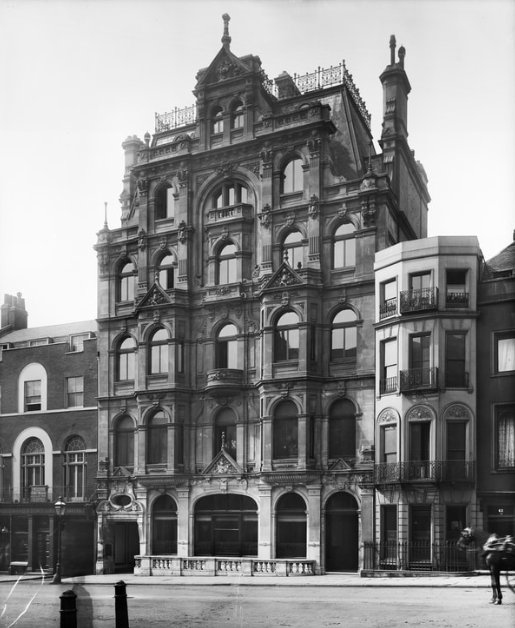
- Royal Societies Club building on St James's Street, London, photographed in May 1896
- Formation: 1894
- Founder: D. Lewis Poole
- Dissolved: Merger with the all-female Empress Club in 1941
- Type: Gentlemen's club
- Purpose: Learned endeavour
- Location: 63 St James's Street, London; 35 Dover Street, London
- Coordinates: 51.5065°N 0.1395°W
- Region served: UK, India, the colonies
- Affiliations: Royal and learned societies and universities

The Royal Societies Club was a London-based gentlemen's club, primarily for fellows and members of British, Indian and colonial royal and learned societies and universities. It was established in 1894, with its premises located at 63 St James's Street in Westminster, where it remained until the building was struck by a bomb during the Blitz in 1941. The club then merged with the all-female Empress Club, becoming the Empress and Royal Societies Club, with its headquarters on Dover Street, Mayfair.

== Founding ==
The oversubscription to the Athenaeum Club in the last decade of the 19th century and its candidates' consequent long wait for admission drove the establishment of a similarly serious club "for men of high rank in the intellectual world", with discussion regarding its formation commencing in February 1893. The Lancet recorded that in 1893, the year before the Royal Societies Club was founded, it received 800 applications for membership, including 65 Royal Society candidates and a number from the Athenaeum, with the first election of members taking place in the club's St James's Street building on 23 July 1894, the number of candidates by now reaching over 1,000. Baedeker's handbook of London gave the number of club members as 1,500 in 1900, which by 1908 had grown to 3,000 members.

The club adopted as its motto the phrase "Omnes artes inter se continentur" (All arts are interconnected), a modification of Cicero's "Omnes artes, quae ad humanitatem pertinent, habent quoddam commune vinculum, et quasi cognatione quadam inter se continentur" (The subtle bond of a mutual relationship links together all arts that have any bearing upon the common life of mankind) from his oration Pro Archia Poeta. The illustrated weekly journal The Sketch commented that the name of the new club was "cumbrous and awkward" and, given the number of letters that followed every member's name (FRS, FRGS, FRCS, etc.), it would be better known as "The Initials" club.

== Premises ==
The club's St James's Street premises, designed by architects Davis & Emanuel, were built on the site of Fenton's Hotel by Messrs Colls and Sons of Moorgate Street between 1886 and July 1888, originally for the soon-to-be-defunct Meistersingers Club. The Royal Societies Club acquired these premises between 1893 and 1894, but because some of the rooms were let out to other tenants, it was only in December 1894 that it gained sole possession, at which point it began a complete remodelling of the interior, enlargening a great many rooms at a cost of £20,000.

The building's front is five storeys high, displaying carving on its facade by Gilbert Scale, and according to the London County Council 1960 survey of St James's Street, "looks rather like a late Victorian music-hall designed by a latterday disciple of Dietterling, although its vulgarity is somewhat redeemed by the use of Portland stone throughout".

== History ==
The club's first president was Sir Clements Markham, at the time the president of the Royal Geographical Society.

Notable events at the club include banquets for Sir Edward Poynter on 2 December 1896 on his election as president of the Royal Academy and for Fridtjof Nansen on 5 February 1897, documented in the drawing "Dr Nansen at the Royal Societies Club, the Reception after the Banquet" by Henry M. Paget; a dinner held on 7 November 1898 in honour of Lord Curzon before his departure for India to assume the role of viceroy early the following year; and a lunch hosted by the Earl of Halsbury, the club president, for Ernest Shackleton and companions on 16 June 1909, after their return from the Nimrod expedition to the Antarctic.

In an attempt to establish himself in London but lacking the funds and status to join a more prestigious establishment, Siegfried Sassoon was elected to the club in 1908 and paid the one guinea entrance fee, but except for its library he found the club exceedingly dull and refused to name it in his autobiography, instead referring to it as the "United Nonentities Club". By 1911, the fees had evidently increased, with Ralph Nevill noting what he calls "a somewhat peculiar subscription, town members – that is, those residing within a radius of twenty miles – paying eight guineas, country members six, and colonial and foreign members two".

Several club members died at the Royal Societies Club: on 30 October 1899, the architect Sir Arthur William Blomfield suddenly died on the premises; on 19 October 1939, Edward Bunyard, a horticulturalist, food writer and pomologist, committed suicide by a shot to the head at the club using a revolver that he kept to shoot bullfinches, a pest to apple growers.

The joint Empress and Royal Societies Club at 35 Dover Street was still in existence in 1952 but had ceased to operate in 1956.

== Gallery ==
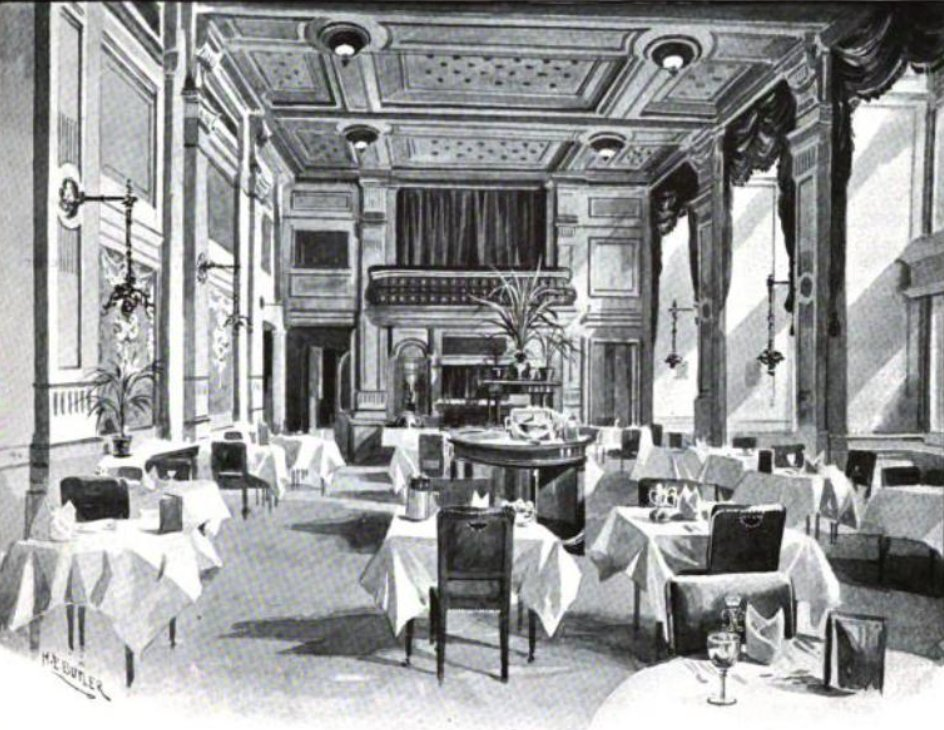
"The Dining-Room of the Royal Societies Club", from a drawing by Herbert E. Butler, 1899

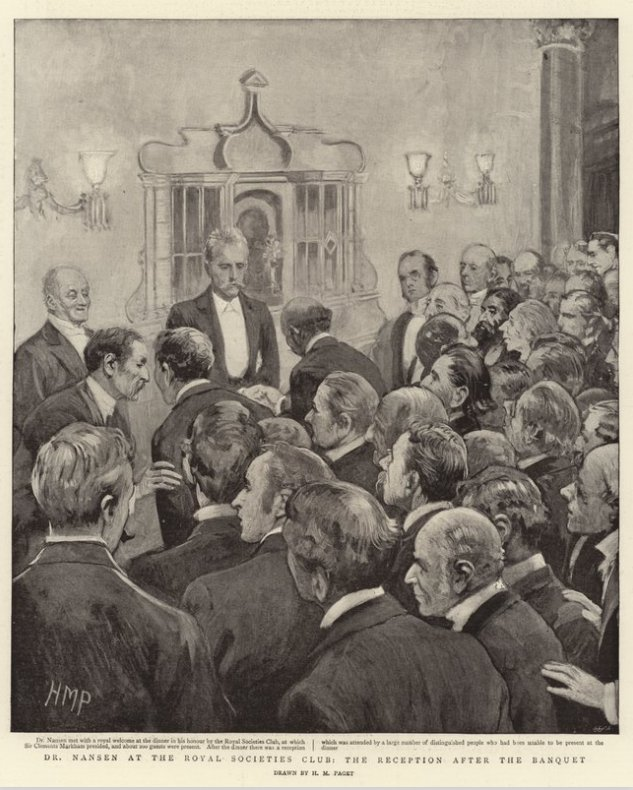
"Dr Nansen at the Royal Societies Club, the Reception after the Banquet", Henry M. Paget, 1897

Royal Societies Club: Foundation and Objects, Rules and By-Laws, List of Members, published in 1897

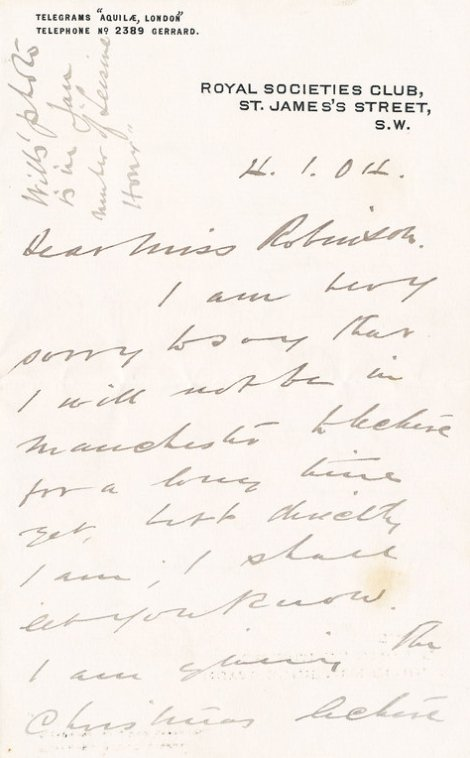
Letter from Ernest Shackleton to Edith Robinson on Society paper, dated 4 January 1904
