= Birgit Bonnier =

Apple cultivar

'Birgit Bonnier'
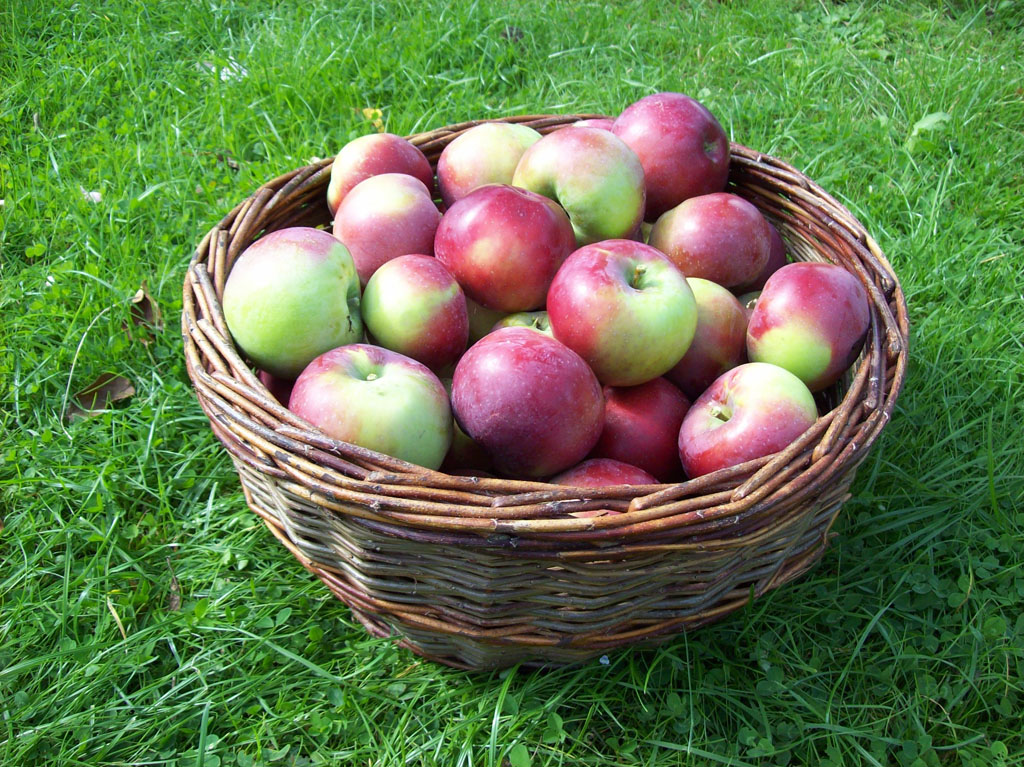
- Genus: Malus
- Species: Malus pumila
- Hybrid parentage: Cortland x Lord Lambourne
- Cultivar: 'Birgit Bonnier'
- Origin: Sweden

'Birgit Bonnier' is a modern cultivar of domesticated apple which have some resistance to apple scab and mildew.

'Birgit Bonnier' was developed in Sweden through a cross between the popular 'Cortland' and the 'Lord Lambourne'. The result is an apple of a pleasant flavor. Shape is flat. Background color is whitish green and flushed or with striped with orange red. Fruit is low in juiciness making it more recommended for a dessert apple.

This cultivar was named by the Swedish publisher Albert Bonnier, who named it after his wife Birgit.
