= Bunyards Nursery =

British horticultural company founded 1796

1898 advertisement

Bunyards Nursery (also known as Bunyard & Co., or Bunyard's Royal Nursery) was a nursery founded in 1796 at Allington, near Maidstone. It specialised in fruit and roses.

== History ==
Bunyard's Nursery was established on 16 September 1796 near Maidstone, established by James Bunyard.

Before the arrival of the railways, business was local and developed gradually. From the 1860s, the nursery acquired land in Allington where orchards were planted. It was nearly bankrupted in 1879 but George Bunyard was able to win a contract to supply half a million trees to Sudeley Castle and the business recovered and continued to expand through the late 1800s.

The nursery became the Royal Nursery by appointment to Queen Victoria and grew fruit trees across over 300 acres and within 66 glasshouses.

In the late 1950s, Bunyards and Laxton Brothers amalgamated and ran as Bunyards and Laxtons Nurseries, operating from Brampton Nurseries in Huntingdon.

== Bunyard family ==
James Bunyard (fl. 1790s – 1810s) established the nursery.

George Bunyard (5 February 1841 – 22 January 1919) becan working in the nursery in 1855 and became a partner in 1863 then head in 1881. He secured its reputation as a leading producer of fruit trees. He was involved in the 1888 Apple and Pear Conference, speaking about commercial orchards.

George's son, Edward Ashdown Bunyard (14 December 1878 – 19 October 1939), joined the Nursery from 1896 and he and his younger brother (George) Norman (1886 – 1969) took over when George died during the influenza epidemic of 1919. Norman was the first secretary of the British Iris Society. Edward was considered a leading pomologist and was involved in the emerging science of genetics. He was a member of the Royal Horticultural Society council and helped set up commercial trials at Wisley in 1922. He also helped to establish the National Fruit Collection at Brogdale, insisting that a living 'reference library' of fruits should be preserved as an example against which to check new varieties.

== Legacy ==
The nursery supplied plants to Vita Sackville-West for Sissinghurst when she planted the rose garden in 1937. Bunyard roses were also supplied to Hidcote, Kiftsgate and Constance Spry's garden at Chelsfield.

Bunyard's catalogues are held by Oregon State University archives and valued by historians for the information that Edward Bunyard included on the dates of introductions of a wide variety of fruits.

In 2013, local politician Dan Daley was part of a campaign to have the former nursery site designated as a local nature reserve to protect an estimated 20,000 protected species living there.
