= Apple rubbery wood =

Apple rubbery wood virus

Virus classification
- (unranked): Virus
- Realm: Riboviria
- Kingdom: Orthornavirae
- Phylum: Negarnaviricota
- Class: Bunyaviricetes
- Order: Hareavirales
- Family: Phenuiviridae
- Genus: Rubodvirus

Synonyms
- Apple rubbery wood disease; Apple rubbery wood MLO; Apple rubbery wood virus; Pyrusvirus molliens; Quince bark necrosis virus; Quince yellow blotch agent; Quince yellow blotch virus

Species of virus

Apple rubbery wood virus, also known as apple rubodvirus, is a virus that causes the disease apple rubbery wood in apple and pear cultivars. There are two species: Apple rubbery wood virus 1 (ARWV 1) and Apple rubbery wood virus 2 (ARWV 2). It gets its name from its distinctive effect that it has on its host trees, which show unusual flexibility in the stems and branches after a few years of infection. This often results in the maturing fruits of the tree to weigh down the branches such that they lay on the ground. Apple rubbery wood, or ARW, occurs worldwide, affecting apple and pear cultivars in most developed countries.

== Taxonomy ==
Originally, ARW was assumed to be caused by phytoplasmas, but it could not be confirmed through multiple tests. In 2019, it was suggested that both ARW 1 and 2 are given their own new genus, "Rubodvirus" (Rubbery wood virus), the name coming from Rub- in "Rubbery", and -od in "wood".

== Symptoms ==
Limbs of the host tree become abnormally flexible, becoming unable to stay upright in most cases. Tree growth is stunted, and new stems and limbs are unable to grow, are distorted, or are rosetted. The limbs of affected trees are distinctly "flat", caused by atrophy of the vascular tissue. On some trees, like Quince, bark necrosis and discolored leaves can occur.

== Impact ==
ARW rarely occurs by itself, and instead often occurs along with multiple other diseases, such as powdery mildew and scabbing. Its biggest effect in losses is through fruit yield, which can be reduced by 10–30%, though it isn't of much economic significance in countries where it is extant. It is transmitted from tree to tree through grafting of infected limbs.

ARW is known to infect multiple cultivars, including:

- Cydonia oblonga (quince)
- Malus (ornamental species apple)
- Malus baccata (Siberian crab apple)
- Malus domestica (apple)
- Prunus avium (sweet cherry)
- Prunus cerasus (sour cherry)
- Pyrus communis (European pear)

== Treatment ==
In Europe, heat treatment can be used to render trees disease-free. A period of 7 days of dry heat exposure (38°C) is effective on young, infected trees.
