= Thomas Laxton =

British plant breeder

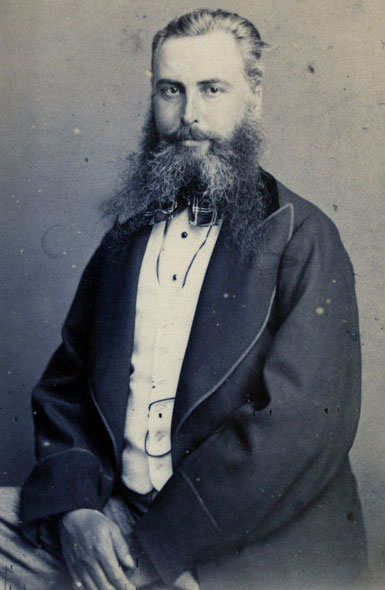
Thomas Laxton (c. 1865)

Thomas Laxton (1830 – 6 August 1893) was a plant breeder and a correspondent of Charles Darwin, best known for his hybridisation of peas.

Thomas Laxton was born in the village of Tinwell, Rutland in 1830. He practised as a solicitor in Stamford before his interest in horticulture led him to become an authority on plant hybridisation. By 1858 Laxton was breeding plants. Initially he worked from St Mary's Hill, Stamford and corresponded with Charles Darwin from this address. Early correspondence with Darwin referred to Laxton's work on hybridising peas. Laxton applied scientific methods to plant breeding, making careful observations of parent plants. He recognised the susceptibility of plants to disease and resistance of these diseases by their American counterparts.

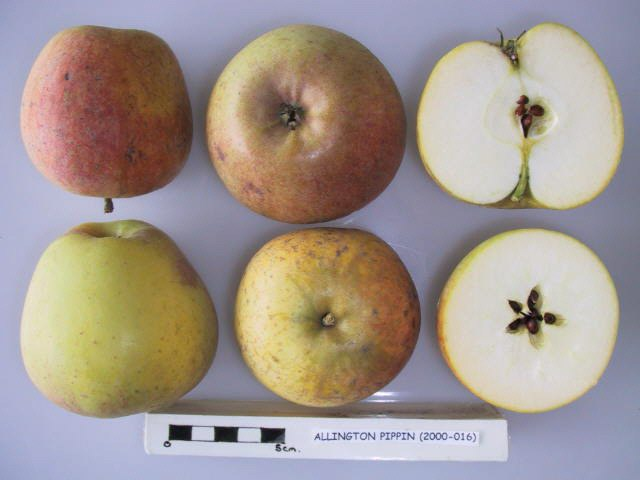
Cross section of Allington Pippin, National Fruit Collection (acc. 2000-016); raised by Thomas Laxton before 1884. It received a First Class Certificate from the Royal Horticultural Society in 1894 under its original name, 'Brown's South Lincoln Beauty'

Laxton made observations on gooseberries and Darwin corresponded with him during the 1860s and 1870s on his work. He is probably widely remembered for his contribution to strawberry breeding. In 1872 he began to introduce strawberry varieties from his plant breeding work. Laxton moved the business to Bedford in 1879 and in 1885 Kelly's Directory identifies him as a 'seed grower and merchant' listed at 1 Harpur Place, Bedford. In 1884 he introduced his first major strawberry success 'Noble' a chance seedling of 'Excelsior' and 'American Sharpless'. Followed by 'King of the Earlies' in 1888. These two varieties formed the parentage of Laxton’s 'Royal Sovereign strawberry' in 1892.

Laxton married twice, with three daughters from his first marriage and four sons from his second marriage. Two sons, William Hudson Lowe Laxton (1866–1923) and Edward Augustine Lowe Laxton MBE (1869–1951) went into partnership to form Laxton Brothers in 1888. Thomas Laxton died in August 1893. The brothers recognised their father's horticultural contribution by introducing the pea 'Thomas Laxton' in his honour in 1898.
