= Cellini (surname) =

Cellini is an Italian surname. Notable people with the surname include:

- Benvenuto Cellini (1500–1571), Italian goldsmith, painter, sculptor, soldier and musician
- Dino Cellini (1914–1978), Italian-American mobster
- Julie Cellini (21st century), American journalist
- Karen Cellini (born 1958), American actress
- Marco Cellini (born 1981), Italian footballer
- Renato Cellini (1912–1967), Italian opera conductor
- Vince Cellini (born 1959), American sports announcer
