= Chater =

Chater may refer to:

== People ==
- Arthur Reginald Chater (1896–1979), Royal Marines general
- Dan Chater (1870–1959), British politician
- David Chater (born 1953), British broadcast journalist
- Elizabeth Chater (1910–2004), Canadian author of novels and poetry
- Eos Chater (born 1976), Welsh violinist
- Geoffrey Chater (1921–2021), English actor
- Gordon Chater (1922–1999), Australian actor and comedian
- Hilda Chater (1874–1968), Irish and English chess master
- James Chater (born 1951), British composer and musicologist
- John W. Chater, 19th-century English publisher, printer and bookseller
- Kamel Chater (born 1972), Tunisian boxer
- Keith Chater (born 1944), British microbiologist
- Kerry Chater (born 1945), Canadian musician and songwriter
- Paul Chater (1846–1926), British businessman in Hong Kong
- Shirley Chater (born 1932), American nurse, educational administrator and government official
- Tony Chater (1929–2016), British former newspaper editor and communist activist
- Veronica Chater, American author
- William Chater (1821–1880), English organist, composer, conductor and teacher

== See also ==
- Chaytor
