= Cellini (apple) =

Apple cultivar

'Cellini' apple
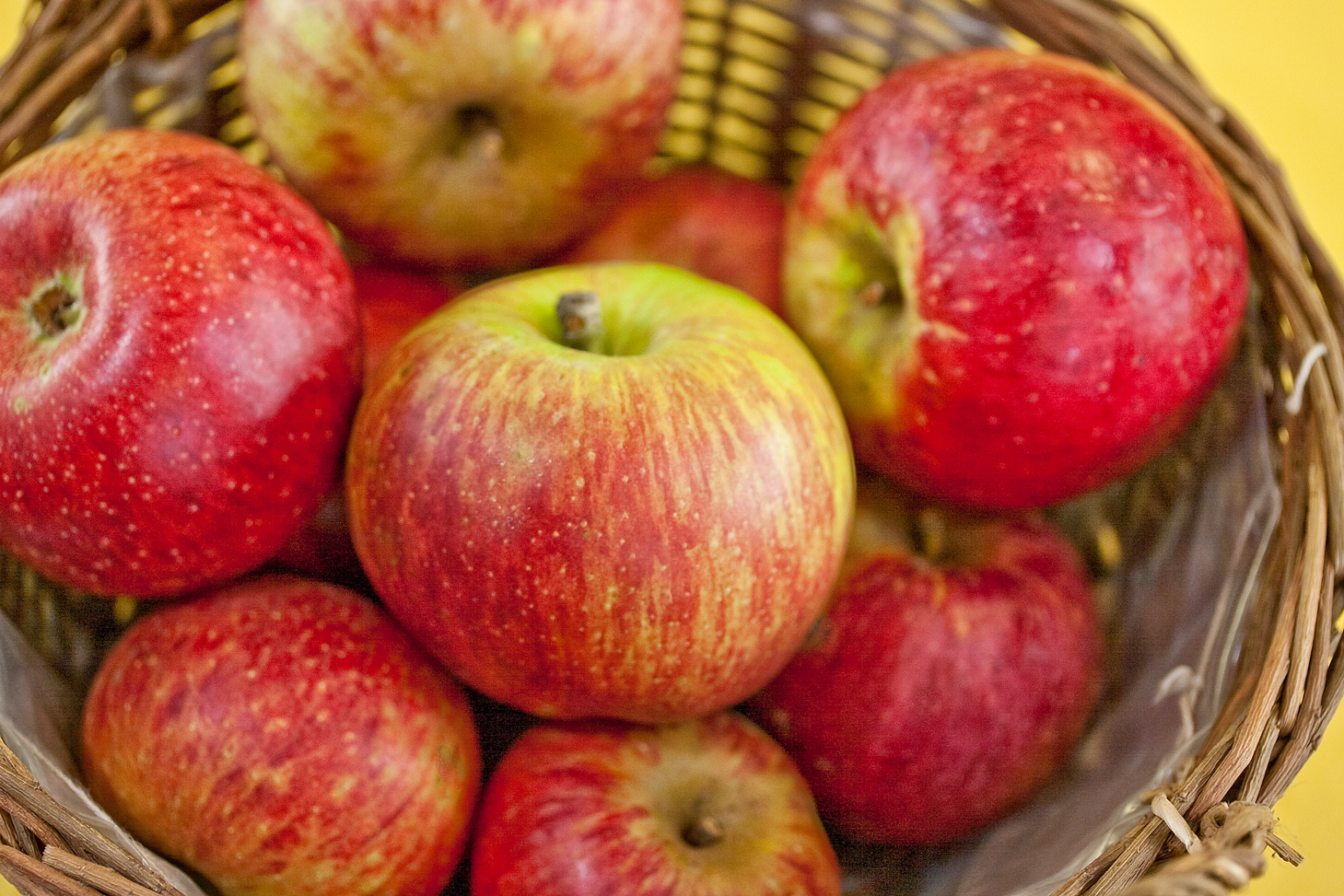
- Genus: Malus
- Species: Malus domestica
- Hybrid parentage: 'Nonsuch' × unknown
- Cultivar: 'Cellini'

'Cellini' is an apple cultivar that was selected from a seed of a tree referred to as 'Nonsuch', though that name is ambiguous. It was introduced in about 1828 by Leonard Phillips, who operated a nursery at Vauxhall, London. It is a soft-textured cooking apple, juicy and coarse-textured. This cultivar is a parent of several other successful apple cultivars.

== See also ==
- List of apple cultivars
