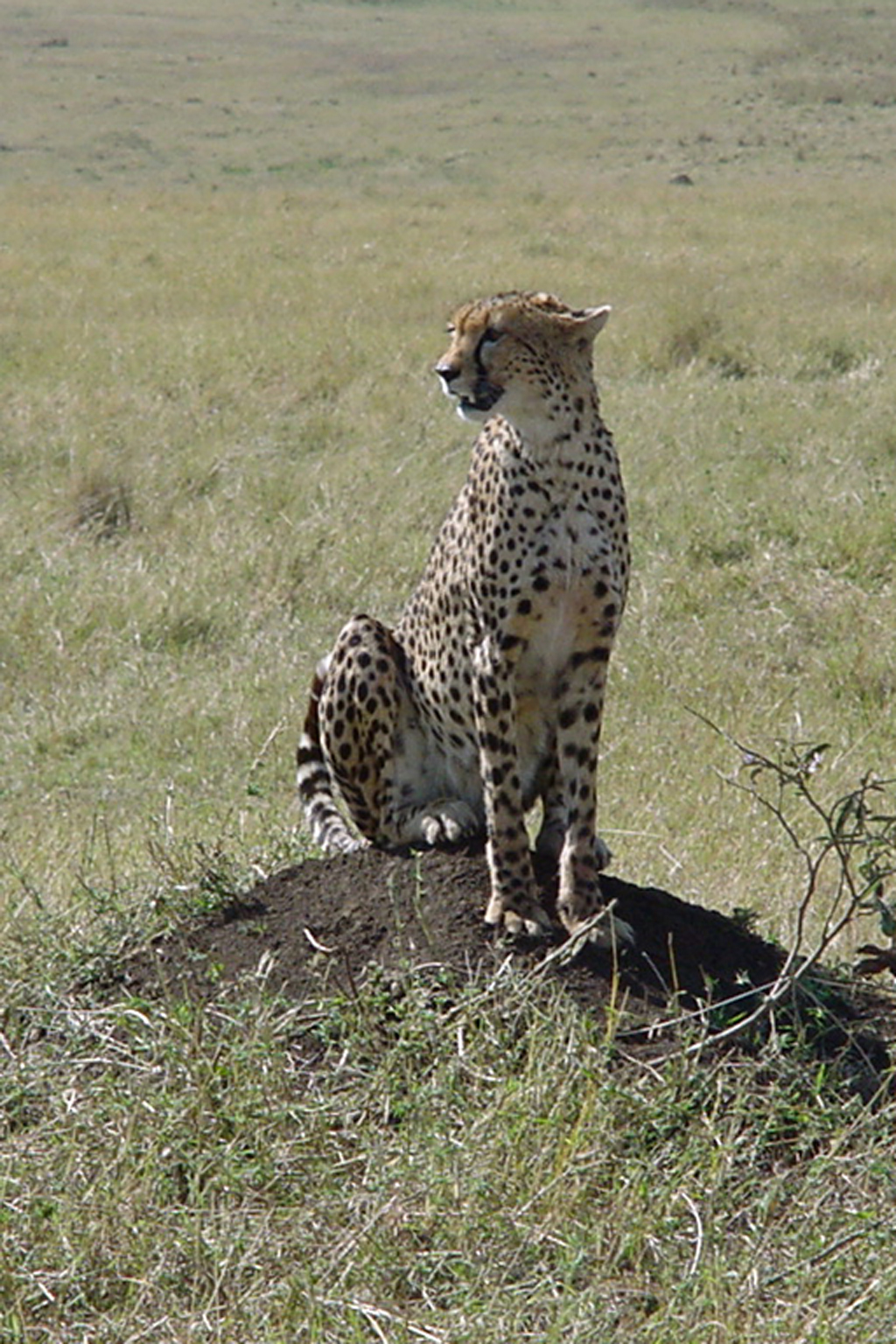
- A cheetah in Masai Mara, Kenya

Scientific classification
- Kingdom: Animalia
- Phylum: Chordata
- Class: Mammalia
- Order: Carnivora
- Family: Felidae
- Genus: Acinonyx
- Species: A. jubatus
- Subspecies: A. j. jubatus

Trinomial name
- Acinonyx jubatus jubatus (Schreber, 1775)
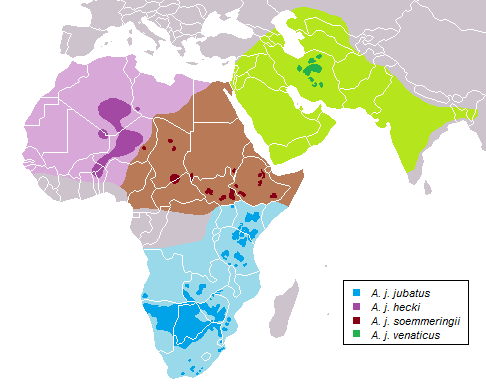
- A. j. raineyi range (red)

Synonyms
- Acinonyx jubatus raineyi (Heller, 1913); A. j. ngorongorensis (Hilzheimer, 1913)

= East African cheetah =

Subspecies of carnivore

The East African cheetah (Acinonyx jubatus jubatus), is a cheetah population in East Africa. It lives in grasslands and savannas of Tanzania, Kenya, Uganda and Somalia. The cheetah inhabits mainly the Serengeti ecosystem, including Maasai Mara, and the Tsavo landscape.

A cheetah from British East Africa was described by the American zoologist Edmund Heller in 1913. He proposed the trinomen Felis jubatus raineyi as a distinct subspecies. It also was recognized as several other distinct subspecies, such as A. j. ngorongorensis and A. j. velox. In 2017, the Cat Classification Task Force of the Cat Specialist Group subsumed A. j. raineyi to A. j. jubatus.

In 2007, the total number of cheetahs in East Africa were estimated at 1,960 to 2,572 adults and independent adolescents. East African cheetahs form the second-largest population after the Southern African cheetah. In 2007, there were between 569 and 1,007 cheetahs in Tanzania, between 710 and 793 cheetahs in Kenya, between 40 and 295 cheetahs in Uganda and approximately 200 left in Somalia. Kenya is the main stronghold for the East African cheetah, with the largest population of 800 to 1,200 adults in the country since 2015. In 2016, it was estimated that more than 1,000 individuals are resident in the Serengeti/Maasai Mara ecosystem of Tanzania and Kenya.

Formerly widespread in East Africa, the East African cheetah lost a high percent of ranges and has gone extinct in three countries; the eastern Democratic Republic of the Congo (the North Kivu province and the South Kivu province), Rwanda and Burundi.

== Taxonomy ==
In the 19th and 20th centuries, several cheetah type specimens from East Africa were described and proposed as subspecies:

- The Scottish zoologist Andrew Smith proposed the scientific name Felis fearsoni in 1834 for a specimen from the northeast of the Natalia Republic. The name was also spelled fearoni, fearonii or even fearonis by Leopold Fitzinger in 1869. Therefore, A. j. fearsoni was never accepted as a scientific name or a synonym.
- In 1913, the American zoologist Edmund Heller described a cheetah under the trinomen Acinonyx jubatus raineyi, which had been shot by the American hunter Paul J. Rainey at the Ulu Station of Kapiti Plains in Kenya in 1911. The East African cheetah, also known as Rainey's cheetah, was named in honor of Rainey.
- Heller also proposed the scientific name Acinonyx jubatus velox for a cheetah shot by Kermit Roosevelt in June 1909 in the Loita Plains, near Narok in British East Africa. He called it African highland cheetah. The skin is darker in color and has large black spots, which are more numerous than in raineyi's, and has the largest body size among cheetah zoological specimen.
- In 1913, the German zoologist Max Hilzheimer proposed the name "Acinonyx jubatus ngorongorensis" for a type specimen from the Ngorongoro area in Tanzania.

Other naturalists and zoologists also described cheetahs from other parts of East Africa that were all considered synonyms of A. j. raineyi.

In 2005, the authors of Mammal Species of the World recognized A. j. raineyi and A. j. velox as valid taxa, and considered A. j. ngorongorensis synonymous with A. j. raineyi.

In 2017, the Cat Classification Task Force of the Cat Specialist Group subsumed A. j. raineyi and A. j. velox to A. j. jubatus, thus recognizing only one subspecies in Southeastern and Southern Africa.

== Evolutionary history ==
The earliest African cheetah fossils from the early Pleistocene have been found in the lower beds of the Olduvai Gorge site in northern Tanzania.

Not much was known about the East African cheetah's evolutionary story, although at first, the East and Southern African cheetahs were thought to be identical as the genetic distance between the two subspecies is low. In the 1990s, it appeared from a DNA research that the East African cheetah is a separate subspecies differing from the Southern African cheetah.

In early 2011, results of phylogeographic genetic analysis on cheetah subspecies revealed more about the distinctiveness and significant differences between cheetah subspecies, revealing the connection between the East and Southern African populations. The mitochondrial DNA data shows that the East African cheetah had no common haplotype with the Southern African cheetah, although one haplotype consisting cheetah populations from Tanzania and Kenya clustered with Southern African cheetah. It was suggested that a population in East Africa might be derived from a relatively recent re-colonization events. The mtDNA study reveals that the divergence between the two populations occurred between 28,000 and 36,000 years ago.

== Characteristics ==
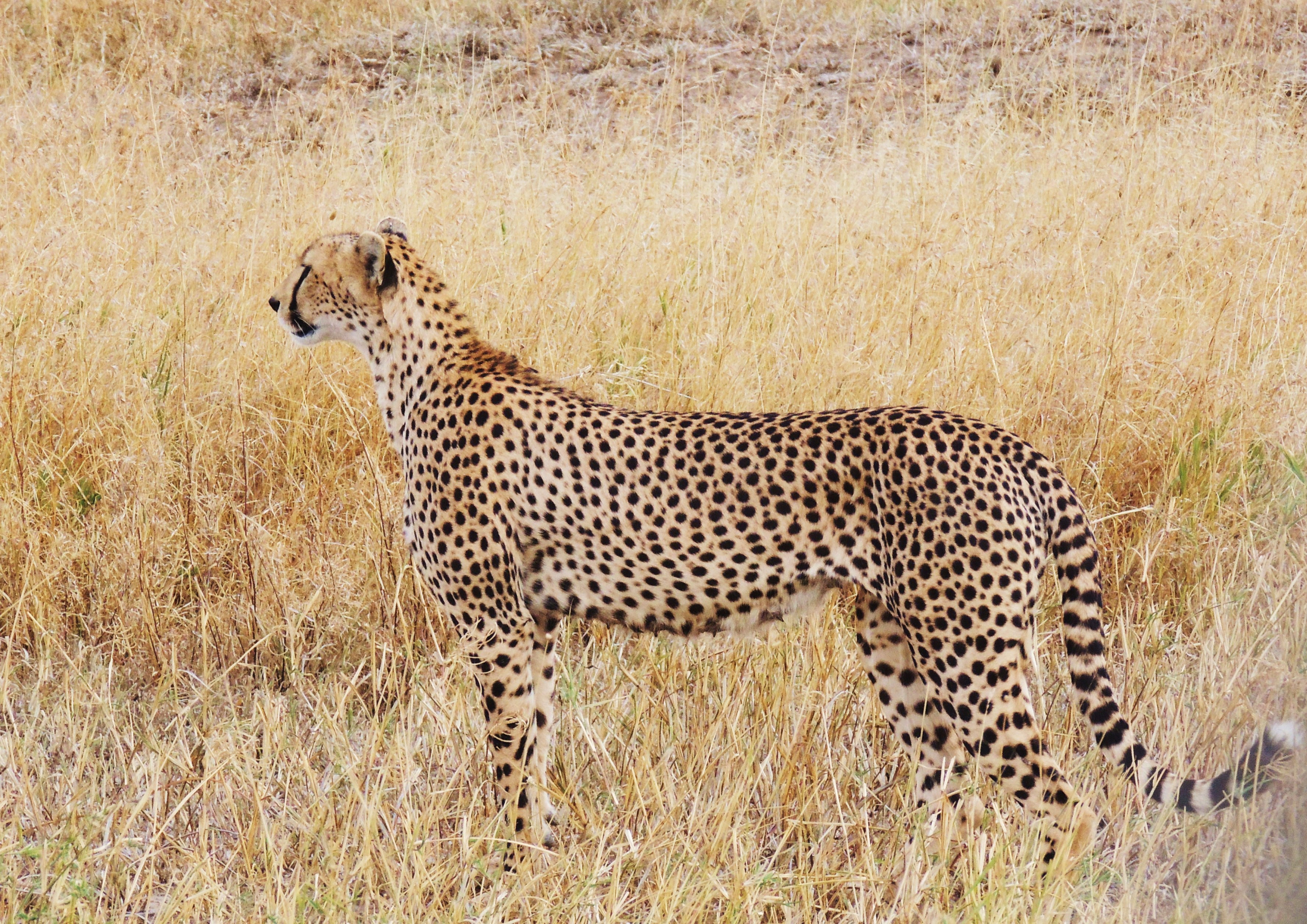
A tall female cheetah at Tarangire National Park, Tanzania

The East African cheetah has a white-yellowish to a tannish coat. Its fur is usually short and lean, and some can have a thick coarse fur on the belly. It has many round black spots, some can be found on the chests and neck, except on its white underside. The spots merge toward the end of the tail to form four to fourteen dark rings followed by a white tuft at the tip of the tail. Its tear marks run from the corner of the eyes to the mouth which reduces the glare of sunlight in its eyes, which is relatively thick. It also has a slighter build than other African cheetahs. It measures around 110–135 cm (43–53 in) in head-and-body length and weigh between 70 and 75 kg (154 and 165 lb). Males are usually larger than females. Cheetahs in Tanzania measure 200–220 cm (79–87 in) in length and weigh 50 and 60 kg (110 and 130 lb). The largest have been recorded in Kenya. Depth of skull and length of mandible are significantly larger in males.

There have been reports about cheetahs of other color variations, such as melanism and ticked. A melanistic cheetah was sighted in the Trans-Nzoia District of Kenya in 1925. A ticked spotless cheetah was shot in Tanzania in 1921, it had only a few very small spots on the neck and back. Another cheetah with this color-morph was photographed in Kenya in 2012.

== Distribution and habitat ==
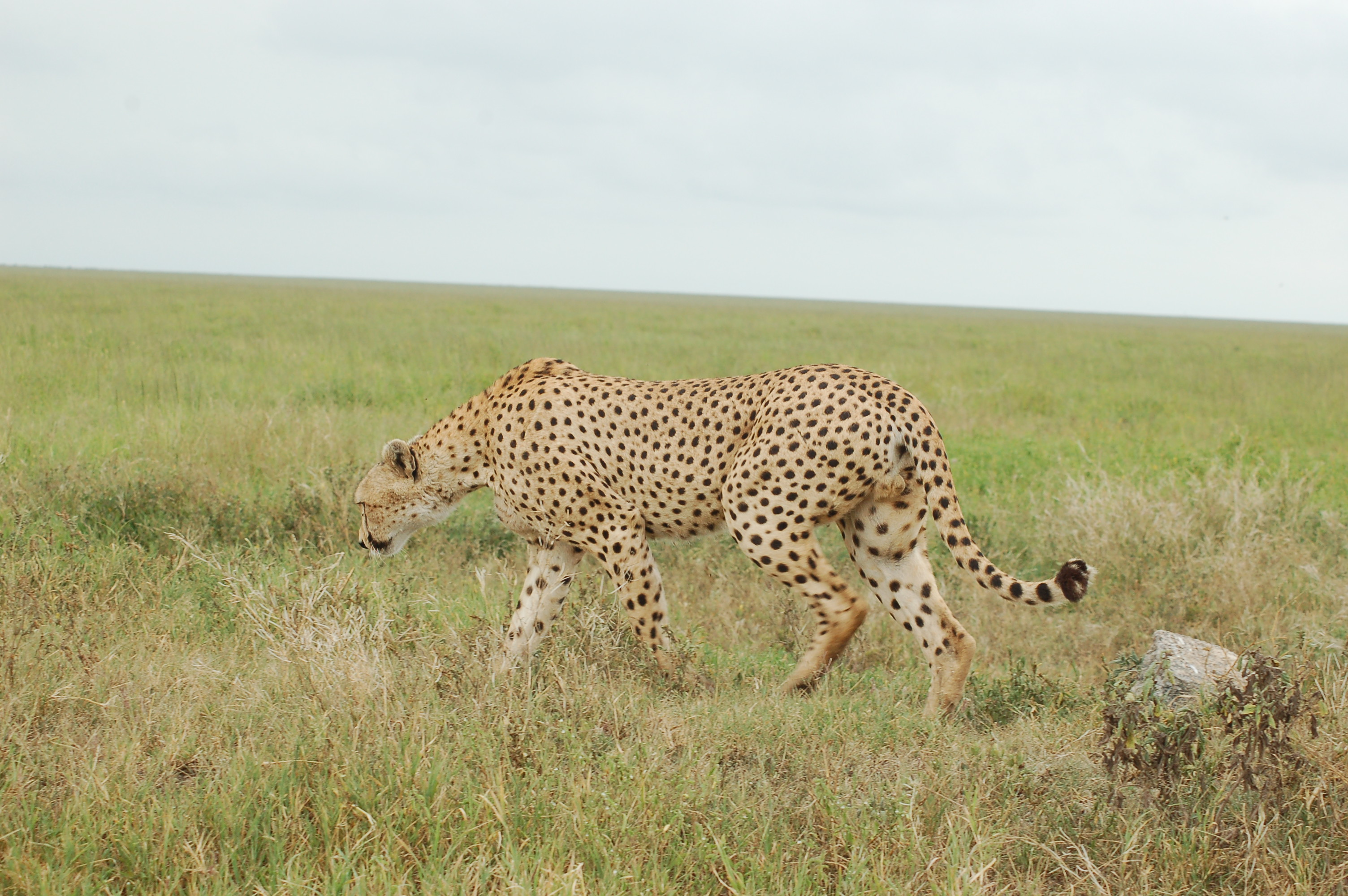
A cheetah in the Serengeti National Park, Tanzania

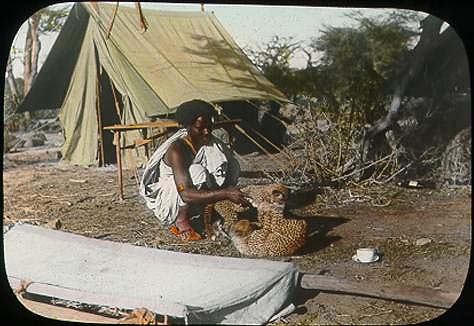
Somali man playing with two cheetah cubs in Somalia since 1896. They could either be of Tanzanian or Sudanese origin.

In East Africa, cheetahs primarily live on scrub forests, grasslands, savannahs, open fields, steppes and arid environments where preys are available, in which are suitable to be the cheetahs' main hunting grounds. A few can also be found at lakeshores and coastal areas, including mountain ranges. The cheetahs of Amboseli National Park also live in arid deserts of Nyiri.

The cheetah's range has the highest density mostly in between northern Tanzania and southern Kenya. The largest populations are mostly found at the Serengeti National Park, the Masai Mara National Reserve, Kora National Park and the Ngorongoro Crater from Tanzania and Kenya, as there were between 569 and 1,007 cheetahs in Tanzania and between 710 and 793 individuals in Kenya. In 2015, it is estimated that between 800 and 1,200 adult cheetahs reside in Kenya, making the country the main stronghold for the vulnerable species in East Africa. There are rare sightings of cheetahs at the Ngorongoro Conservation Area and in the Katavi National Park from southwest Tanzania.

Populations were estimated at around 40 to 295 cheetahs in Uganda as of 2007. Cheetahs are resident in Kidepo Valley National Park in northern Uganda. It is estimated that only 20 individuals live in Kidepo since 2014.

=== Former ranges ===
The East African cheetah has lost most of its historical range, such as in the North Kivu and South Kivu provinces of the Democratic Republic of the Congo, and in Virunga National Park. It might share borders with the Northeast African cheetah in Northeast Africa. It is regionally extinct in Rwanda and Burundi.

== Ecology and behavior ==
=== Reproduction and life cycle ===
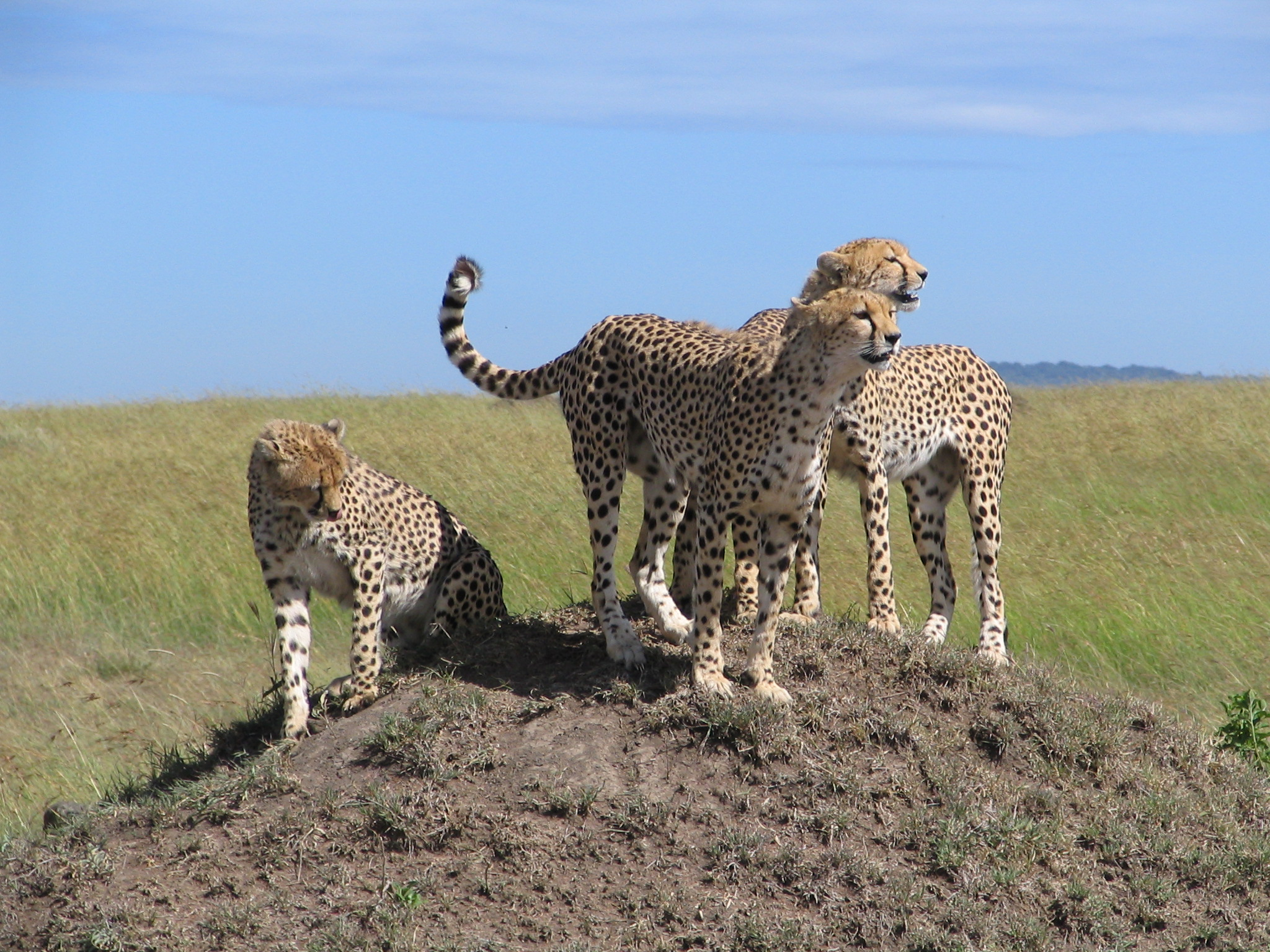
Three young cheetahs in Maasai Mara, Kenya

Male cheetahs are sociable and often live in a group of other males called coalitions. In the Serengeti, it was found that 41% of the adult males were solitary, 40% lived in pairs and 19% lived in trios. Male cheetahs are territorial, and establish their territories by marking their territories by urinating on trees or logs.

The female cheetah's home ranges can be very large and a territory including several females' ranges is impossible to defend. Instead, males choose the points at which several of the females' home ranges overlap, creating a much smaller space, which can be properly defended against intruders while maximizing the chance of reproduction. Coalitions will try their best to maintain territories to find females with whom they will mate. The size of the territory also depends on the available resources; depending on the habitat, the size of a male's territory can vary greatly from 37 to 160 km^{2} (14 to 62 sq mi).

Female cheetahs can reproduce at 13 to 16 months of age with an average age of sexual maturity between 21 and 22 months. Cheetah cub births mostly occurs during January to August in East Africa after 90 to 95 days of gestation.

=== Hunting and diet ===
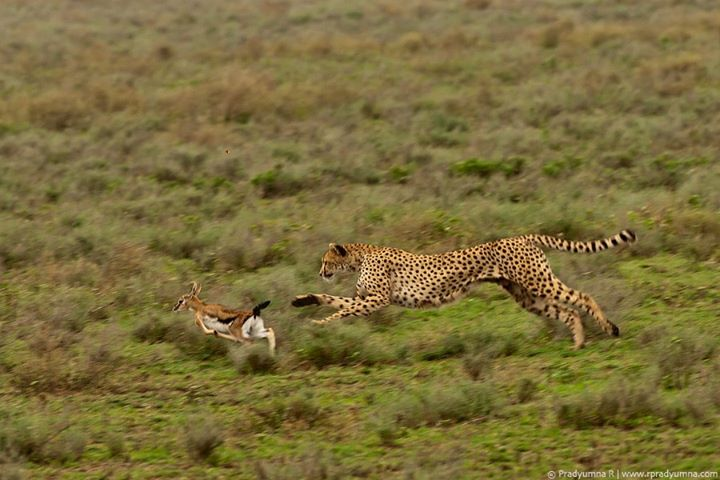
A cheetah hunting a Thomson's gazelle

Cheetahs are diurnal animals (active mainly during the day), whereas the stronger apex predators, such as hyenas, African leopards and lions are nocturnal (active mainly at night). Hunting is the major activity throughout the day; peaks are observed during dawn and dusk indicating crepuscular tendencies. Groups rest in grassy clearings after dusk, though males and juveniles often roam around at night.

In Kenya, cheetahs of the Masai Mara hunt after sunset to escape the high temperatures of the day. In the Serengeti, they hunt when the lions and hyenas are inactive. A study in Nairobi National Park showed that the success of cheetah hunt depends on the species, age, sex, and habitat of the prey, and the size of the hunting herd or the efficiency of the hunting individual.

It usually eats medium-sized or large mammalian herbivores, such as antelopes. It preys on impala, Grant's gazelle, gerenuk, wildebeest, waterbuck, hare and guineafowl. It even feeds on other large mammals, such as plains zebras and ostriches on few occasions. Its favorite prey is the Thomson's gazelle. The gazelle is found mostly in savannas, grasslands and open fields of the Serengeti ecosystem of Tanzania and the Masai Mara ecosystem of Kenya, where the cheetah can chase and catch its prey at full speed.

In Somalia, cheetahs feed on Soemmerring's gazelles. Historically, Speke's gazelles fell prey to the cheetahs, which were formerly the main prey of the cheetahs in semi-deserts and grass steppes of the Horn of Africa. It suffers from population decline and habitat degradation.

=== Enemies and competitors ===
Cheetahs are threatened and outranked by larger predators in their area, as they are known to be unable to defend themselves against these predators. In the Serengeti ecosystem, they are highly threatened by East African lions, as they can kill cheetahs, cause high-rate cheetah cub mortality, also steal their food.

Other predators such as African leopards, East African wild dogs and hyenas also threaten the cheetahs. Spotted and striped hyenas frequently scavenges from the cheetah kills, and the cheetahs would surrender their meals to the incoming hyenas without a fight.

Coalitions of male adult cheetahs can chase predators away. Even a single cheetah are also known to chase jackals and African golden wolves away from their territory or their food.

== Threats ==
The cheetah is threatened by poaching, habitat loss and fragmentation. Cheetahs in the Serengeti and Maasai Mara are affected by infectious diseases, although it does not represent a major threat to the free-roaming cheetahs of East Africa.

== Conservation ==
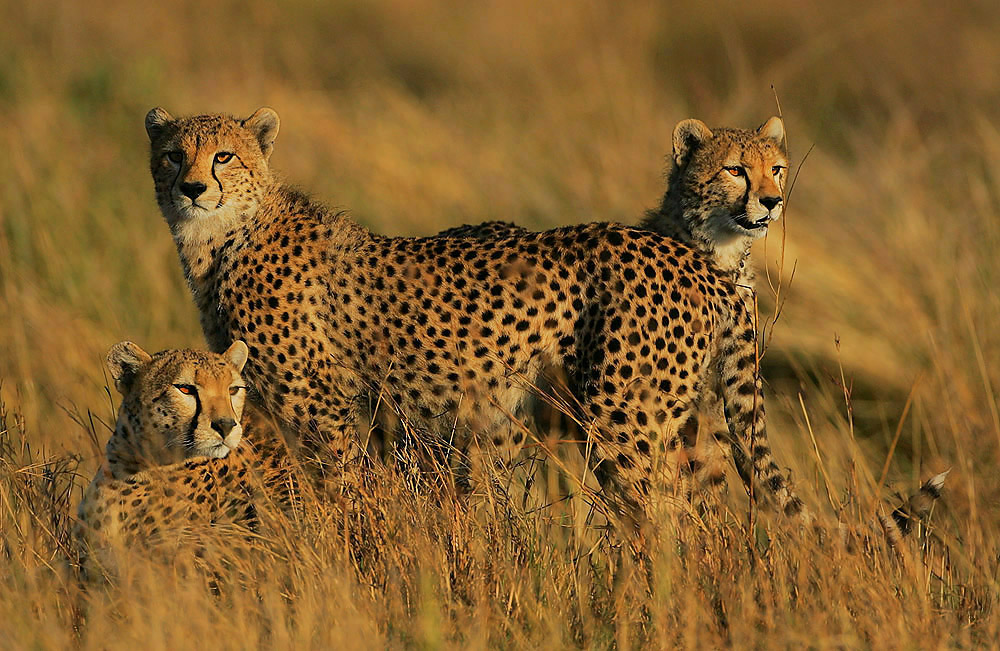
Three cheetahs at sunrise of western part of Maasai Mara, Kenya

The cheetah species is listed on Appendix I of CITES (Convention on International Trade in Endangered Species), Appendix I of CMS (Convention on the Conservation of Migratory Species of Wild Animals) and is protected under national legislation throughout most of its extant and some of its former range.

Despite the numerous reserves and national parks for the cheetah, its population still is in decline. There are various conservation projects in order to save the cheetah from extinction, such as the Mara-Meru Cheetah Project, the Serengeti Cheetah Project, Action for Cheetahs in Kenya and the Tanzania Cheetah Conservation Programme.

There are no known East African cheetahs in captivity. Whipsnade Zoo features displays that inform visitors about ZSL's cheetah conservation project in Tanzania. Despite the conservation project is involved on East Africa, the captive cheetahs of the zoo are actually Northeast African cheetahs.

== In popular culture ==
- The book The Cheetahs by Alan Caillou tells the story about an Ethiopian family raising a pair of cheetah cubs named Taitu and Amro. A 1989 film released by Disney called Cheetah is loosely based on the book, where the cheetah is a female named Duma (the Swahili word for cheetah) and is adopted by an American family.
- The book How It Was with Dooms tells the true story of a family raising an orphaned cub named Duma in Kenya. The film Duma (2005) was loosely based on this book.
- Similarly, Roger Hunt successfully tames a cheetah from the Tsavo East National Park in Willard Price's Safari Adventure, after rescuing it from an elephant pit trap. The cheetah soon befriends a German Shepherd dog called Zulu.
- André Mercier's Our Friend Yambo (1961) is a curious biography of a cheetah from Kenya adopted by a French couple and brought to live in Paris. It is seen as a French answer to Born Free (1960), whose author, Joy Adamson, produced a cheetah biography of her own, The Spotted Sphinx (1969).
- Disney's 2011 movie African Cats is about cheetahs and lions in Maasai Mara.

== Gallery ==
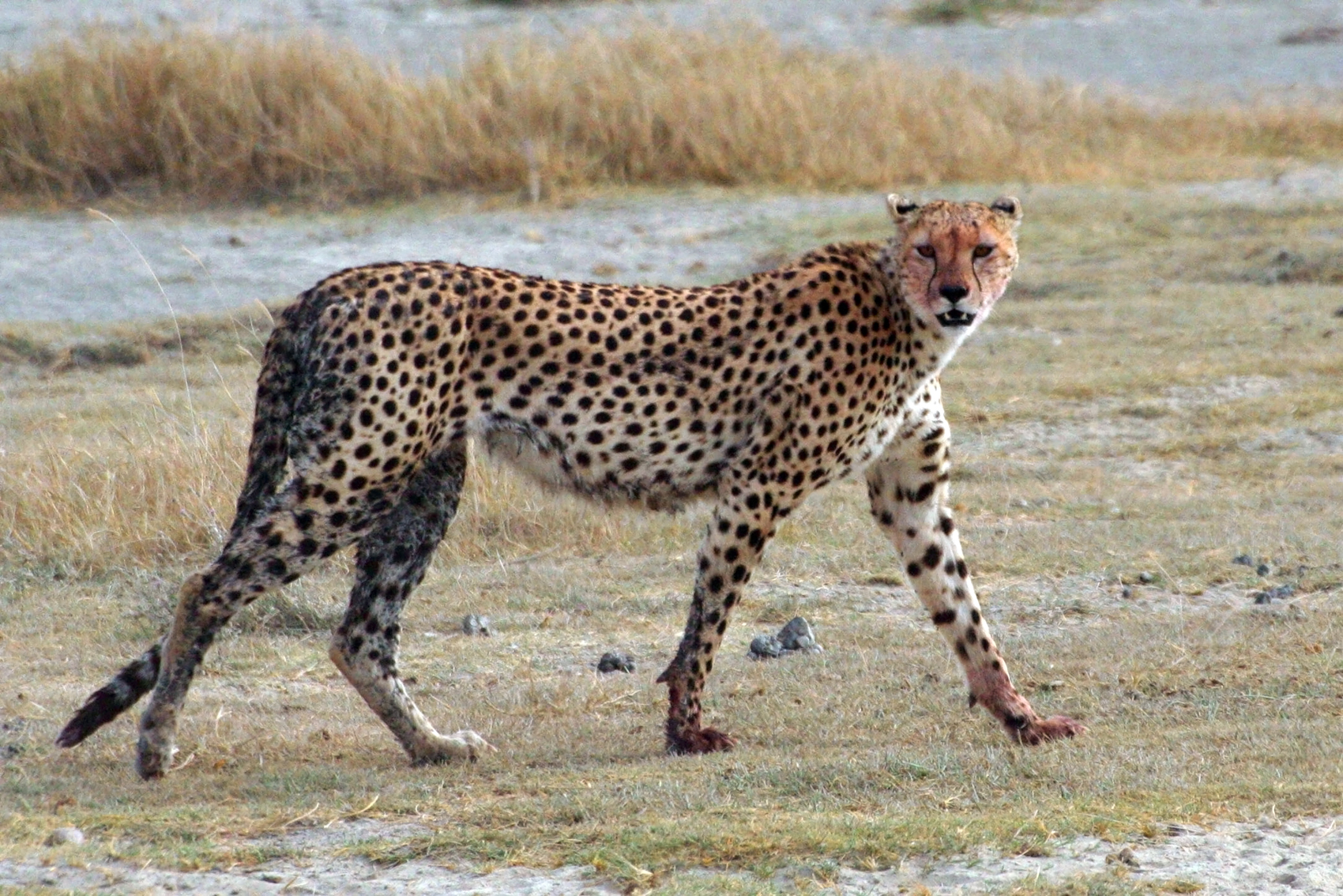
A cheetah walking in Ngorongoro Crater, Tanzania

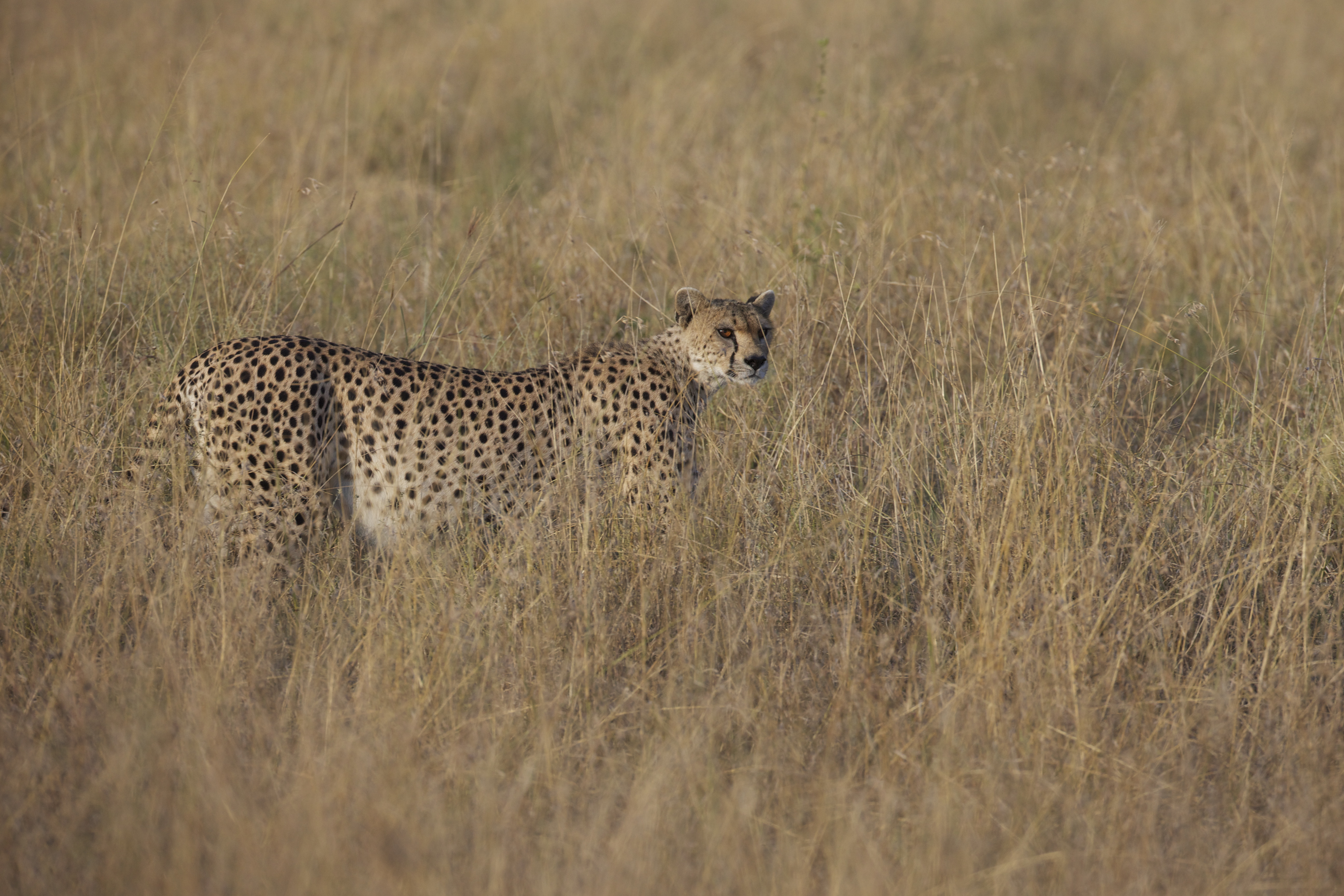
At the Serengeti National Park

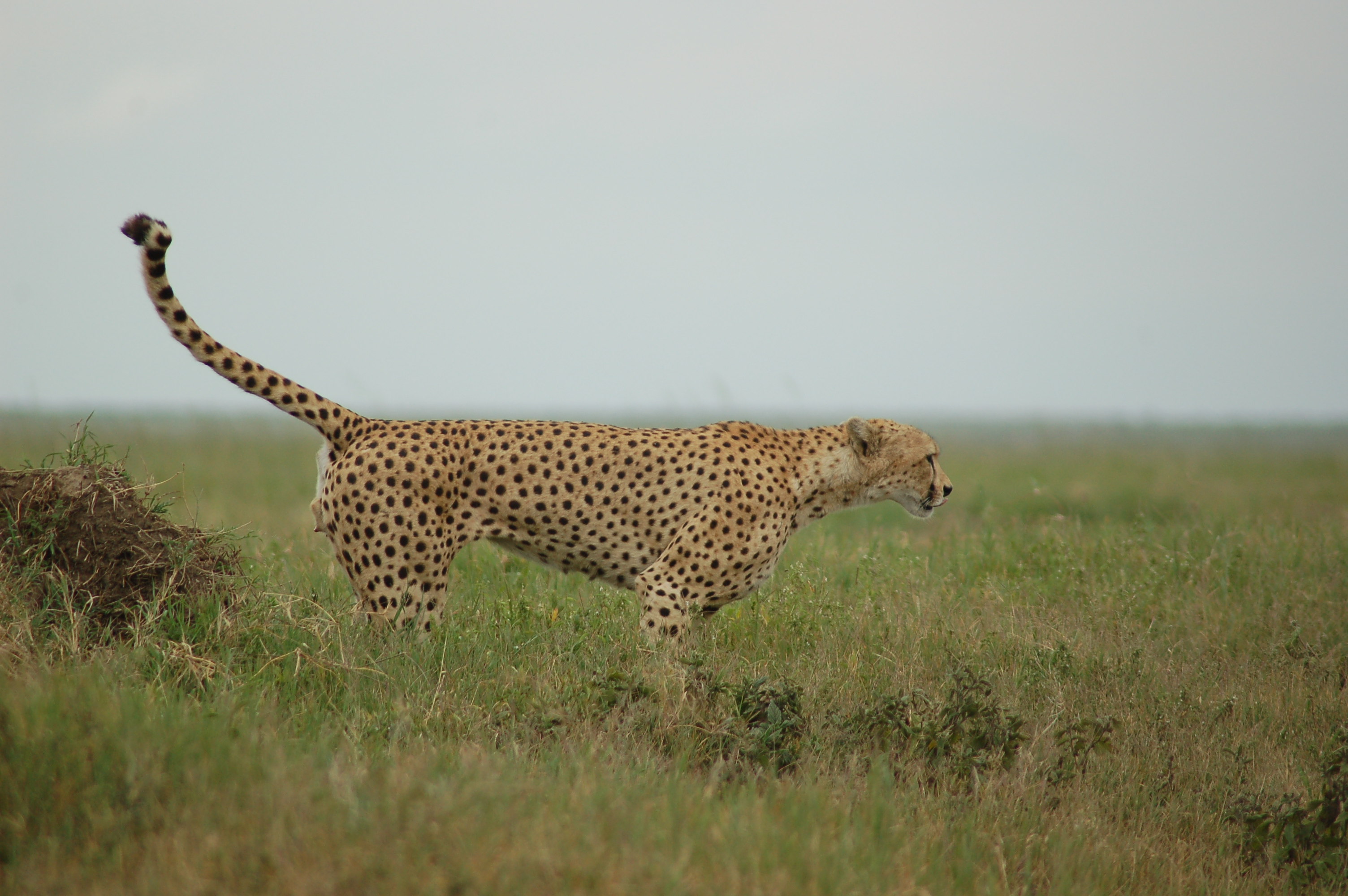
Male marking his territory in the Serengeti

== See also ==
- Asiatic cheetah
- Ruaha National Park
