= Sjambok =

South African leather whip

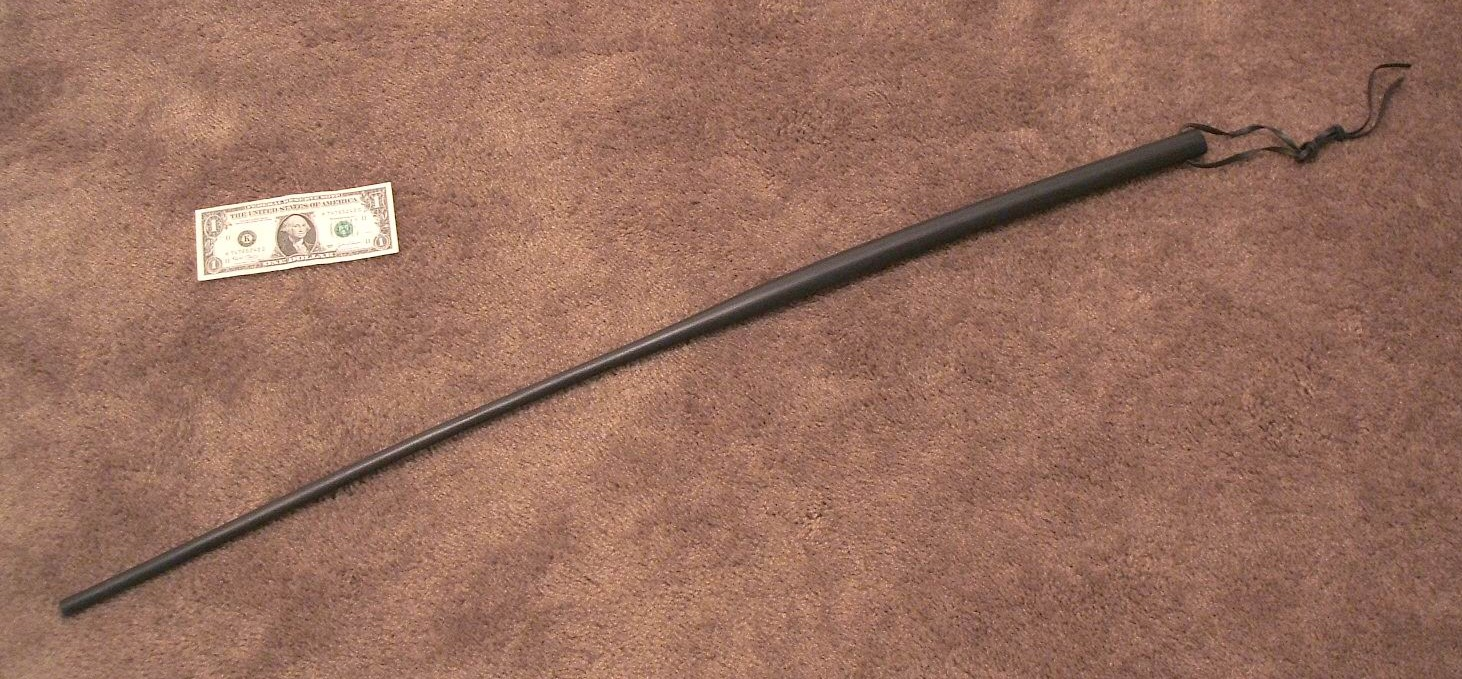
- A 90 cm (3 ft) plastic sjambok used by South African police
- Type: Whip
- Place of origin: Dutch Cape Colony (now part of South Africa)

Specifications
- Length: 90 to 150 centimetres (35 to 59 in)

The sjambok (/ˈʃæmbʌk, -bɒk/), or litupa, is a heavy leather whip. It is traditionally made from adult hippopotamus or rhinoceros hide, but it is also commonly made out of plastic.

A strip of the animal's hide is cut and carved into a strip 90 to 150 centimetres (3 to 5 ft) long, tapering from about 25 mm (1 in) thick at the handle to about 10 mm (3/8 in) at the tip. This strip is then rolled until reaching a tapered-cylindrical form. The resulting whip is both flexible and durable. A plastic version was made for the apartheid era South African Police, and used for riot control.

Peter Hathaway Capstick describes a sjambok as a short swordlike whip made from rhino pizzle leather that could lay a man open like a straight razor.

The sjambok was heavily used by the Voortrekkers driving their oxen while migrating from the Cape of Good Hope, and remains in use by herdsmen to drive cattle. They are widely available in South Africa from informal traders to regular stores from a variety of materials, lengths and thicknesses.

== Use by police ==
=== South Africa ===
In South Africa, use of the sjambok by police is sometimes seen as synonymous with the apartheid era, but its use on people started much earlier. It is sometimes used outside the official judiciary by people who carry out punishments imposed by extralegal courts. South African police officers favoured the sjambok, with the South African Police stating that they inflicted less injury compared to the wooden baton. Despite this, public perception of the sjambok was poor, both domestically and internationally. Allegations of police brutality concerning the sjambok were widespread, which eventually led to the sjambok being effectively banned for riot control in September 1989.

=== United Kingdom ===
In 1963, an enquiry into the Sheffield City Police found that rhino whips had been used on suspects.

== Other types ==
The name seems to have originated as cambuk in Indonesia, where it was the name of a wooden rod for punishing slaves, where it was possibly derived from the Persian chabouk or chabuk. When Malay slaves arrived in South Africa in the 17th and 18th centuries, the instrument and its name were imported with them, the material was changed to hide, and the name was finally incorporated into Afrikaans, spelled as sambok. It is known in Bengali as chabuk.

In the Congo Free State, where it was called the chicotte, the whip was notoriously used to terrorise native labourers and countless other civilians, including children. It was mainly used as an instrument of torture and mutilation by the Force Publique, the primarily-native military that was used to suppress native dissent and uphold colonial rule. After 1908, when the Congo Free State was dissolved in the wake of international outcry at the widespread human rights abuses, the new Belgian administration made some effort to reform the colony, but the chicotte remained widely used. It was only formally prohibited in 1960, upon Democratic Congolese independence.

The instrument is also known as imvubu (hippopotamus in Zulu), kiboko (hippopotamus in Swahili) and as mnigolo (hippopotamus in Malinké). In the Portuguese African colonies, it was called a chicote, from the Portuguese word for whip, and whence the French chicotte derived, or fimbo and was used to discipline indigenous labourers, leading to life-long mutilation and often death. The official tariff for punishment in this case was lowered in time from twenty strokes to eight, then (in 1949) six, and progressively four and two, until flogging was outlawed completely in 1955.

In north Africa, particularly Egypt, the whip was called a kurbash, Arabic for whip. The term shaabuug is used in the Somali language; it can also refer to a generic leather whip.

== Cultural depictions ==
The novel The Grass Is Singing by Doris Lessing describes how sjamboks were used by white farmers in Southern Rhodesia as a symbol of authority and to physically subdue the native workers.

In Willard Price's Elephant Adventure, the cruel Arab slaver known as the Thunder Man enjoys flogging captives with a sjambok made from hippopotamus hide.

In the novel V. by Thomas Pynchon the Sjambok is a major feature in the narrative of the Herero Wars, where it serves as a symbol for the violence and sexual perversion of the German and European colonizers.

In the film Would You Rather, players are given the option to stab a fellow contestant with an ice pick or whip another contestant with a sjambok.
