= Duma (2005 film) =

2005 American adventure film

- Theatrical release poster
- Directed by: Carroll Ballard
- Written by: Karen Janszen; Mark St. Germain
- Story by: Carol Flint; Karen Janszen
- Based on: How It Was with Dooms by Carol Cawthra Hopcraft and Xan Hopcraft
- Produced by: John Wells; Hunt Lowry; E.K. Gaylord II; Kristin Harms; Stacy Cohen
- Starring: Alexander Michaletos; Eamonn Walker; Campbell Scott; Hope Davis
- Narrated by: Alexander Michaletos
- Cinematography: Werner Maritz
- Edited by: T.M. Christopher
- Music by: George Acogny; John Debney
- Production companies: Gaylord Films; John Wells Productions
- Distributed by: Warner Bros. Pictures
- Release date: September 30, 2005
- Running time: 100 minutes
- Countries: United States; South Africa
- Language: English
- Budget: $12 million
- Box office: $994,790 (worldwide)

Duma is a 2005 American family drama adventure film about a young South African boy's friendship with an orphaned cheetah, based on How It Was with Dooms by Carol Cawthra Hopcraft and Xan Hopcraft. It was directed by Carroll Ballard and stars Alexander Michaletos in his only film role, Eamonn Walker, Campbell Scott and Hope Davis. This was Carroll Ballard's final film before his retirement.

The film was theatrically released on April 22, 2005, by Warner Bros. Pictures, Gaylord Films and John Wells Productions. The film received mostly positive reviews from critics, but Warner Bros. only gave the film a small release around the world (including a limited theatrical release in the US), resulting in earning $994,790 in worldwide box office. The film won the Family Feature Film at the Genesis Awards in 2006.

== Plot ==
Set in the country of South Africa, the story begins with a cheetah cub being orphaned after his mother was killed by lions. The cub is found on the side of the road by a young boy named Xan (Alexander Michaeletos) and his father Peter (Campbell Scott). Initially reluctant to take in a wild animal, Peter agrees to let Xan take care of the cub. They name him "Duma", the Swahili name for cheetah. Over the years, Duma becomes a part of the family, being closely raised by Xan. As he nears adulthood, Peter and Xan decide to teach Duma how to run by having him chase alongside Peter's motorcycle, which can barely keep up with him. But with Duma almost fully grown, to Xan's dismay, his father tells him that it is time to take his friend to his real home before he grows too old to survive in his native habitat. His father says to Xan, "Duma has to live the life he was born to—or he'll never be fully alive."

Xan reluctantly agrees, but their plans are put on hold when his father suddenly falls ill and dies and Xan and his mother (Hope Davis) must move to Johannesburg. Duma comes with them, which wreaks havoc on their life in the city. Xan's aunt is terrified of Duma, who likes to sneak up and surprise her, and when Duma escapes and pays a disastrous visit to Xan's school, the two of them must flee the city to keep Duma from being put into captivity. Not knowing where to go, Xan gets an idea—he'll carry out the plan his dad had outlined, taking Duma home in the neighboring country of Botswana, over the scorching Makgadikgadi Salt Pans, through the Okavango Delta and into the Erongo Mountains.

Xan begins to drive to his destination in his father's old motorcycle, with Duma in the sidecar. After running out of fuel and water in the grasslands, they find some shade underneath a crashed airplane. There, they are confronted by Ripkuna (Eamonn Walker), a mysterious drifter on a journey of his own. While Xan isn't at all that sure he can trust Rip, he agrees to go with him. Xan manages to turn the immobile motorcycle into a desert sailboat out of a parachute from the plane wreck. The trio make their way until they encounter the untraversable scrub brush of the Kalahari Desert and must abandon the motorcycle. While trying to find shelter, Rip is trapped in an abandoned diamond mine by a cave in, and Xan decides to leave him, as he suspects that he has been leading him to town instead of the jungle to sell Duma and collect a reward for finding him. However, when Duma is caught in a trap and Xan is knocked unconscious by a boar, Rip rescues both of them, having escaped the mine through a ventilation shaft.

Soon, they reach the Okavango Delta, where Xan is attacked by the deadly wildlife and the churning rapids of the Thamalakane River, but it's too late for him to turn back now. Xan, Rip and Duma press through the Okavango, and finally the Erongo Mountains, on the border of Botswana and Namibia are in sight. However, once they get there, Xan is suddenly set upon by a swarm of tsetse flies. To protect him from their lethal bite, Rip huddles over Xan and is bitten by hundreds of flies. He soon develops sleeping sickness, and Xan takes him to a nearby village where he can be cared for; it is soon revealed that those taking care of him are actually his own family. Later that night, outside the village, Duma is out on his own and starts calling out into the mountains. Duma finds another cheetah calling to him, and they bond rather quickly. It is never explained whether this is another male cheetah, or is in fact one of Duma's siblings. Xan hears this activity, and realizes that this is where he and Duma must part. Xan says goodbye to Duma, and Duma comes to Xan and says a final goodbye, and goes back to play with his new friend. Xan returns to Rip in the village. Before the credits, it shows Xan being reunited with his mother.

== Cast ==
- Alexander Michaeletos as Xan
- Anthony, Azaro, Nikita, Sasha and Savannah as Duma
- Eamonn Walker as Ripkuna
- Campbell Scott as Peter
- Hope Davis as Kristin
- Mary Makhatho as Thandi
- Nthabiseng Kenoshi as Lucille
- Jennifer Steyn as Aunt Gwen
- Nicky Rebelo as Coach Nagy
- Garth Renecle as Hock Bender
- André Stolz as Xan's Teacher
- Charlotte Savage as Poetry Student
- Ronald Shange as Policeman
- Nadia Kretschmer as Tourist #1
- John Whiteley as Tourist #2
- Clive Scott as Tourist #3 (Eager Man)
- Catriona Andrew as Tourist #4 (Beautiful Woman)
- Errol Ballentine as White Haired Doctor
- Michele Levin as Doctor's Wife
- Sam Ngakane as Old Man in Village
- Adelaide Shabalala as Medicine Woman, Suliwa
- Thokozani Ndaba as Rip's Wife, Melika
- Wright Ngubeni as Rip's Son
- Bernard Msimang as Rip's Father
- Ivy Nkutha as Rip's Mother
- Sheba as Young Duma

== Production ==
On August 5, 2002, it was announced that Carroll Ballard was hired and set to direct Duma based on How It Was with Dooms by Carol Cawthra Hopcraft and Xan Hopcraft. Karen Janszen and Mark St. Germain wrote the script for the film. Stacy Cohen, E.K. Gaylord II, Kristin Harms, Hunt Lowry and John Wells produced the film with the budget of $12 million for release in 2005. On September 7, 2003, it was announced that Alexander Michaletos, Eamonn Walker, Campbell Scott and Hope Davis joined the film. On January 2, 2004, it was announced that John Debney would compose the music for the film. The final score was co-composed by John Debney and George Acogny.

Filming of the film was completed in Botswana and South Africa. On 11 January, Warner Bros. Pictures, Gaylord Films and C.O.R.E. acquired distribution rights to the film. The film was shot mostly in South Africa, though some of the film is set in neighbouring Botswana. One of the five cheetahs that stars in the film resided in Kragga Kamma Game Park in Port Elizabeth, Eastern Cape, South Africa until its death in November 2011. There were five adult cheetahs: Anthony, Azaro, Nikita, Sasha, and Savannah, along with one Cheetah cub: Sheba. Duma is played by six different cheetahs. All orphaned or poached cheetahs themselves, they were hand-raised in different parts of Africa.

== Music ==
George Acogny and John Debney scored the music for the film. The film's soundtrack also contains “Rhaliweni (Railway)” performed by Sun Glen, “Share It With Me” written and performed by Ayub Ogada and Ishmael Pamphille, “A Cup of Coffee, a Sandwich and You” written by Joseph Meyer, Billy Rose and Al Dubin, “Breakfast” written by Carl Stalling, “Kaboyi, Kaboyi (Woodpecker)” performed by Nana, “Just Having a Party” performed by the Fabulous Fantoms, “Umlolozelo A Lullaby” performed by Neo Muyanga and Brother Clement Sithole, “When You're Falling” performed by Afro Celt Sound System (as The Afro Celt Sound System) with Peter Gabriel and “Into the Light” performed by the World Beaters and Ayub Ogada.

=== Soundtrack ===
Duma (Original Motion Picture Soundtrack)

Film score / Soundtrack album by Various artists, George Acogny and John Debney
- Released: November 8, 2005
- Recorded: 2005
- Genres: Film score Soundtrack album
- Length: 40:46
- Label: Varèse Sarabande
- Producers: Various artists George Acogny; John Debney

George Acogny and John Debney film scores chronology
Playing for Keeps (1986)	Duma (Original Motion Picture Soundtrack) (2005)	Deuce Bigalow: European Gigolo (2005)

Singles from Duma (Original Motion Picture Soundtrack)
- 1. "Kaboyi, Kaboyi (Woodpecker)" Released: 2005

Duma (Original Motion Picture Soundtrack) is the film's soundtrack album and film score made by Various artists, George Acogny and John Debney and it was released on November 8, 2005, by Varèse Sarabande. None of the first 9 songs below are on the Varese Sarabande release. The score features the wailing woman motif.

==== Soundtrack list ====
- Rhaliweni (Railway) - Performed by Sun Glen
- Share It With Me - Written and Performed by Ayub Ogada and Ishmael Pamphille
- A Cup of Coffee, a Sandwich and You - Written by Joseph Meyer, Billy Rose and Al Dubin
- Breakfast - Written by Carl Stalling
- Kaboyi, Kaboyi (Woodpecker) - Performed by Nana
- Just Having a Party - Performed by the Fabulous Fantoms
- Umlolozelo a Lullaby - Performed by Neo Muyanga and Brother Clement Sithole
- When You're Falling - Performed by Afro Celt Sound System (as The Afro Celt Sound System) with Peter Gabriel
- Into The Light - Performed by the World Beaters and Ayub Ogada
- Phiry - The Bird Songs
- Duma Orphaned
- Cute Kitten Montage
- Dad Sick
- Move to City
- At School
- Coming Home
- Pushing Motorcycle
- Land Yacht
- Leaving Rip
- Duma Sees Crocs
- Land Yacht Remix
- Croc River
- Change
- Freedom
- Goodnight
- Run to Village
- Xan and Duma Say *Goodbye
- Issa Lullaby

== Release ==
Duma had tested badly and Warner Bros. planned to not release this film in the United States theatrically, but Scott Foundas wrote a rave review for the film in Variety and it led Warner Bros to reconsider. Warner Bros. finally gave Duma an official limited theatrical release in the US after producer John Wells agreed to pay part of the US marketing cost.

Duma was released on DVD on May 16, 2006, by Warner Home Video.

== Reception ==
=== Critical response ===
Duma went on receiving very positive reviews from critics; the review aggregator Rotten Tomatoes reported that 95% of critics gave the film positive reviews, based on 61 reviews; Metacritic reported the film had an average score of 82 out of 100, based on 21 reviews.

=== Box office ===
The film made $870,067 at the North American box office and $124,723 in other territories, making its worldwide box office total $994,790.

=== Awards ===
Award	Category	Nominee
Genesis Award	Family Feature Film	Won
