= Amazon Adventure =

Novel by Willard Price

- First US edition cover
- Author: Willard Price
- Language: English
- Series: Willard Price's Adventure series
- Genre: Young adult Adventure novel
- Publisher: John Day (US)
- Publication date: 1949
- Followed by: South Sea Adventure

Amazon Adventure is a 1949 children's novel by the Canadian-American author Willard Price featuring his "Adventure" series characters, Hal and Roger Hunt. It depicts an expedition to the Amazon River to capture animals for their father's wildlife collection business. Initially published by John Day in the US, the UK edition was published two years later by Jonathan Cape.

== Allies ==
- Terry- The smiling Irish pilot who flies the Hunts from Quito to the Jívaro village. Terry's plane is in terrible condition, and the flight almost ends in disaster on several occasions. Hal decides that "Lady Luck must love this man!"
- Chief- The Chief of the Jívaro village is friendly towards the Hunts, and is eventually persuaded to sell them the mummified head of a warrior, for which John Hunt pays double the requested price. The Chief also organises for Napo to accompany the trio down the uncharted Pastaza River.
- Napo - The Jivaro warrior who accompanies Hal, Roger and John Hunt down the first segment of the Pastaza River. The waterfall at which he turns back is consequently dubbed Napo Falls.
- Aqua - A young Indian whom Hal employed at Iquitos, who is always willing to do more than he was asked to do. He was killed by the anaconda while bravely helping to capture it, and was buried at the foot of the tree where he gave his life.

== Enemies ==
- "Shark" Sands- An unseen character, Sands is a rival animal collector. His nickname, "Shark," was given because he used to do some sharking in the South Seas. Reputedly, he narrowly escaped a murder charge in the Philippines, and has recently purchased the second-largest animal collection business, behind John Hunt's. Having little knowledge of wildlife, Hal suspects that Sands is using foul means to achieve success. It is believed that Sands started the fire that destroyed the Hunt property on Long Island, destroying his entire animal collection, forcing John Hunt to return home. Hal also suspects that Sands hired the man named Croc to sabotage their expedition. What ultimately happened to him is unknown.
- Croc- Hal suspects that "Croc" was hired by the rival animal collector "Shark" Sands to sabotage their expedition. Hal nicknames him Croc because his teeth are "snaggled and discoloured like a crocodile's." Hal first notices Croc following him in Quito, and again sees him at Iquitos. When Croc's hired thugs are beheaded by Cocamas Indians, Hal decides to help him, and Croc steals their boat and deserts them, leaving them to die beside the Amazon River. By boarding a floating island of land, Hal and Roger eventually catch up with Croc, overpower him and lock him in the anaconda cage. On their arrival in Manaos, the police arrest Croc for robbery and incendiarism, and for the murder of twelve Indians.
- Banco- A 'caboclo,' or a mixture of Indian and Portuguese, Banco is hired by Hal at Iquitos to help with capturing animals. A stubborn coward, Banco often does not do what he is told, and his foolish actions botch an attempt to capture a jaguar, resulting in the magnificent animal's death. Shortly after the brave Indian Aqua is killed by an anaconda, Banco convinces the other Indians to flee during the night with one of the boats.

== Reception ==
Dorothy Hinman, reviewing the book for Elementary English in February 1950, wrote:

The authentic experiences presented by Willard Price in this account of a trip through the Amazon jungle in themselves would offer to an adult sufficient excitement. The author's addition of the mystery and his too free use of coincidence to extricate the characters from every predicament of danger make most of the story unconvincing [...] But for the upper-grade boy ‒ the more excitement, danger, and mystery the better. He will likely judge this a rousing good adventure story.

English author Anthony McGowan, who revived the Adventure series in 2012, has cited Amazon Adventure as the series' best entry "from a literary point of view".

== Analysis ==
Timothy Gaynor has criticised Willard Price's depiction of the Amazon, writing that Price "exaggerates the perils posed by the Amazonian fauna to an absurdly hyperbolic degree. In this text the Amazon is a phantasmagoria of man-eating piranhas and anacondas that lie in wait to devour the hapless adventurers. Needless to say, the resourceful boy heroes see their way through this challenge while their "native" manservants perish horribly." Referencing the passage where the Hunts purchase a shrunken head for museum display, Sandra Pannell notes the novel's "themes of collecting and cultural hegemony, appropriation and aesthetization".

== Animals captured ==
Animals captured in Amazon Adventure
Species	Name	Details
Iguana		Lured onto the boys' boat by Roger's singing
Anaconda		The brave Indian Aqua was killed while attempting to capture this snake
Boa constrictor		Several dozen baby boa constrictors were also acquired when the captured mother gave birth
Tapir	Nosey	Nosey's mother was shot down while attacking the Hunts' camp
Vampire bat	Vamp	Roger is given the task of regularly providing fresh blood for the bat, usually from a capybara
Marmoset	Specs	
Jabiru	Stilts	Captured when it tried to raid the boys' fish stocks.
Wood ibis		This bird was eaten when an anaconda boarded the boat and smashed open the cage
Basilisk		The enthusiastic Indian Aqua captured this lizard
Electric eel		Was captured while the boys were on the floating island. The electric eel is used to overpower Croc once they catch up with their boat
Giant anteater		One giant anteater was killed during a capture attempt, but a second was captured safely
Sloth		
Armadillo		
Amazon deer		Was used as bait to lure the anaconda, but survived the ordeal
Two jaguars		Includes one very rare black jaguar, which was captured using "bird-lime."
