= Wailing =

Wailing may refer to:

- A heavy form of crying, usually accompanied by sobbing (see also weeping (disambiguation))
- Western Wall, ancient limestone wall in the Old City of Jerusalem
- Murder Obsession, a 1981 Italian film also known as The Wailing
- The Wailing (2016 film), a South Korean film
- The Wailing (2024 film), a Spanish-French-Argentine horror film
- Wailing, a 1956 album by Buddy Arnold
- The wailing woman, a solo vocal effect used in film and television soundtracks
