= Sea adventure =

Sea adventure could refer to:

- Adventure of the Seas
- South Seas Adventure
- South Sea Adventure
