= Mountains of the Moon (Africa) =

Legendary mountain range in east Africa

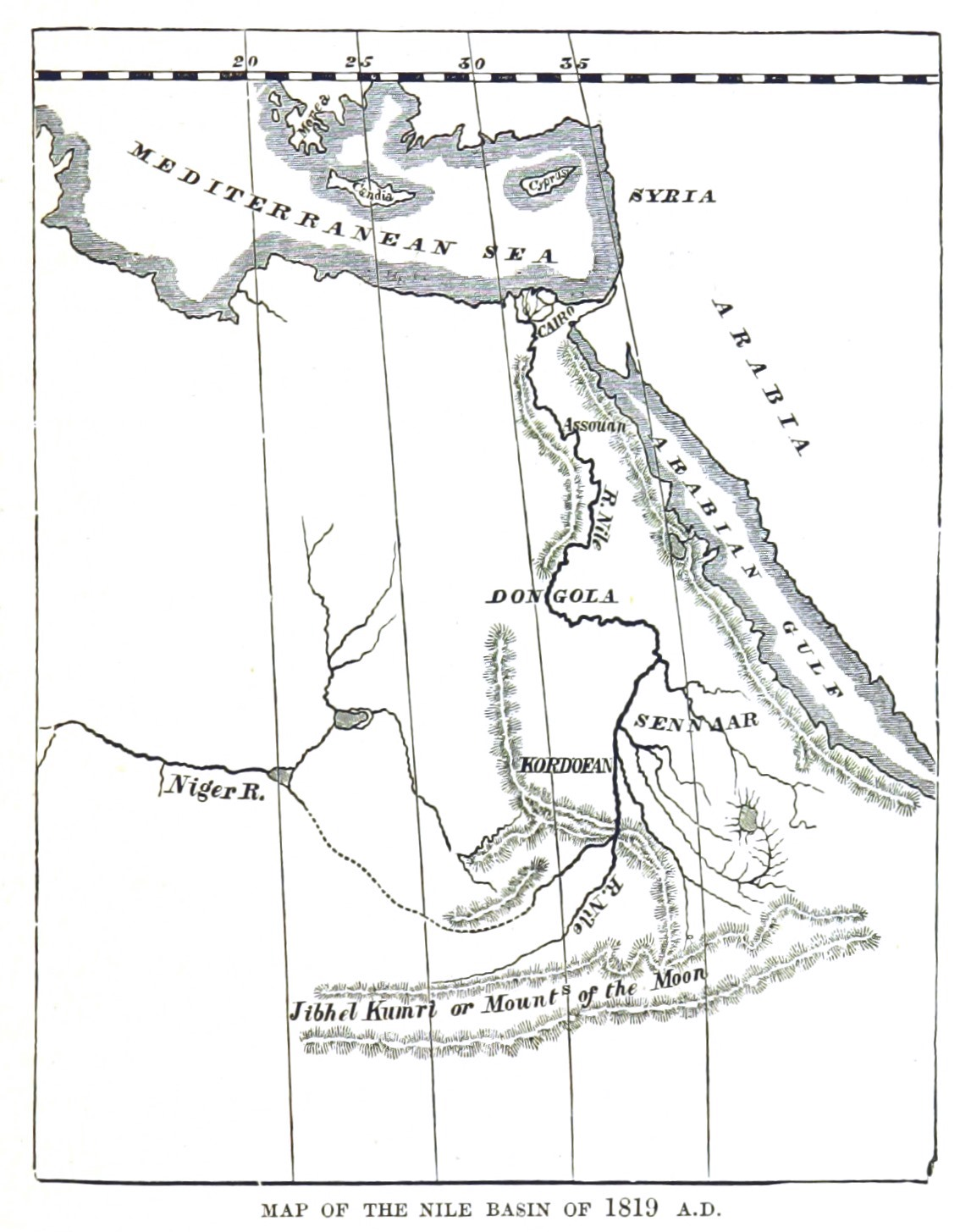
Jibhel Kumri or Mountains of the Moon as conceived in 1819

The Mountains of the Moon (Latin: Montes Lunae; Arabic: جبال القمر, Jibālu al-Qamar or Jibbel el Kumri) are a legendary mountain or mountain range in east Africa at the source of the Nile River. Various identifications have been made in modern times, the Rwenzori Mountains of Uganda and the Democratic Republic of the Congo being the most celebrated.

== Ancient testimony ==
People of the ancient world—especially geographers from ancient Greece—were long curious about the source of the Nile. A number of expeditions up the Nile failed to find the source.

Eventually, a merchant named Diogenes reported that he had traveled inland from Rhapta in East Africa for twenty-five days and had found the source of the Nile. He reported that it flowed from a group of massive mountains into a series of large lakes. He reported the natives called this range the Mountains of the Moon because of their snow-capped whiteness. These reports were accepted as true by most Greek and Roman geographers, most notably by Ptolemy, who produced maps that indicated the reported location of the mountains.

Late Arab geographers, despite having far more knowledge of Africa, also presumed the report was fact, and included the mountains in the same location given by Ptolemy.

== Modern identifications ==
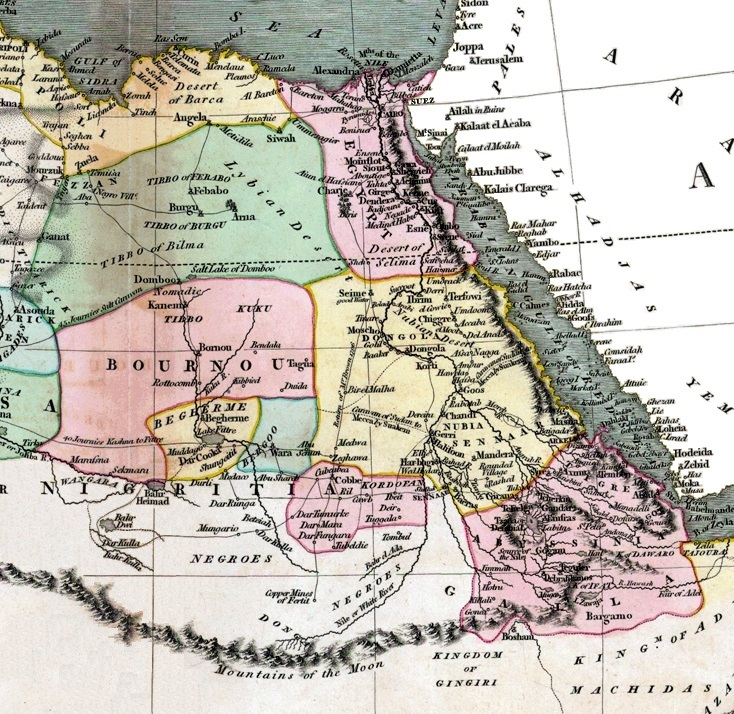
A map of Africa, published by John Cary in 1805, showing the Mountains of the Moon

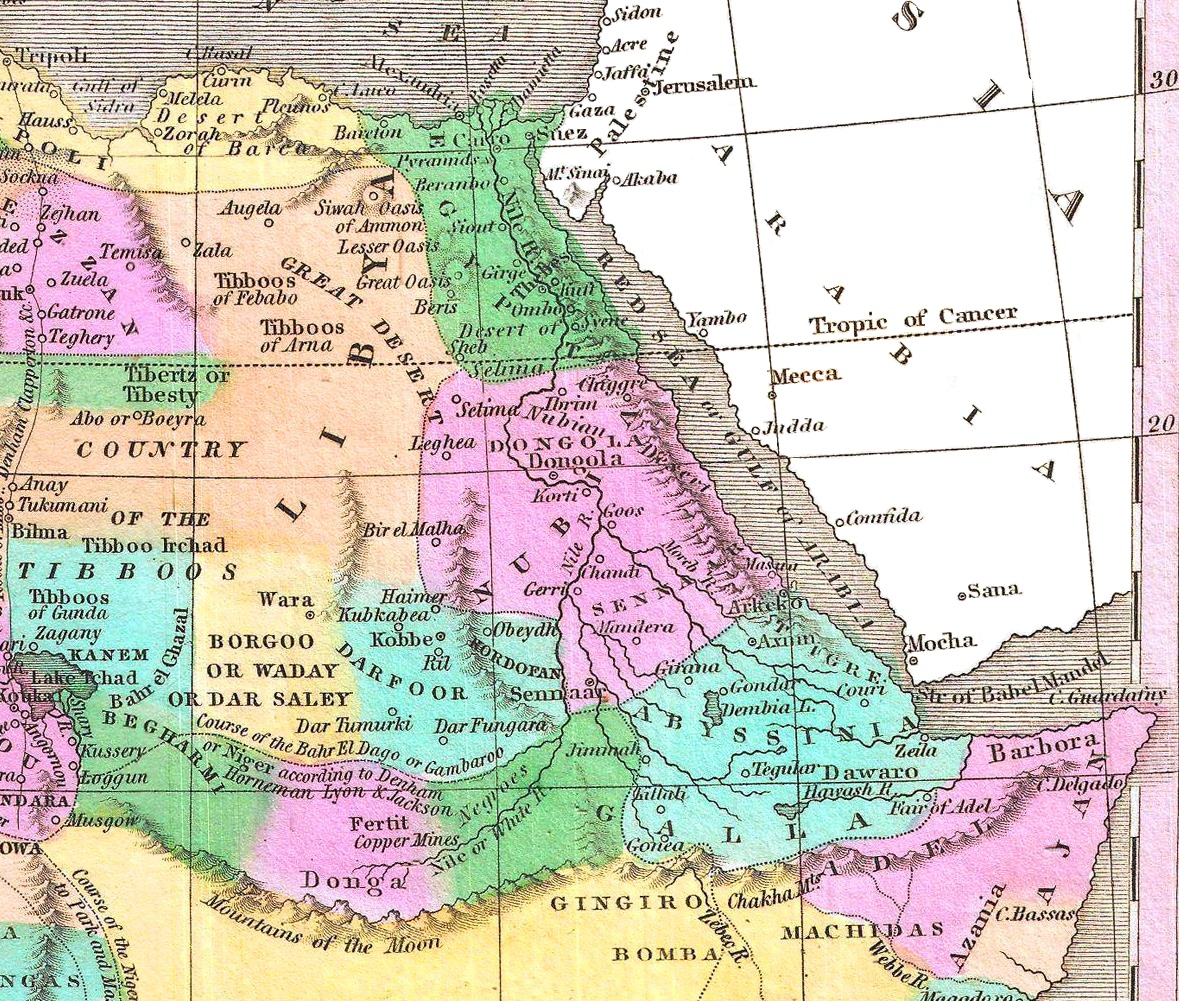
Anthony Finley's map of 1827 owes much to that of Cary, once again depicting the Mountains of the Moon as the source of the White Nile.

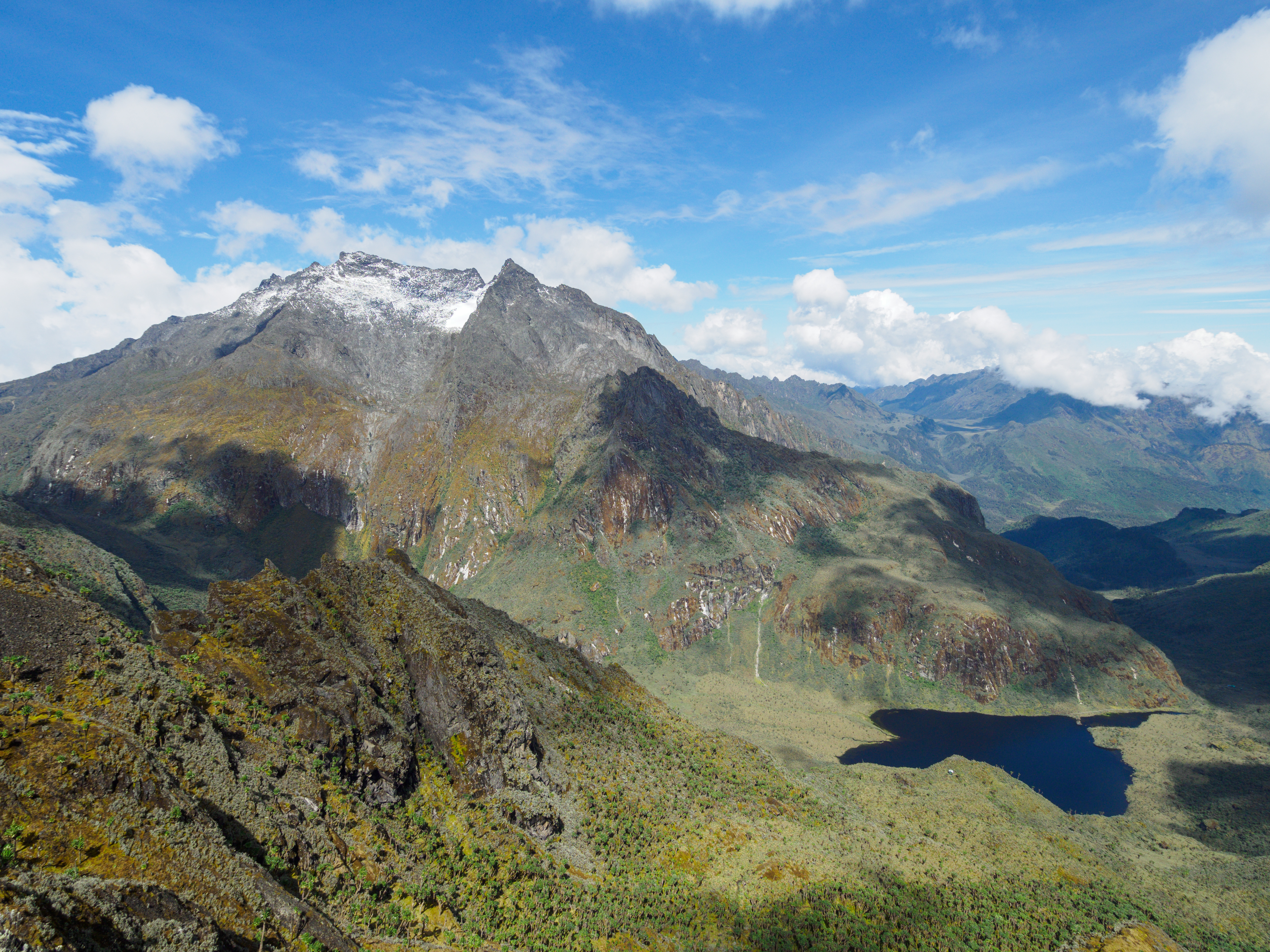
Rwenzori Mountains

It was not until modern times that Europeans resumed their search for the source of the Nile. The Scottish explorer James Bruce, who travelled to Gojjam, Ethiopia, in 1770, investigated the source of the Blue Nile there. He identified the "Mountains of the Moon" with Mount Amedamit, which he described surrounding the source of the Lesser Abay "in two semi-circles like a new moon ... and seem, by their shape, to deserve the name of mountains of the moon, such as was given by antiquity to mountains in the neighbourhood of which the Nile was supposed to rise".

James Grant and John Speke in 1862 sought the source of the White Nile in the Great Lakes region. Henry Morton Stanley finally found glacier-capped mountains possibly fitting Diogenes's description in 1889 (they had eluded European explorers for so long due to often being shrouded in mist). Today known as the Rwenzori Mountains, the peaks are the source of some of the Nile's waters, but only a small fraction, and Diogenes would have crossed the Victoria Nile to reach them.

Many modern scholars doubt that these were the Mountains of the Moon described by Diogenes, some holding that his reports were wholly fabricated. G. W. B. Huntingford suggested in 1940 that the Mountain of the Moon should be identified with Mount Kilimanjaro (despite Kilimanjaro being a solitary mountain rather than a mountain range and not feeding the Nile at all), and "was subsequently ridiculed in J. Oliver Thompson's History of Ancient Geography published in 1948". Huntingford later noted that he was not alone in this theory, citing Sir Harry Johnston in 1911 and Dr. Gervase Mathew later in 1963 having made the same identification. O. G. S. Crawford identified this range with the Mount Abuna Yosef area in the Amhara Region of Ethiopia.

== Cultural references ==
=== Literature ===
- In Miguel de Cervantes' 1604 novel Don Quijote de la Mancha, the title character likens the roaring sound of a local river to water that falls from the high Mountains of the Moon.
- Henry David Thoreau's 1849 book A Week on the Concord and Merrimack Rivers compares the Mountains of the Moon, the Rocky Mountains, and the Himalayas ("Himmaleh") as having "a kind of personal importance in the annals of the world".
- Edgar Allan Poe's 1849 poem "Eldorado" references the Mountains of the Moon.
- Vachel Lindsay's 1914 (published—written in 1912) poem "Congo" contains the lines "From the mouth of the Congo to the Mountains of the Moon".
- Adventure!, a 1931 travelogue by Carveth Wells, details a trip over the Scott Elliot Pass, noting the tropical glaciers and their "prehistoric vegetation", including lobelias 10 feet (3.0 m) tall, groundsel 30 feet (9.1 m) tall, and enormous patches of green or yellow mosses. In another chapter he tells the story of the great explorer Henry Morton Stanley and why his discovery of the Mountains of the Moon in 1889 was refuted for decades and caused them to be removed from maps for many years.
- A 1937 Bengali adventure novel by Bibhutibhushan Bandyopadhyay has the name of Chander Pahar, meaning the "mountains of the moon". The novel chronicles the adventures of an Indian boy in the forests of Africa.
- In a 1964 children's book by Willard Price called Elephant Adventure, the story takes place in the Mountains of the Moon, where the wildlife trees and other vegetation are supposed to be of sizes at least one third larger than in the rest of Africa. Price cites a March 1962 article in National Geographic Magazine as the basis for his premise.
- Mountains of the Moon is a song by Grateful Dead's Robert Hunter (lyrics) and Jerry Garcia (music). Its first release on record was on their album AOXOMOXOA, released in 1969 by the Warner Bros.-Seven Arts label.
- Expedition to the Mountains of the Moon is the third novel in the steampunk alternate history series "Burton & Swinburne" by Mark Hodder.
- Pygmy Kitabu by Jean-Pierre Hallet cites the Mountains of the Moon as the source of the White Nile (Random House 1973).
- According to J.K. Rowling and Pottermore, it is the location of Uagadou, the African School of Witchcraft and Wizardry.
- In The Quest by Wilbur A. Smith, Taita the Magus in his search for the source of the Nile travels to the Mountains of the Moon where the witch Eos has established her lair. While the book doesn't exactly allude that it's the source of the Nile, it purports that the mountains are key in formation of the Kitangule River which is a key tributary of the Nile.

=== Movies and television ===
- The 1965 film based on the H. Rider Haggard novel She is set in a lost Egyptian colony located in The Mountains of the Moon.
- The feature film Mountains of the Moon (1990) relates the story of Sir Richard Francis Burton and John Hanning Speke seeking the source of the Nile in the 1850s.
- The Mountains of the Moon were featured in the television documentary series Africa by David Attenborough on BBC 1, shown in January 2013.
- A film based on the novel Chander Pahar, directed by Kamaleshwar Mukherjee, was scheduled to begin shooting in February 2013. The film is produced by Shree Venkatesh Films and was shot on locations in Africa. The film was released on 20 December 2013.

== See also ==
- Mountains of the Moon (song)
- Mountains of Kong
