= Lion Adventure =

1967 novel by Willard Price

- First UK edition (publ. Jonathan Cape)
- Author: Willard Price
- Language: English
- Publication date: 1967

Lion Adventure is a 1967 children's novel by the Canadian-born American author Willard Price featuring his "Adventure" series characters, Hal and Roger Hunt. It depicts their attempts to capture a lion for a zoo, which is hampered by a dangerous man-eating lion who parallels the well-known Tsavo maneaters.

== Allies ==
- Warden Mark Crosby- A major character in the previous novel, Safari Adventure, Crosby is a warden of Tsavo National Park. Hal and Roger visit him to enquire about using his plane, the Stork, to watch for man-eaters, though he recommends and lends to them his hydrogen balloon, the Jules Verne.
- Tanga- The station master along the Tsavo railway. Hal initially suspects him of being against them, but Tanga had merely been passing on the orders of the cruel district officer, King Ku.
- The Safari Team - The Hunt safari team, including Joro, Mali, Toto and Zulu the alsatian, plays only a minor role in this story, as their assistance is staunchly denied by King Ku, the Tsavo District Officer. When Hal offers to build a school in the village of Gula so that Basa can teach, he instructs his safari team to help build it.

== Enemies ==
- King Ku- King Ku is the giant Tsavo District Officer. From the moment of the Hunts' arrival, Ku appears to want them dead, forbidding the aid of their safari team in the hope that a man-eater lion would kill them. It is Ku who cuts the trail line of their balloon prior to the huge storm, casting Hal and Roger dangerously adrift and almost resulting in their deaths. At the end of the novel, after the capture of Black Mane the man-eater lion, King Ku apologises, citing that his irrational hate of white people had been caused by the murders of his wife and children, for which he believed whites to be responsible. As King Ku eventually discovered, his family had actually been killed by a member of the black Mau Mau, after Ku had refused to take an oath to kill whites.
- Dugan- Dugan is a hunter who had previously been employed to kill man-eating lions. When he failed on numerous occasions, shooting innocent and harmless animals, he was fired, though he resents Hal and Roger for taking his job. Out of desire to discredit the boys and reclaim his job, he shoots an innocent lion and blames it on Hal and Roger. He also unties the flaps of their tent in the hope that a man-eater would enter and kill them. When Dugan accidentally shoots a valued cow of the Gula village, he tries to hide his mistake, but the villagers track him down and put him on the first train to Nairobi, threatening to kill him if he ever returns.
- Basa- A young man from the village of Gula, Basa's father was killed by Black Mane the man-eater lion. Because the lion had first attacked Hal and Roger and they had escaped, Basa blames the boys for his father's death, vowing revenge. Basa eventually attacks Hal with a knife, but he is overpowered. Hal uncovers the true reason for Basa's frustration - he wishes to build a school in his village, but cannot acquire the required funds. Hal generously offers to fund the school himself, and Basa is immediately overjoyed.

== Animals captured ==
Animals captured in Lion Adventure
Species	Name	Details
Lion cub	Flop	His mother was killed whilst attacking Hal, and Roger adopted him. He is very playful, though unaware of his own strength.
Male lion	Black Mane	Flop's father, and a man-eater, responsible for countless deaths. He was gently coaxed into a cage by Roger at the end of the novel and, distracted by the love for his cub, Black Mane was captured without incident. The two lions, accompanied by Roger's inspirational story, were sold to Bronx Zoo for $15,000.

== Notes ==
The hydrogen balloon, the Jules Verne, is named after the author Jules Verne, who wrote the novel Five Weeks in a Balloon, whose plot mirrors the adventures Hal and Roger have in their balloon.

== Reception ==
Kirkus Reviews reviewed it negatively, saying, "Gore plus stultifying stereotypes equals jungle rot (and unintentional camp)."
