= Kurbash =

Type of whip made from hippopotamus or rhinoceros hide

Kurbash, also known as Kourbash or Kurbaj (Arabic: كُرْبَاجْ, romanized: kurbāj, from Turkish: kırbaç, "a whip"), is a whip or strap about a yard (91 cm) in length, made of the hide of the hippopotamus or rhinoceros. It is an instrument of punishment and torture that was used in the Ottoman Empire, most especially in Egypt. It was a tool widely employed by officials for various purposes of the state, including the obtaining of confessions from criminals, the collection of taxes, and the enforcement upon the population of the form of servitude known as corvée labor.

== The Kurbash in Egypt ==
=== Use and purpose ===
In Egypt, the kurbash was already in use during the periods of Ottoman and Mamluk control. Its use did not diminish once these powers were removed, however, as their overthrow and the subsequent reign of Mehmet Ali (r. 1805–1848) was also characterized by widespread use of the whip. During his reign, Mehmet Ali bolstered his project of Egyptian reform with massive public works projects, largely realized through the use of corvée labor. Those enlisted in this corvée were peasants known as the fellahin, and were uprooted from their lands and forced to labor as a part of work gangs. In the interest of maintaining agricultural productivity and increasing state revenue, it was a common practice for foremen to enforce this type of labor by applying whip on the fellahin. The use of the kurbash upon the fellahin was also codified in the Qanun al-Filaha, a set of codes created in the 1830s that dealt with offenses that largely concerned peasants. Within its fifty-five articles dealing with offenses related to land cultivation, damages to public property, and offenses by public employees, twenty-six articles prescribe the use of the kurbash.

The kurbash was additionally applied on those who were not peasants or corvée laborers. Under Mehmet Ali's rule, procedure surrounding the military was largely built within the context of his larger schedule of reform for Egypt. As such, the military under Muhammad Ali sought to train and discipline its soldiers through the use of methods of internment, surveillance and corporal punishment. As such, the whip was largely employed against soldiers for the purpose of creating discipline within the military. In 1825, when leading an official French training mission in Egypt, General Pierre Boyer noted that soldiers who were insubordinate would face five hundred strokes of the kurbash, while those who attempted desertion would receive one thousand strokes. Other such accounts of the military at the time list the whip being applied for various discrepancies of soldiers, from losing water buckets to stealing apricots from a market. The use of the kurbash in this way was intended to not only discipline the soldier receiving the punishment, but also enforce obedience on the rest of the soldiers: whippings took place in front of the punished soldier's battalion so that his fellow soldiers were to watch.

=== Abolition ===
The abolition of the kurbash as a tool of statecraft and maintenance of order in Egypt was an effort by both British foreigners with influence in the state as well as native Egyptians, respectively. Early efforts to ban the whip came from the Egyptian government, as Khedive Isma'il (r. 1863–1879) and Prime Minister Mustafa Riyad Pasha (r. 1879–1881, 1888–1891, 1893–1894) both led unsuccessful efforts to suppress or ban the use of the kurbash and the similar practice of bastinado.

The British built off of these efforts by the Egyptians and approached the use of the kurbash from the lens of human rights violations. In the late 19th century, the British were in the midst of a reform project in Egypt characterized by humanitarian sentiment and a motivation to enforce stability in the state. The British government under Prime Minister William Gladstone sent its ambassador to the Ottoman Porte, Lord Frederick Dufferin, to Egypt in 1882. Upon arriving to Egypt, Dufferin was openly critical of the pervasive use of the kurbash, and worked towards abolishing its use as part of the greater schedule of reform along British lines. The following year, in 1883, the Egyptian minister of the interior Isma'il Aiyub issued a circulation forbidding the application of the kurbash after the death of a man by flogging provided a proximate cause for the illegality of the kurbash.

The application of the whip vanished most quickly in the realm of tax collection, a phenomenon credited by the British Consul-General in Egypt to the tax reform under Anglo-French dual control. The practice for the use of enforcing corvée labor later disappeared, as this form of labor was largely abolished by the British in 1892. Despite the lessening of the practice in these two arenas, there was no clear and effective blanket prohibition on the use of the kurbash. While the practice disappeared from some areas, it remained widespread in the realm of justice, even experienced a revival in the middle to late 1880s. One such explanation for this area of discrepancy in which there still maintained a strong use of the kurbash is that some reformists stood to benefit from its continued use: in order to keep crime rates low, some reformists ignored the use of the purportedly illegal whip. The kurbash would not be recognized as abolished until 1922, with the Unilateral Declaration of Egyptian Independence from Great Britain.

== In popular culture ==
In his 1899 book The River War, Winston Churchill draws upon the image of the kurbash as a symbol of oppression: "Ages of oppression and poverty rarely produce proud and warlike spirits. Patriotism does not grow under the 'Kourbash.'"

== See also ==
- Sjambok
- Egyptian Armed Forces
- Muhammad Ali of Egypt
- Military of the Ottoman Empire
- Fallah
- Mamluk Sultanate
- Egyptian Public Works
