= The Japanese Miracle and Peril =

1971 non-fiction book by Willard Price

The Japanese Miracle and Peril is a 1971 non-fiction book about Japan by Willard Price.

The book received a generally negative review from John Schreiner in the National Post. He described the scholarship and superficial and said it relied too heavily on secondary sources. It was more positively received by William J. Swank in the Jackson Citizen Patriot.
