= Gorilla Adventure =

1969 children's book by Willard Price

- First US edition cover
- Author: Willard Price
- Series: Adventure
- Publisher: John Day
- Publication date: February 1, 1969

Gorilla Adventure is a 1969 children's book by the Canadian-born American author Willard Price featuring his "Adventure" series characters, Hal and Roger Hunt. It depicts an expedition to capture a giant mountain gorilla for a circus.

The location was post-colonial Congo. As usual, the greatest danger posed to the brothers, and to the animals, came not from the wild beasts but in the form of humans. The two main primary antagonists were: one inept, boastful but cowardly Belgian (Andre Tieg) who passes himself off as a guide, and a poacher of gorillas, called Nero, whose primary method was to slaughter all adults and take the young gorillas.

In the midst of the dangers, Roger becomes temporarily blinded by a spitting cobra. One villager refers to a gorilla as a 'man who can't speak' in a reference to gorilla intelligence.

The safari team are complete in this adventure.

== Other persons ==
- A doctor in the field hospital performs surgery on Gog. Gog was shot by Tieg.
- Two diamond searchers. Gog holds Hal's hand, and eye-to-eye contact ensures that Gog knows the truth.

== Animals captured ==
Animals captured in Gorilla Adventure
Species	Name	Details
Male Gorilla	Gog	His family were slaughtered by Nero and he assumed the safari team to be the killers.
Two baby gorillas	Bubu & Nuru	Their entire band were killed by Nero and his gang.
Female Gorilla	Lady Luck	She is easily captured by Roger because she is distracted by wrestling with the white python.
Python	Snow White	Although this python is white in colour she is not an albino, as evidenced by her blue eyes.
Black Panther		Gog trapped Hal in an elephant pit and threw the panther into it. Hal captured the panther empty-handed, though he received serious injuries.
Road Runner		
Chimpanzee	The Good Samaritan	This chimpanzee gained his nickname by helping a colobus in the midst of volcano eruption.
Boomslang		Particularly notable for possessing two heads.
Cobra		
Mamba		
Elephant Shrew		
Bush Baby		
Colobus	The Little Bishop	
