= Volcano Adventure =

- First UK edition (publ. Jonathan Cape)
- Author: Willard Price
- Language: English
- Publication date: 1956

Volcano Adventure is a 1956 children's book by the Canadian-born American author Willard Price featuring his "Adventure" series characters, Hal and Roger Hunt. It depicts a journey to several of the world's most dangerous volcanoes. The story involves the brothers meeting a volcanologist and deals with volcanology, perhaps one of the more scientific of Price's novels.

== Legacy ==
In 2013, British adventurer Bear Grylls listed Volcano Adventure as one of his favourite adventure stories. He wrote: "Hal and Roger Hunt have a fantastic never-say-die attitude, and show great problem-solving skills as they save the lives of people from deadly volcanic disasters. It's very well researched too, and most of the events are based upon real-life volcanic disasters."
