= African Adventure =

1963 children's book by Willard Price

- First US edition
- Author: Willard Price
- Illustrator: Pat Marriott
- Language: English
- Genre: Adventure comic
- Publisher: John Day (US); Jonathan Cape (UK)
- Publication place: United States
- English publication date: 1963
- Pages: 189 pp
- ISBN: 0-340-14904-3
- OCLC: 16203319

African Adventure is a 1963 children's book by the Canadian-American author Willard Price featuring his "Adventure" series characters, Hal and Roger Hunt.

On Safari in Uganda, Hal and Roger manage to capture a varied collection of African animals including a pigeon, hyena, cape buffalo, and leopard. But their efforts are threatened by the antics of fraudulent White Hunter "Colonel" Benjamin Bigg, and by a member of the Leopard Society who is out to kill them.

== Legacy ==
Richard Phillips cites African Adventure as an example of western authors acknowledging decolonisation, albeit through a traditionally colonial lens. "Though Price acknowledges African anti-colonial resistance," Phillips writes, "he collapses it back into a form of primitivism and savagery." In 2015, Tim Dee, writing for The Guardian, included African Adventure on his list of the "10 best nature books."
