= Cannibal Adventure =

1972 children's novel by Willard Price

- First UK edition (publ. Jonathan Cape)
- Author: Willard Price
- Publisher: Jonathan Cape
- Publication date: January 1, 1973
- ISBN: 978-0-381-99640-6

Cannibal Adventure is a 1972 children's novel by Willard Price featuring his "Adventure" series characters, Hal and Roger Hunt. It depicts an expedition to New Guinea in search of some exotic creatures as Komodo dragons, bandicoots and dinosaur lizards.

== Plot ==
Hal and Roger sail for New Guinea, an island still inhabited by headhunters and cannibals, where many dangers await them. However, they soon realize that the cannibals are not their biggest threat when they discover an old enemy that has escaped from jail and is bent on revenge.

== Legacy ==
English author Anthony McGowan, who revived the Adventure series in 2012, has cited Cannibal Adventure as "a particular favourite" of the original books. He writes that "although there is a certain amount of racial stereotyping," Price "actually treats the indigenous Papuans with great respect." In 2014, Express included Cannibal Adventure in its list of "100 books every child should read."
