= Adventure series (Willard Price) =

American children's book series

The Adventure series is a collection of children's adventure novels by Willard Price. The original series, comprising 14 novels, was published between 1949 and 1980, and chronicles the adventures of teenagers Hal and Roger Hunt as they travel the world collecting exotic and dangerous animals. Beginning in 2012, Anthony McGowan published four more novels in the series, which featured Hal and Roger's children.

== Writing ==
Shortly before his death, in 1983, Price wrote that:

My aim in writing the Adventure series for young people was to lead them to read by making reading exciting and full of adventure. At the same time I want to inspire an interest in wild animals and their behavior. Judging from the letters I have received from boys and girls around the world, I believe I have helped open to them the worlds of books and natural history.

== Characters ==
=== Protagonists ===
Hal and Roger Hunt are the sons of animal collector John Hunt; they have taken a year off school to help capture animals for their father's collection on Long Island, New York, after which the captive specimens are sold to zoos, circuses and safari parks. In Amazon Adventure, the boys' literary debut, Hal is 18 years old and Roger is 13 years old.

Hal is tall, handsome, and muscular, possessing an unusual knowledge of history. Roger is a practical joker, often mischievous, but also resourceful.

=== Supporting characters ===
Hal and Roger are aided by many characters in their adventures, some of whom reappear in subsequent books. Their father John Hunt personally leads the expeditions in Amazon Adventure and African Adventure. In the South Seas the brothers are accompanied by the World War II veteran skipper Captain Ike and his trusted crewman Omo. The African safari team comprising Joro the tracker, Toto the gun bearer, Mali, and Zulu the German Shepherd dog had the most frequent appearances. As a former member of the cannibalistic Leopard Society, Joro is the only reformed antagonist who appears in more than one book.

Title	Year	Characters
Amazon Adventure	1949	John Hunt and Native American guide Napo
South Sea Adventure	1952	Captain Ike of the schooner Lively Lady and his Pacific Islander first mate Omo.
Underwater Adventure	1954	Captain Ike and Omo
Volcano Adventure	1956	Volcanologist Doctor Dan Adams
Whale Adventure	1960	Hal's friend Scott, a marine biologist
African Adventure	1963	Toto, Mali and Zulu the Alsatian dog
Elephant Adventure	1964	Tutsi chief Mumbo, his son Bo, Pygmy chief Abu, and African elephant calf Big Boy
Safari Adventure	1966	Warden Mark Crosby and Chee the Cheetah
Lion Adventure	1967	Joro, Toto, Mali and Zulu
Gorilla Adventure	1969	Sam the chimpanzee, Lady Luck the mountain gorilla, and Dr. Burton, the doctor who treats Gog's bullet wound
Diving Adventure	1970	Inhabitants of Undersea City
Cannibal Adventure	1972	Papua New Guinea villagers and their chief
Tiger Adventure	1979	Headman of a Himalayan village who tasks the Hunts with capturing a Man-eating leopard.
Arctic Adventure	1980	Nanook the polar bear, and Olrick and Aram, two Inuit

=== Villains ===
Each novel in the Adventure series is notable for its memorable selection of loathsome villains and enemies. Some of these, through their interactions with Hal and Roger, are led to redeem their past misdeeds, while others simply suffer the consequences of their actions. Only one character, the cunning "Reverend" Merlin Kaggs, appears as a villain in more than one book.

Title	Year	Characters
Amazon Adventure	1949	Shark Sands and his henchmen Croc and Banco
South Sea Adventure	1952	Merlin Kaggs and Crab
Underwater Adventure	1954	Skink
Volcano Adventure	1956	
Whale Adventure	1960	Captain Grindle
African Adventure	1963	Joro and Colonel Bigg
Elephant Adventure	1964	Arab slavers led by the Thunder Man
Safari Adventure	1966	Judge Singh alias Blackbeard
Lion Adventure	1967	Black Mane, King Ku, Dugan and Basa
Gorilla Adventure	1969	Gog, Andre Tieg and Nero
Diving Adventure	1970	Merlin Kaggs
Cannibal Adventure	1972	Merlin Kaggs and Witch doctor
Tiger Adventure	1979	Vic Stone
Arctic Adventure	1980	Zeb

== Revival ==
In October 2006, the Price family of Holden, Massachusetts entered into an agreement to sell the copyrights and related legal rights for the fourteen Adventure series titles, plus the right to use Price's name, to London-based literary brand owner and investor Fleming Literary Management for an undisclosed six-figure sum.

In July 2011, it was announced that British author Anthony McGowan had been contracted by Puffin Books to write four new books based on Willard Price's classic wildlife adventures series. The first, Leopard Adventure, will see Hal's son Frazer and Roger's daughter Amazon meet for the first time, before sending them off on an adventure to save the rare Amur leopard. Brothers Hal and Roger, who enjoyed a close relationship as teenagers, have fallen out in the new books.

"Hal Hunt has set up this organisation which goes around the world saving species and his son Fraser works with him on that. He's fallen out with Roger who's a freelance conservationist – there's some sibling rivalry there. Hal's slightly hand in hand with big business, he's slightly compromised, and Roger's more of a free spirit," said McGowan, a fan of the Price novels as a child. "Roger and his wife have disappeared and because Amazon's parents have gone missing, Fraser comes to meet her."

== Retrospective reviews ==
David Barnett, writing for The Guardian in 2010, praised the book series, writing that "Price not only knew all the right buttons to press to excite a young reader – exotic locations, nasty villains, wild animals and lashings of peril – but also managed to weave into his adventures a strong yet subtle conservation message."

Novelists David Mitchell and Mark Gatiss have cited the Adventure series as among their favourite childhood books. Anthony Horowitz discovered the Adventure series at age 11, and has cited the series as an influence on his own writing. "If you read Willard Price," said Horowitz, "you'll find the chemical formula for an Alex Rider book: page-turning, lots of action, lots of activity, good strong characters."

== Analysis ==
According to Richard Phillips, who studied the politics of the series, Willard Price acknowledges decolonisation in his writing, but does so through a "conventionally colonial lens":

Price acknowledges decolonization but reproduces colonialist tropes in his portrayal of Africa. His adventure stories illustrate the sort of geographical literature that critics sought to change, initially to catch up with the facts and values of decolonization, ultimately to contribute to the critical transformation of those facts and values.

== Books ==
=== Willard Price ===
Title	Year	Summary
Amazon Adventure	1949	Hal and Roger travel to the Amazon rainforest, where they embark on an expedition into the uncharted territory of the Pastaza River.
South Sea Adventure	1952	Hal and Roger become stranded on an island in the South Seas, in the manner of Robinson Crusoe.
Underwater Adventure	1954	Hal and Roger join the Oceanographic Institute as part of an underwater operation in the South Seas.
Volcano Adventure	1956	Hal and Roger join forces with volcanologist Dr. Dan Adams to study volcanoes in the Pacific.
Whale Adventure	1960	Hal and Roger join the crew of a whaling ship, working under the nefarious Captain Grindle.
African Adventure	1963	Hal and Roger Hunt search for a man-eating leopard, but fall afoul of a sinister organisation known as the Leopard Society.
Elephant Adventure	1964	Hal and Roger attempt to track down a rare white elephant in Africa's Mountains of the Moon.
Safari Adventure	1966	Hal and Roger join warden Mark Crosby in Tsavo National Park, where wildlife poaching is a major problem.
Lion Adventure	1967	Hal and Roger must help save the people of Mtito Andei from a man-eating lion.
Gorilla Adventure	1969	Hal and Roger search for mountain gorillas deep in the Congo jungle.
Diving Adventure	1970	Hal and Roger embark on a specimen-collecting trip to Undersea City.
Cannibal Adventure	1972	Hal and Roger travel to New Guinea, where they make contact with a cannibalistic tribe.
Tiger Adventure	1979	Hal and Roger are in India, where they search for a rare white tiger, high in the Himalayas.
Arctic Adventure	1980	Hal and Roger Hunt go to Greenland to capture wild animals and send them to their father's animal farm on Long Island. With the help of Nanook, a huge polar bear, and Olrick, a Greenlandic Inuit, they capture many animals. However, all is not well. They meet an American rogue called Zeb who is determined to kill the two teenagers.

=== Anthony McGowan ===
Title	Year	Summary
Leopard Adventure	2012	Amazon Hunt (age 12, daughter of Roger) and her cousin Frazer (age 13, son of Hal) must brave the Russian wilderness to save the Amur leopard.
Bear Adventure	2013	Amazon's parents have been lost in a plane crash, and her only hope is that they are wandering the wild forests of Canada.
Shark Adventure	2013	On a remote Polynesian island, Amazon and Frazer Hunt are saving rare leatherback turtles.
Python Adventure	2014	Amazon's parents have been kidnapped, and their trail leads to Mumbai, India.
