= Summer Colors =

Single by Wayne Newton

from the album Somewhere My Love
- A-side: "Dream Street Rose"
- Released: July 1967
- Genre: Pop
- Label: Capitol Records 5954
- Songwriter(s): Joseph Meyer, Curtis Mann

Wayne Newton singles chronology
"If I Only Had a Song to Sing" (1967)	"Summer Colors" (1967)	"Love of the Common People" (1967)

"Summer Colors" is a song written by Joseph Meyer and Curtis Mann and performed by Wayne Newton. It reached #20 on the U.S. adult contemporary chart in 1967. It was featured on his 1968 album, Somewhere My Love.

The song was arranged by Jimmie Haskell.
