= Weeping =

Weeping may refer to:

- The human act of crying (also see wailing (disambiguation))
- The seeping of an open or healing wound, either of serum or pus, sometimes accompanied by a strong smell
- A growth form in plants with pendulous, draping branches, most often associated with weeping willow trees
- "Weeping" (song), an anti-apartheid protest song
