= Mary Makhatho =

South African actress (1965–2017)

- Born: 10 August 1965; Soshanguve, South Africa
- Died: 7 August 2017 (aged 51); Pretoria, South Africa
- Occupation: Actress
- Years active: 1998–2017

Mary Makhatho (10 August 1965 – 7 August 2017) was a South African actress. She was best known for her television roles in Yizo Yizo, Gaz'lam, Generations and Ga Re Dumele.

== Personal life ==
Makhatho was born on 10 August 1965 in Soshanguve, South Africa.

On 6 July 2017, she was severely injured after a fall. She hit the head during the fall and was in a coma. Then she was rushed to a Johannesburg hospital. Four days later, she was transferred to a Pretoria hospital and placed in high care on 10 July. However, she died on 7 August 2017 at the age of 51 without regained consciousness. She was buried at Block VV Cemetery in Soshanguve on 14 August 2017.

== Career ==
In 1998, she appeared in the SABC2 drama series Kelebone. In 2000, she joined with SABC1 children's serial Soul Buddyz, where she played the role "Beauty". In 2002, she appeared in two serials: Yizo Yizo and Gaz'lam with minor roles. From 2002 until 2009, she portrayed the character of Ma Dimpho on the hit children’s programme Takalani Sesame (the South African version of Sesame Street). She was the second actress to portray the role, taking over from Motshabi Tyelele (who performed the character in Takalani Sesame’s first season, which lasted from 2000 until 2001). Then she appeared in some episodes as "Puleng" of the SABC1 soap opera Generations. In 2006, she acted in the Canadian CBC serial Jozi-H with the role "Dumisani's First Wife". In 2008, she joined with e.tv soap opera Rhythm City for the role "Connie". After few years, she retired from the show, but rejoined with the show in 2014.

In 2010, she appeared in the e.tv drama serial eKasi: Our Stories with the role of "Nelly". In the same year, she joined with the SABC2 sitcom Ga Re Dumele where she played the role of "Esther Mamoruti Tlhong". The show became very popular where she continued to play the role for five seasons until 2016. In 2015, she joined with the SABC2 drama serial Mamello to play the role "Mosumbuka". In 2015, she acted in the Hollywood blockbuster feature film Duma directed by Carroll Ballard. In the film, she played the critics acclaimed role of "Thandi".

== Filmography ==
Year	Film	Role	Genre	Ref.
2000	Soul Buddyz	Beauty	TV series	
2002-2009	Takalani Sesame	Ma Dimpho	TV series	
2002	Yizo Yizo	Councillor	TV series	
2002	Gaz'lam	Portia's Doctor	TV series	
	Generations	Puleng	TV series	
2005	Duma	Thadi	Film	
2006	Jozi-H	Dumisani's First Wife	TV series	
2008	Rhythm City	Connie	TV series	
2010	eKasi: Our Stories	Nelly	TV series	
2010	Ga Re Dumele	Esther Mamoruti Tlhong	TV series	
2010	Intersexions	Thami's Mother	TV series	
2013	Geraamtes in die Kas	Gladys Rhamaphosa	TV series	
2013	Mzansi Love	Sister Maria	TV series	
2013	Remix	Aunt Jabu	TV series	
2015	Mamello	Miss Masombuka	TV series	
2016	Greed & Desire	Refiloe Makgetla	TV series	
2016	90 Plein Street	Ausi Polina	TV series	
2016	Doubt	Tumi	TV series	
