= Joseph Meyer (songwriter) =

- Born: March 12, 1894; Modesto, California, U.S.
- Died: June 22, 1987 (aged 93) New York City, U.S.
- Occupation: Songwriter

Joseph Meyer (March 12, 1894 – June 22, 1987) was an American songwriter, who wrote some of the most notable songs of the first half of the twentieth century. Many of his songs were originally written for Broadway musicals.

== Early life and career ==
Joseph Meyer was born in Modesto, California. He studied violin in Paris for a year in 1907–1908. He graduated from Lowell High School in San Francisco, where he later played his violin in a café.

Meyer was in the military during World War I and, upon discharge, worked in a mercantile business in the United States. He began songwriting in 1921, when he stopped working in the mercantile business and moved to New York City.

== Later life and career ==
Meyer collaborated with many famous songwriters of the day including Buddy DeSylva, Al Lewis and Al Sherman. Three of his most famous songs were the 1922 hit, "California, Here I Come", "My Honey's Lovin' Arms" (1922) and "If You Knew Susie" (1925), a song he co-wrote with Buddy DeSylva. Meyer songs have been featured in over 120 motion picture soundtracks.

He wrote the melody to "A Cup of Coffee, a Sandwich, and You", lyrics by Al Dubin and Billy Rose, often used in Warner Brothers' cartoons during scenes of hunger, cooking and eating.

Wayne Newton recorded his song "Summer Colors" in 1967, when it reached number 20 on the U.S. adult contemporary chart.

Meyer died in New York in June 1987, at the age of 93, following a long illness.

== Broadway musicals ==
- Battling Buttler (1923)
- Big Boy (1925)
- Gay Paree (1925)
- Charlot Revue (1925)
- Sweetheart Time (1926)
- Just Fancy (1927)
- Here's Howe (1928)
- Lady Fingers (1929)
- Jonica (1930)
- Luana (1930)
- Sweet and Low (1930)
- Shoot the Works (1931)
- Ziegfeld Follies of 1934 (1934)
- New Faces of 1936 (1936)
- Shuffle Along (1952, revival)
- Perfectly Frank (1980)
- Five Guys Named Moe (1993)
