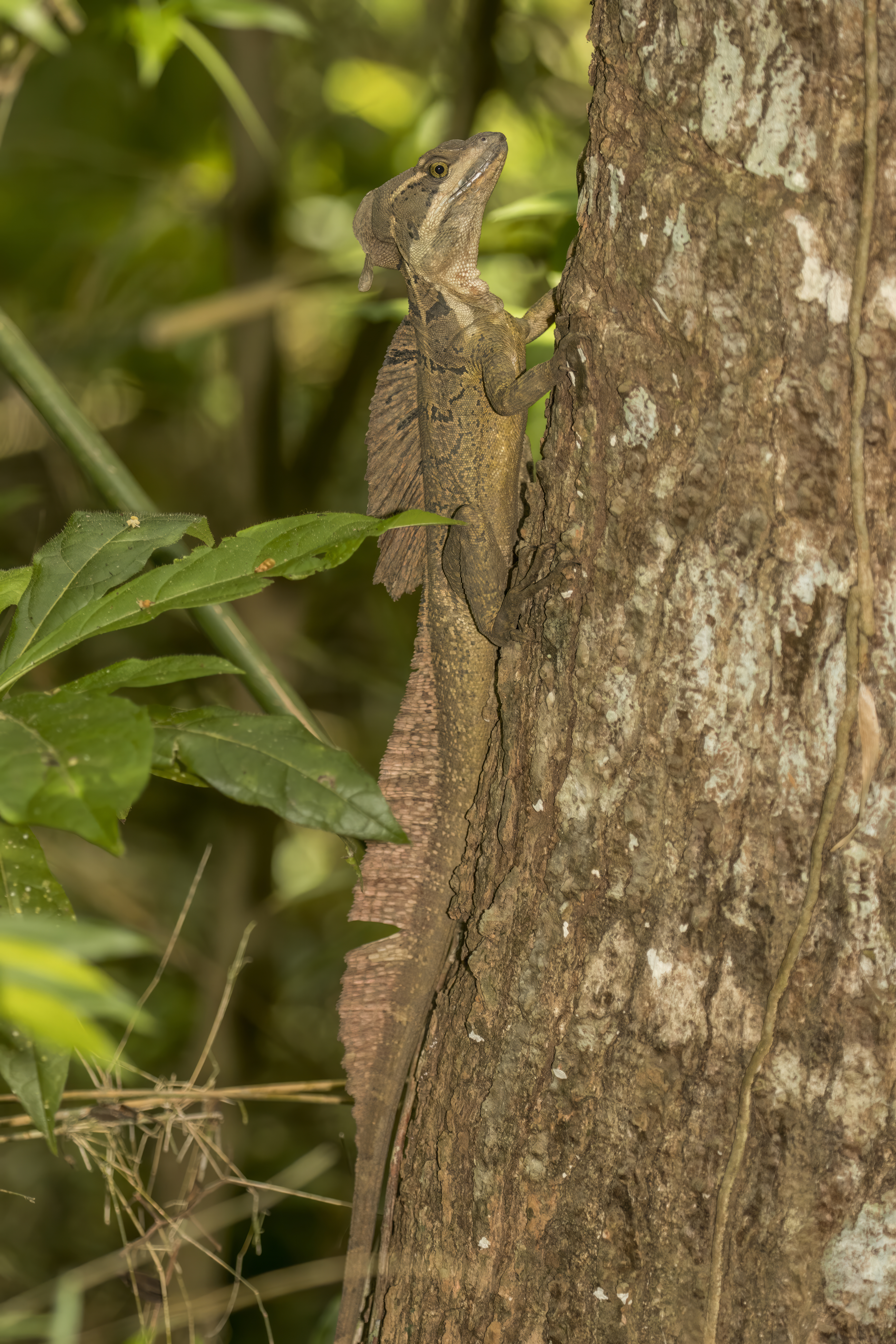
- Male
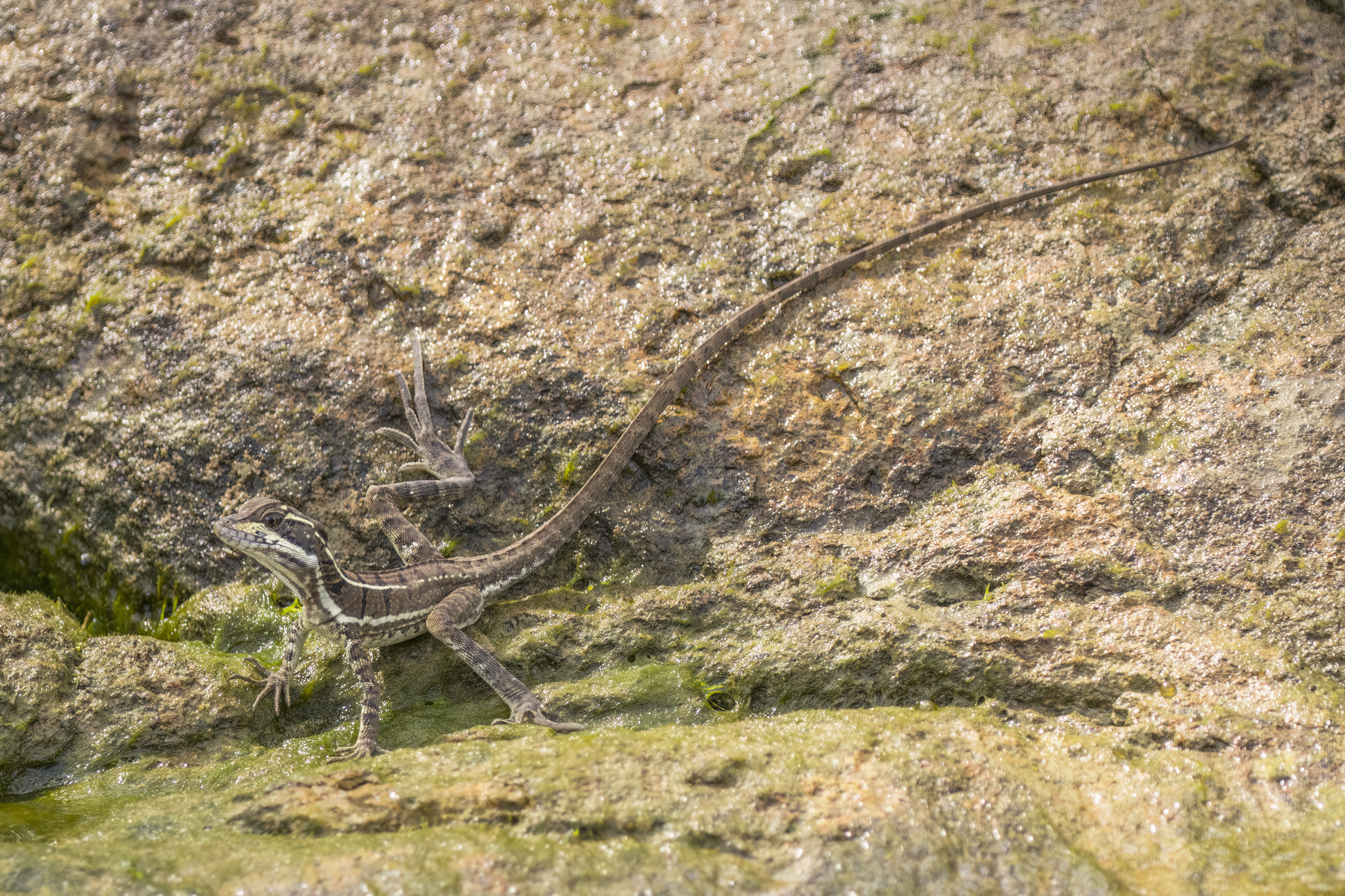
- Female both in Panama

Conservation status
- Least Concern (IUCN 3.1)

Scientific classification
- Kingdom: Animalia
- Phylum: Chordata
- Class: Reptilia
- Order: Squamata
- Suborder: Iguania
- Family: Corytophanidae
- Genus: Basiliscus
- Species: B. basiliscus

Binomial name
- Basiliscus basiliscus (Linnæus, 1758)

Synonyms
- Lacerta basiliscus Linnæus, 1758; Basiliscus americanus Laurenti, 1768; Basiliscus basiliscus Wagler, 1830; Basiliscus americanus Boulenger, 1885; Basiliscus basiliscus Lang, 1989

= Common basilisk =

Species of lizard

The common basilisk (Basiliscus basiliscus) is a species of lizard in the family Corytophanidae. The species is endemic to Central America and South America, where it is found near rivers and streams in rainforests. It is also known as the Jesus Christ lizard, Jesus lizard, South American Jesus lizard, or lagarto de Jesus Cristo for its ability to run on the surface of water.

== Description ==
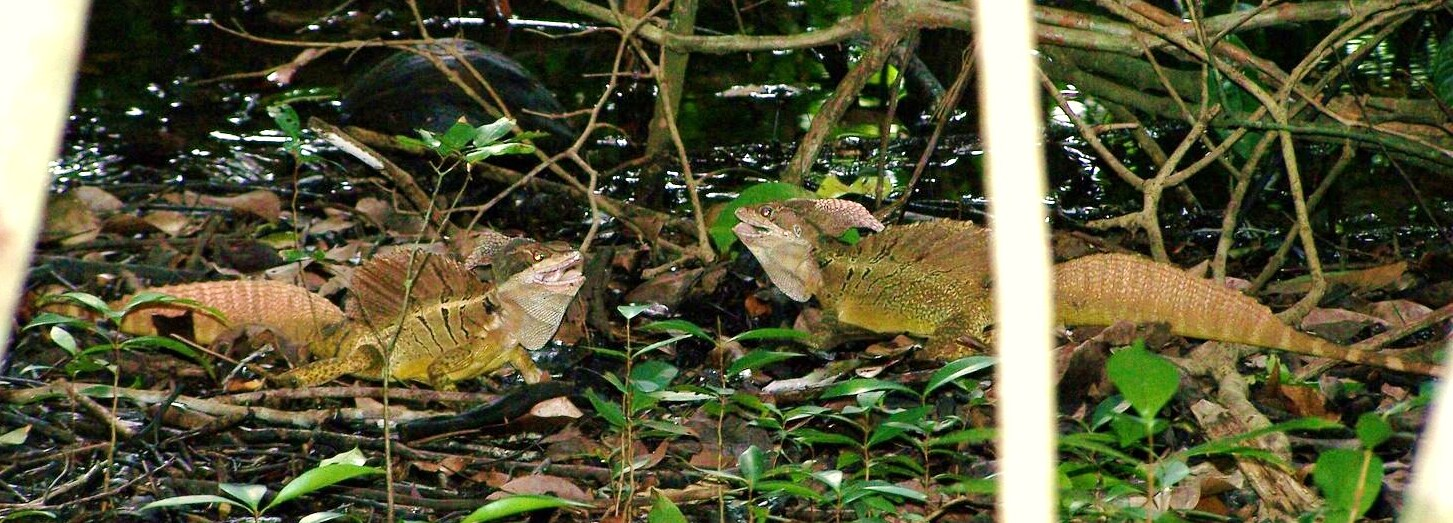
Males fighting, Costa Rica

The common basilisk can be distinguished from similar species within its range by its large size and the high fin-like crest along its back. Most common basilisks are brown and cream in color. Males also have high crests on the head and tail. Both genders are brown to olive, and have a white, cream, or yellow stripe on the upper lip and a second stripe along either side of the body; these stripes have higher contrast in juveniles and fade as the lizards age.

Hatchlings weigh a mere 2 grams (0.071 oz) and are 38 to 43 mm (1.5 to 1.7 in) long. Adults can grow to a total length (including tail) of 76 cm (2.5 feet). Females are generally 135 to 194 g (4.8 to 6.8 oz), and weigh half as much as males. The tail comprises 70 to 75% of the total length: for example, a 70-cm-long (27.5-inch-long) common basilisk would have a 50-cm-long (19.5-inch-long) tail. The common basilisk has a large mouth with saw-like teeth on the inner sides of the jaw. While the common basilisk is most known for its ability to run on water, it is also an excellent climber and swimmer, and has been known to stay underwater for up to half an hour. The average lifespan is seven years in captivity; in the wild, it tends to be less because of predators.

When startled, the common basilisk escapes by speeding to the nearest edge of water—and continues sprinting. The lizard runs on only its hind legs in an upright position, holding its forelegs to its sides. The common basilisk is adroit on water because its feet are large and equipped with flaps of skin along the toes that allow it to catch on tiny air bubbles. When moving quickly, the lizard can cross a surface of water before sinking. On water, it runs at an average speed of 24.1 km/h (15 mph), which is just a little slower than its speed on land. Younger basilisks can run 10 to 20 m (33 to 66 ft) on water, while adults cross only a few meters before sinking. Adults do not move slowly, but they weigh more and cannot sprint for as long a time. Once a basilisk submerges, it continues swimming until it is sufficiently far from its pursuer — if the predator has followed past the bank. Although the common basilisk stays close to water to escape terrestrial predators, it swims only when necessary because some other aquatic animals would eat it given the chance.

== Geographic range and habitat ==
The common basilisk is found in tropical rainforests throughout Central America and in northwestern South America, usually living in low elevations, from sea level to 600 m (2,000 ft). In Costa Rica, this basilisk can be found as high as 1,200 m (3,900 ft) in some places. The species ranges from southwestern Nicaragua to northwestern Colombia on the Pacific side, and from central Panama to northwestern Venezuela on the Atlantic side. In Costa Rica, it is mostly found on the Pacific side of the country. The equivalent species on the Atlantic side is the green basilisk (Basiliscus plumifrons), which occupies similar habitats and has similar biology.

== Diet ==
B. basiliscus is an omnivore; its diet consists of insects, for example, beetles or dragonflies; flowers, and small vertebrates such as snakes, birds, eggs, and fish.

== Predators ==
The common basilisk has numerous natural predators; large reptiles, birds, and some mammals. To avoid predators, it can conceal itself under leaves on the forest floor and can remain motionless for a long time. When the common basilisk must flee, though, its skill of running on water can help it avoid many predators, and when the common basilisk can no longer run on the water, it will use its strong swimming capabilities to continue underwater.

== Reproduction ==
Females of B. basiliscus lay three to four clutches of 10–20 eggs a year. Eggs hatch after about three months and the young weigh about two grams and are up to three inches long. Their outstanding camouflage allows them to remain undetected when they remain still.

== Walking on water ==
Running on water

The common basilisk, along with the other members of its genus, take the nickname the "Jesus Christ lizard" or "Jesus lizard" because when fleeing from predators, they gather sufficient momentum to run across the water for a brief distance while holding most of their body out of the water (similar to the biblical story of Jesus walking on water). Basilisks have large hind feet with scaly fringes on the sides of the third, fourth, and fifth toes. These are compressed against the toes when this lizard walks on land, but if it senses danger, it can jump into the water, opening up these fringes against the water's surface. This increases the surface area of the foot, thus allowing it to run on the water for short distances. Each step on the water is made up of three parts. First is the slap, the downward movement of the foot that pushes water out and away from the leg. This also created pockets of air around the foot. Next is the stroke, the backwards movement of the foot, which propels it forward. Next is the recovery, when the foot comes up and out of the water and prepares to do the slap again. Smaller basilisks can run about 10–20 m (33–66 ft) without sinking. Juveniles can usually run further than older basilisks, while holding more of their body above the water.

== Taxonomy and etymology ==
The common basilisk is named for the creature of Greek mythology made up of parts of a rooster, snake, and lion which could turn a man to stone by its gaze: the basilisk. Its generic, specific, and common names all derive from the Greek basilískos (βασιλίσκος), meaning 'little king'. The specific epithet was given in Carl Linnæus' 10th edition of Systema Naturæ.
