= How It Was with Dooms =

- Author: Carol Cawthra Hopcraft; Xan Hopcraft
- Language: English
- Genre: Children's novel
- Publisher: Margaret K. McElderry
- Publication date: 1997
- Publication place: United States
- Media type: Print (hardcover)
- Pages: 64 (first edition)
- ISBN: 0-689-81091-1
- OCLC: 34190718
- Dewey Decimal: 599.74/428
- LC Class: QL737.C23 H655 1997

How It Was with Dooms is a children's book dictated to Carol Cawthra Hopcraft by her young son Xan Hopcraft. It tells the true story of the young boy's friendship with an orphaned cheetah on the family's game ranch in Kenya. Carol Hopcraft, a wildlife photographer, provided photographs for the book, while her son provided illustrations. It was published in 1997 by Margaret K. McElderry, a division of Simon & Schuster. (64 pages, ISBN 0-689-81091-1) The book was loosely adapted into a film in 2005, under the title Duma.
