= A Cup of Coffee, a Sandwich and You =

1925 song composed by Joseph Meyer

- Sheet music, 1925

Song
- Published: 1925
- Composer(s): Joseph Meyer
- Lyricist(s): Al Dubin, Billy Rose

"A Cup of Coffee, a Sandwich and You" is a 1925 song written by Joseph Meyer, with lyrics by Al Dubin and Billy Rose. The title was inspired by the famous line "A Jug of Wine, a Loaf of Bread--and Thou" from the Rubaiyat of Omar Khayyam.

The song first gained popularity after it was performed (and recorded) by Gertrude Lawrence and Jack Buchanan in André Charlot's show Charlot's Revue when it came to New York in 1926. The song was Dubin's first significant success and was credited with bringing Lawrence and Buchanan popularity in the United States.

The song was licensed for use as a recurring motif in the Preston Sturges film Christmas in July (1940). It also appeared in the Jeanne Crain film Margie (1946). Carl Stalling would frequently use this song as backing music in Warner Bros. cartoons during scenes depicting hunger, cooking, or eating. Witch Hazel sings her own version of the tune, with altered lyrics, in Broom-Stick Bunny. The song was also recorded by Roger Wolfe Kahn and His Orchestra on Victor Records.
