= South Sea Adventure =

1952 children's book by Willard Price

- First US edition cover
- Author: Willard Price
- Language: English
- Series: Willard Price's Adventure series
- Genre: Young adult Adventure novel
- Publisher: John Day (US)
- Publication date: 1952
- Preceded by: Amazon Adventure
- Followed by: Underwater Adventure

South Sea Adventure is a 1952 children's book by the Canadian-born American author Willard Price featuring his "Adventure" series characters, Hal and Roger Hunt. The novel depicts an expedition to the South Pacific to capture animals for a zoo, and introduces the recurring villain Merlin Kaggs.

== Plot ==
Much of South Sea Adventure involves the Hunt brothers becoming stranded on an island in the manner of Robinson Crusoe. However, Hal and Roger's island is a pitiless environment scarce in such necessities as fresh water and adequate food. The brothers use their knowledge of science and zoology to survive.

== Allies ==
- Captain Ike- An old WW2 captain currently in command of the ship Lively Lady. His wife often accompanies him on his voyages but was told to remain behind on this trip due to the danger involved. While crusty and suspicious at first, he gradually develops a friendship with Hal and Roger.
- Omo- Captain Ike's first mate. He became a blood brother of Hal after his life was saved by the boy. He later took a bullet for him when trapped on the desert island.

== Enemies ==
- "Merlin Kaggs"- A shadowy, unseen character for most of the book although his presence is felt throughout. When he does make his appearance he removes his failed henchman, Crab, from the picture and tries to convince the boys that he is a Christian minister. The ploy worked to begin with, although Hal becomes suspicious towards the end. When they reach the island he tries to steal its pearl beds but is driven away by the boys and eventually goes mad after drinking sea water out of desperation.
- Crab- A spy placed aboard the ship by Merlin Kaggs. Lazy and shiftless, he ultimately fails to acquire the location of the boys' secret pearl island and is abandoned and framed by Kaggs as a result. Hal eventually bails him out of prison and he promptly joins the crew on a tanker and leaves without even a word of thanks.

== Legacy ==
In 2015, South Sea Adventure was named among the "100 best children's books of all time" by The Telegraph.
