= Wailing woman =

Musical motif and solo vocal effect

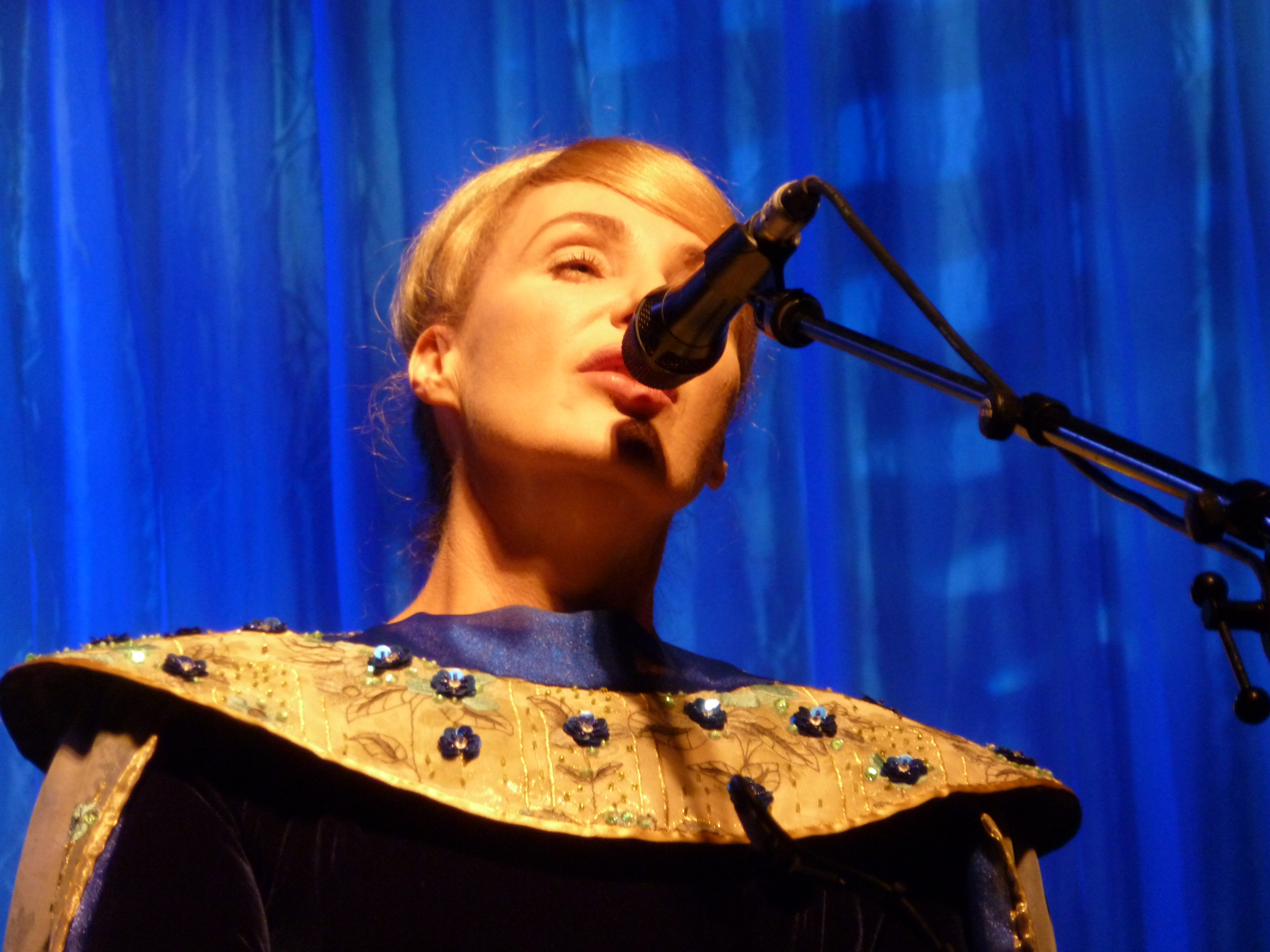
Lisa Gerrard's wailing solo vocal effect in Gladiator (2000) inspired film composers to implement the technique in post-Gladiator Hollywood.

The wailing woman is a musical motif and solo vocal effect that features "an exotic-sounding, ululating female singer" traditionally heard in the soundtracks of epic films and historical dramas. Generally composed in half-steps and featuring heavy vibrato, the "ethnic sounding" wailing woman technique is a "melodious lament" with unintelligible words and an "ethnic" vocal timbre, usually set in the natural minor, harmonic and/or melodic minor scale.

The mournful wail, typically sung in alto, may often deal with a tragic subject matter or a foreign locale, where it heightens the emotional moments in the scenes while expressing a dramatic mood. It has since been used in scores of film genres outside of drama, and as well as in television shows and video games. Other nicknames for this musical technique include, wailing female or moaning woman.

== Usage ==
=== Film ===
Although the vocal scoring approach was made popular by Gladiator (2000), composed by Hans Zimmer, it was not the first film to apply the motif; films released earlier such as, Patriot Games (1992), The Peacemaker (1997), The Prince of Egypt (1998), Stigmata (1999), 8mm (1999), and The Insider (1999) have utilized this style as well. Much earlier, Moses the Lawgiver (1974), The Last Temptation of Christ (1988) and 1492: Conquest of Paradise (1992) have also featured ethnic wailing vocals, though the latter two films feature a wailing, solo male vocalist rather.

Wailing woman example. "Hector's Death" from Troy (2004). Composed by James Horner with vocals of Tanja Tzarovska.

The motif was notably used throughout the 2000s and was heard in movies such as, Mission: Impossible 2 (2000), Black Hawk Down (2001), The Scorpion King (2002), The Four Feathers (2002), The Gospel of John (2003), Tears of the Sun (2003), Troy (2004), The Passion of the Christ (2004), Duma (2005), Munich (2005), The Kite Runner (2007), Elizabeth: The Golden Age (2007) and The Stoning of Soraya M. (2008).

In fantasy and science fiction, a mournful or melismatic female soloist has been applied in The Lord of the Rings film trilogy (2001–03), The Hulk (2003), The Day After Tomorrow (2004), Star Wars: Episode III – Revenge of the Sith (2005), King Kong (2005), 300 (2006), Transformers: Revenge of the Fallen (2009), Avatar (2009), Harry Potter and the Deathly Hallows Part 2 (2011), The Amazing Spider-Man (2012), Man of Steel (2013), Thor: The Dark World (2013), Gravity (2013) and Dune (2021).

After the wailing/moaning female became a cliched musical trope, the effect became parodied most notably in comedy films like Team America: World Police (2004) and Tropic Thunder (2008). Despite this, the vocal effect has continued to be used in 2010s epic films, such as in Son of God (2014), Exodus: Gods and Kings (2014) and 300: Rise of an Empire (2014), which feature male and female wailing.

=== Television and documentary ===
After Gladiator, television composers were inspired to use the vocal effect for shows like Rome (2005-2007), a series which periodically used the mourning woman vocal effect throughout. Spartacus (2010-2013) and Gods of the Arena (2011) included the wailing vocals as a recurring theme. Further, numerous historical documentaries in the 2000s which covered ancient Western civilizations, like Rome and ancient Greece, and Middle Eastern locales, have also featured wailing.

Baraka (1992) used the track "The Host of Seraphim" by Dead Can Dance, which features Lisa Gerrard's wailing vocals. Home (2009), an environmental-themed documentary, has also used female wailing in the soundtrack.

=== Video games ===
The wailing woman vocals made its way into video games in the 2000s, where it was predominantly featured in the Prince of Persia franchise and World of Warcraft, with some moderate usage in Metal Gear, Resident Evil, Halo, Diablo and The Legend of Zelda.

=== Music ===
"Light of Day, Day of Darkness" by Norwegian progressive metal band Green Carnation features a several-minute segment of wailing woman vocals.

"1944" by Ukrainian singer Jamala, which represented Ukraine in the Eurovision Song Contest 2016 and won, features a section of mugham-style wailing.

== Reception ==
In 2004, film composer John Debney admitted that the wail is a fad, like many other movie music trends that were used before it, and is a "du jour" for composers in post-Gladiator cinema, adding, "I think, like anything, it just gets old."

American composer Jeff Beal associated this music technique to the success of world and new age music genres in the 1980s, where he states, "I think that was the decade where we became enamored with all sorts of indigenous gestures". He added that even prior to Gladiator, the wailing woman was "already starting to percolate up."

Music journalist Doug Adams stated, "It was such an unusual thing to have a film score where the performer was so noticeable, especially in a vocal way like that...Goldenthal would use it here and there for something that was out of control, or even Elfman." Furthermore, Adams concluded that John Williams using the moaning woman motif for Munich (2005) was comparable to "your grandpa buying a cellphone...You know everybody else has already done this..."

The wailing phenomenon is also an expression of world events at the turn of the millennium where conflict and resulting interest in the Middle East escalated, thereby influencing American filmmakers to focus on West Asia and its affiliated subjects.
