= Safari Adventure =

- First UK edition (pub. Jonathan Cape)
- Author: Willard Price
- Language: English
- Publication date: 1966

Safari Adventure is a 1966 children's book by the Canadian-born American author Willard Price featuring his "Adventure" series characters, Hal and Roger Hunt. The book was illustrated by Charles Sur.

== Plot ==
A gang of poachers led by a man named Blackbeard is killing off the wildlife in Tsavo Game reserve. The game warden, Mark Crosby, is lost about what to do. Hal and Roger help the warden by capturing 47 of the poachers and sending them off to the Mombasa jail to be tried in court, but the warden's friend, Judge Sindar Singh, is giving the criminals little or no punishment. Eventually, it is revealed that Singh is Blackbeard in disguise.

== Critical analysis ==
In 2018, James Kidd of the South China Morning Post wrote that the book "displays a sympathy for animals and conservation that feels ahead of its time."

The book has been noted by several critics and academics for its eurocentric depiction of east Africa typical of children's books of the era.
