= Elephant Adventure =

- Cover of the 1969 Knight Books edition
- Author: Willard Price
- Publisher: Jonathan Cape
- Publication date: 1964

Elephant Adventure is a 1964 children's book by the Canadian-born American author Willard Price featuring his "Adventure" series characters, Hal and Roger Hunt. It depicts Hal and Roger's attempts to capture elephants for a zoo.

== Enemies ==
Their enemies are a group of slave hunters. They kidnapped some villagers and cut an elephant's trunk when the animal resisted their capture. (Hal had to shoot the elephant, much to Roger's protest. Hal explained that they were in the jungle and no one could save the trunk. An elephant will die without a trunk). Hal and Roger and their team followed the slave hunters and were captured.

== Animal ==
During their search of the villagers, they spotted a white elephant. After they escape from the slave hunters, they return to capture the white elephant.
