= Willard Price =

American writer

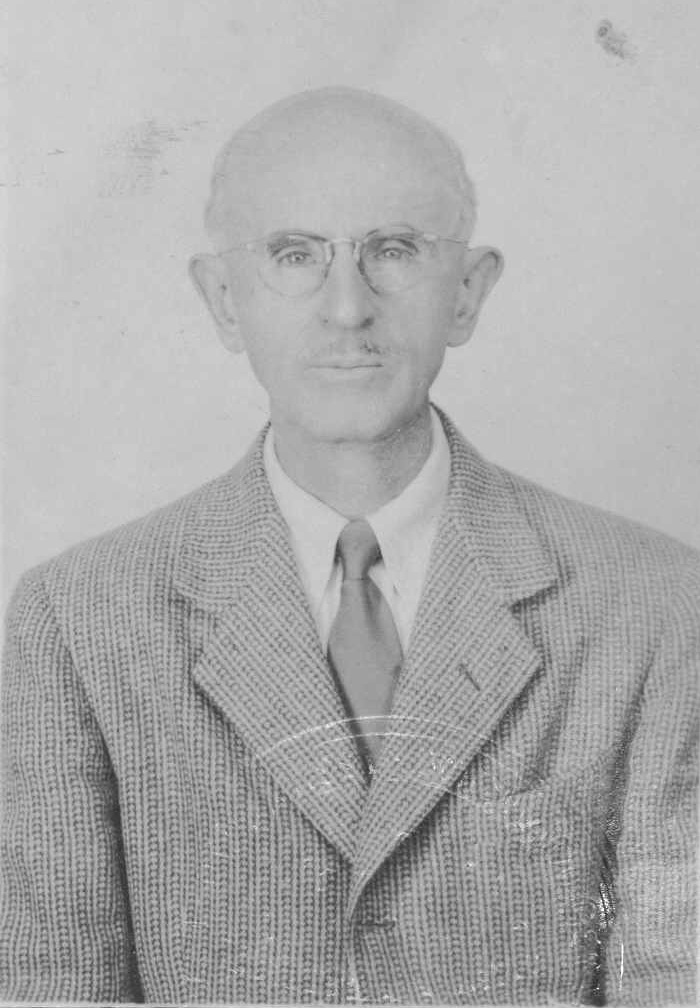
- Born: 28 July 1887; Peterborough, Ontario, Canada
- Died: 14 October 1983 (aged 96)
- Occupation: Author
- Writing career
- Genres: Children's literature Travel literature Natural history

Willard DeMille Price (28 July 1887 – 14 October 1983) was a Canadian-born American traveller, journalist and author.

== Early life ==
Price was born to a family of devout Methodists in Peterborough, Ontario. He was the nephew of Weston A. Price. When he was four years old, his father took him canoeing and fishing on Stony Lake, near his home town; he later described this as his "first great adventure." He spent some time living on his grandfather's farm before moving to Cleveland, Ohio. Price attended East High School and Western Reserve University where he funded his college degree by writing advertisements for local businesses and newspapers. During this time, he became a young Methodist leader and developed a taste for adventure on long trips during vacations.

== Early career ==
On graduating in 1909, Price confounded expectations by choosing not to enter a seminary, instead spending a year preaching as an unordained pastor. He then resolved to experience the "workaday world", a decision that took him to New York and then London. In Southwark, he developed a "painfully acute social awareness" while volunteering at a settlement house. This inspired Price to become "a social worker with a pen".

Returning to New York in 1911, Price won a scholarship to the School of Philanthropy at Columbia University, where he acquired a MA and Litt.D. While there he wrote a number of campaigning newspaper and magazine articles including a first-hand account of the squalid conditions aboard a transatlantic liner, a survey of Newark's slums and an investigation of child labour conditions in a Pittsburgh iron and steel plant (with Herschel V. Jones). Price also worked as publicity secretary of the Methodist Board of Foreign Missions, completed his thesis on immigration and edited the journals Survey and World Outlook.

== Travel and writing ==
Price spent his later life as a "foreign correspondent and roving researcher" on behalf of newspapers, magazines, museums and societies (in particular the National Geographic Society and the American Museum of Natural History). He visited a total of 148 countries and circled the globe three times before his death.

Price documented these adventures in a series of adult non-fiction books, beginning with Rip Tide in the Southern Seas (1936). His early writing career focused in particular on Japan, where he lived from 1933 to 1938 and could see first-hand the country's militarization.

In 1999, Professor Laurie Barber of New Zealand's Waikato University suggested that Price may have spied for the United States. Indeed, Price admits to having done so in My Own Life of Adventure, one of two autobiographies he wrote in his later years. What remains unclear is whether Price was on the payroll of military intelligence.

== Adventure series ==
Price's travels also provided inspiration for his popular Adventure series of novels for young readers, in which teenage zoologists Hal and Roger Hunt travel the world capturing wild animals. Price wrote the series for boys, "hoping that when they got old enough to hunt they would leave their guns at home."

Shortly before his death, Price commented that:

My aim in writing the Adventure series for young people was to lead them to read by making reading exciting and full of adventure. At the same time I want to inspire an interest in wild animals and their behavior. Judging from the letters I have received from boys and girls around the world, I believe I have helped open to them the worlds of books and natural history.

In 2006, the Price family sold the copyrights and related legal rights for the fourteen Adventure series titles, plus the right to use Price's name, to London-based Fleming Literary Management for an undisclosed six-figure sum.

== Personal life ==
Price married Eugenia Reeve in 1914. They had one son. Eugenia died in 1928. Price later married Mary Selden, who would accompany him on many of his travels throughout the world.

== Select bibliography ==
=== Adventure series ===
- Amazon Adventure (1949)
- South Sea Adventure (1952)
- Underwater Adventure (1954)
- Volcano Adventure (1956)
- Whale Adventure (1960)
- African Adventure (1963)
- Elephant Adventure (1964)
- Safari Adventure (1966)
- Lion Adventure (1967)
- Gorilla Adventure (1969)
- Diving Adventure (1970)
- Cannibal Adventure (1972)
- Tiger Adventure (1979)
- Arctic Adventure (1980)

=== Other novels ===
- Barbarian (1941)

=== Adult travel books ===
- A Real Revolution in China (1914)
- Ancient Peoples at New Tasks (1918, for the Missionary Education Movement)
- The Negro Around the World (1925)
- American Influence in the Orient (1927)
- The South Sea Adventure: Through Japan’s Equatorial Empire (1936, published in the US as Pacific Adventure; published in London as Rip Tide in the South Seas)
  - Second edition: Japan's Islands of Mystery (1944)
- Japan's New Horizons (1938)
- Where Are You Going, Japan? (1938, originally announced as Japan Reaches Out; published in the US as Children of the Rising Sun)
- Japan Rides the Tiger (1942)
- Japan and the Son of Heaven (1945)
- Key to Japan (1946)
- Roving South: Rio Grande to Patagonia (1952)
- Journey by Junk: Japan After MacArthur (1953)
- The Amazing Amazon (1954)
- Adventures in Paradise: Tahiti and Beyond (1955)
- Innocents in Britain (1958, US title: Roaming Britain: 8000 Miles Through England, Scotland and Wales)
- Incredible Africa (1962)
- The Amazing Mississippi (1963)
- Rivers I Have Known (1965)
- America's Paradise Lost (1966)
- Odd Way Round the World (1969)
- The Japanese Miracle and Peril (1971)

== Select magazine articles ==
- The Christian Herald [25 April 1925]. "Experiences of an Amateur Immigrant"
- Country Home [July 1935]. "The Wild West in the Far East"
- Harper's Magazine [April 1936]. "Japan in the Philippines"
- Natural History [vol.7, no. 5, May 1935]. "Big Money of Yap"
- Harper's Magazine [September 1936]. "Japan's New Outposts"
- Harper's Magazine [December 1936]. "Japanning China"
- National Geographic Magazine [April 1937]. "Grand Canal Panorama"
- Harper's Magazine [September 1937]. "Korea from a Nunnary Window"
- The New Republic [November 1937]. "Japan's 'Devine Mission'"
- National Geographic Magazine [April 1937]. "Grand Canal Panorama"
- National Geographic Magazine [April 1940]. "By Felucca Down the Nile"
- Harper's Magazine [June 1941]. "The Emperor Next Door"
- Harper's Magazine [November 1942]. "The Men Who Drive Japan"
- Harper's Magazine [March 1942]. "America's Enemy no. 2"
- National Geographic Magazine [August 1942]. "Unknown Japan"
- Natural History [vol. 53, no.3, March 1944]. "Will the Pacific be Brown or Yellow?"
- The Rotarian [April 1944]. "River with a Broad Back"
- National Geographic Magazine [October 1945]. "Japs Rule in the Hermit Nation"
- National Geographic Magazine [November 1945]. "Behind the Mask of Modern Japan"
- National Geographic Magazine [November 1953]. "Cruising Japan's Inland Sea"
- National Geographic Magazine [July 1958]. "The Thames Mirrors England's Varied Life"
- National Geographic Magazine [November 1958]. "The Upper Mississippi: Between Lake Itasca and Cairo, Old Man River Grows Up"
- National Geographic Magazine [November 1960]. "Old Big Strong: The Lower Mississippi"
