= Garden design =

Designing plans for layout and planting of gardens

Garden design is the art and process of designing and creating plans for layout and planting of gardens and landscapes. Garden design may be done by the garden owner themselves, or by professionals of varying levels of experience and expertise. Most professional garden designers have some training in horticulture and the principles of design. Some are also landscape architects, a more formal level of training that usually requires an advanced degree and often a state license. Amateur gardeners may also attain a high level of experience from extensive hours working in their own gardens, through casual study, serious study in Master gardener programs, or by joining gardening clubs.

== Elements ==
Whether gardens are designed by a professional or an amateur, certain principles form the basis of effective garden design, resulting in the creation of gardens to meet the needs, goals, and desires of the users or owners of the gardens.

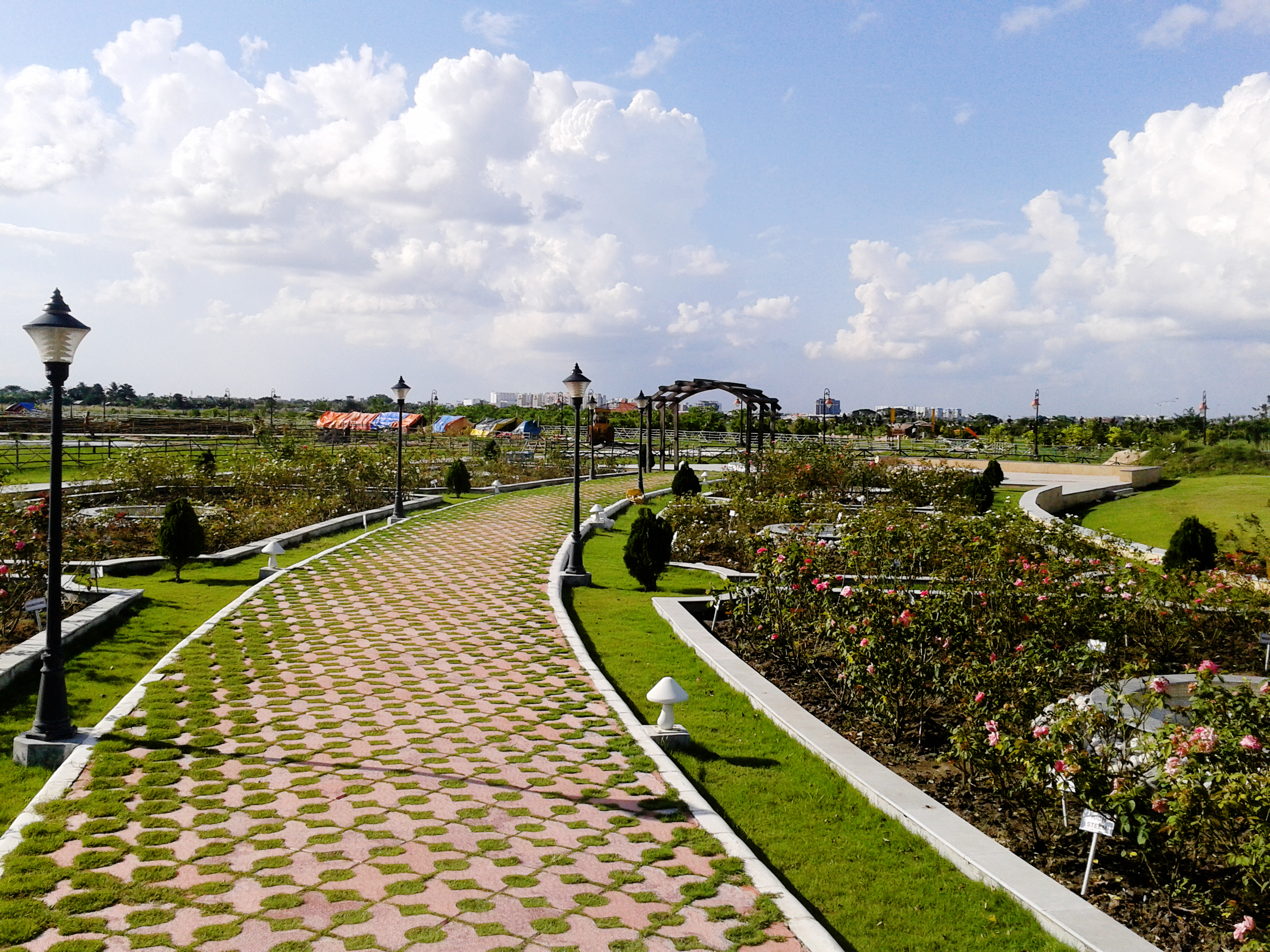
Curved garden paths are a common form of hardscaping

Elements of garden design include the layout of hardscape such as paths, walls, water features, sitting areas and decking, and the softscape, that is, the plants themselves, with consideration for their horticultural requirements, their season-to-season appearance, lifespan, growth habit, size, speed of growth, and combinations with other plants and landscape features. Consideration is also given to the maintenance needs of the garden, including the time or funds available for regular maintenance, which can affect the choice of plants in terms of speed of growth, spreading or self-seeding of the plants, whether annual or perennial, bloom-time, and many other characteristics.

Important considerations in the garden design include how the garden will be used, the desired stylistic genre (formal or informal, modern or traditional, etc.), and the way the garden space will connect to the home or other structures in the surrounding areas. All of these considerations are subject to the limitations of the prescribed budget.

=== Location ===
A garden's location can have a substantial influence on its design. Topographical landscape features such as steep slopes, vistas, hills, and outcrops may suggest or determine aspects of design such as layout and can be used and augmented to create a particular impression. The soils of the site will affect what types of plant may be grown, as will the garden's climate zone and various microclimates. The locational context of the garden can also influence its design. For example, an urban setting may require a different design style in contrast to a rural one. Similarly, a windy coastal location may necessitate a different treatment compared to a sheltered inland site.

=== Soil ===
The quality of a garden's soil can have a significant influence on a garden's design and its subsequent success. Soil influences the availability of water and nutrients, the activity of soil micro-organisms, and temperature within the root zone, and thus may have a determining effect on the types of plants which will grow successfully in the garden. However, soils may be replaced or improved to make them more suitable.

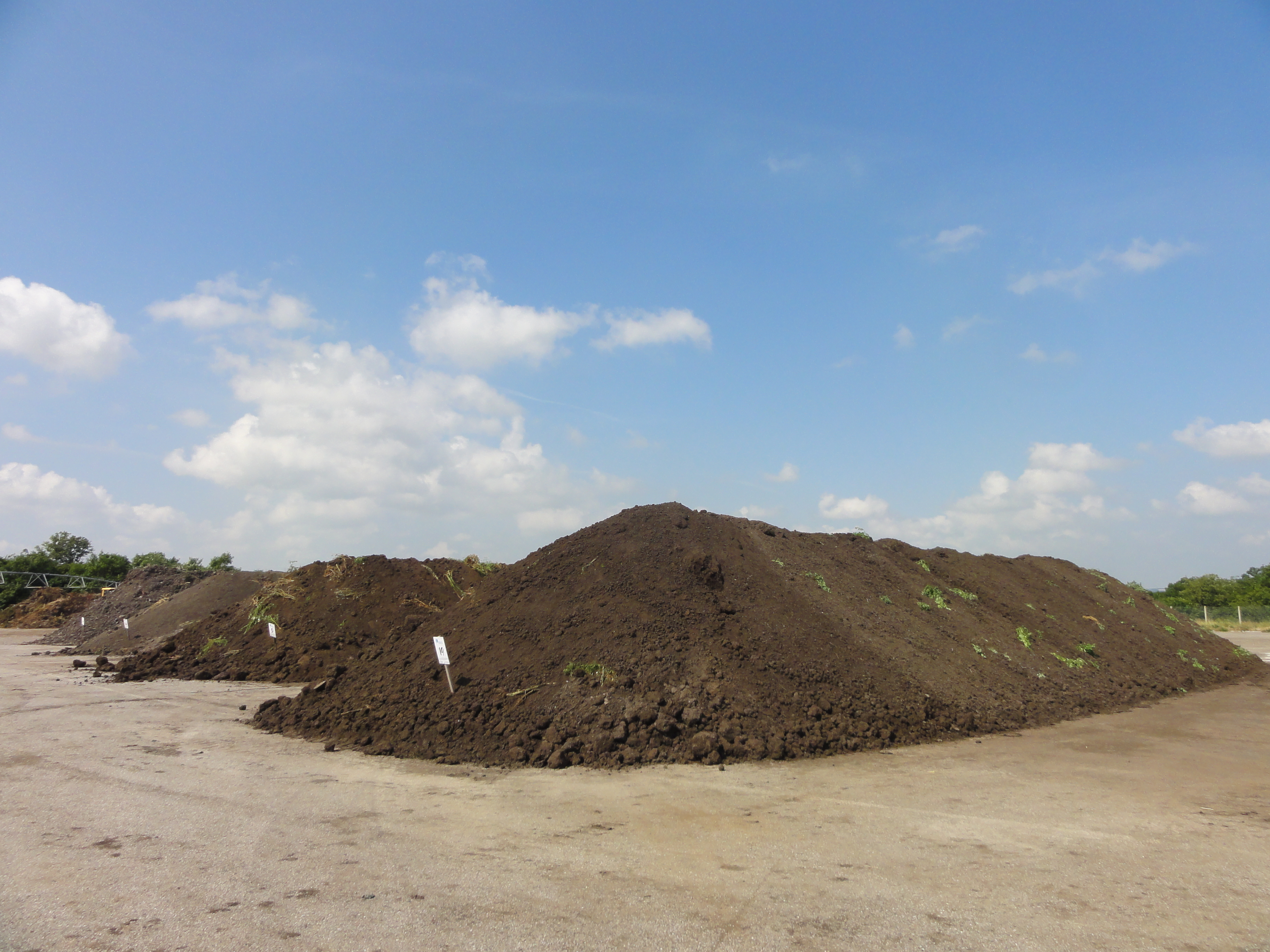
Alignment of several compost piles on a composting facility in France

Traditionally, garden soil is improved by amendment, the process of adding beneficial materials to the native subsoil and particularly the topsoil. The added materials, which may consist of compost, peat, sand, mineral dust, or manure, among others, are mixed with the soil to the preferred depth. The amount and type of amendment may depend on many factors, including the amount of existing soil humus, the soil structure (clay, silt, sand, loam, etc.), the soil acidity/alkalinity, and the choice of plants to be grown. One source states that, "conditioning the soil thoroughly before planting enables the plants to establish themselves quickly and so play their part in the design." However, not all gardens are, or should be, amended in this manner, since many plants prefer an impoverished soil. In this case, poor soil is better than a rich soil that has been artificially enriched.

=== Boundaries ===
The design of a garden can be affected by the nature of its boundaries, both external and internal. In turn, the design can influence the boundaries, including through creation of new ones. Planting can be used to modify an existing boundary line by softening or widening it. The introduction of internal boundaries can help divide a garden into smaller areas.

The main types of boundary within a garden are hedges, walls, and fences. A hedge may be evergreen or deciduous, formal or informal, short or tall, depending on the style of the garden and purpose of the boundary. A wall has a strong foundation beneath it at all points, and is usually – though not always – built from brick, stone or concrete blocks. A fence differs from a wall in that it is anchored only at intervals, and is usually constructed from wood or metal (such as iron or wire mesh).

Boundaries may be constructed for several reasons: to keep out livestock or intruders, to provide privacy, to create shelter from strong winds and establish micro-climates, to screen unattractive structures or views, and to create an element of surprise.

=== Surfaces ===
In temperate western gardens, a smooth expanse of lawn is often considered essential to a garden. However, garden designers may use other surfaces, for example those "made up of loose gravel, small pebbles, or wood chips" to create a different appearance and feel. Designers may also use the contrast in texture and color between different surfaces to create an overall pattern in the design.

Surfaces for paths and access points are chosen for practical as well as aesthetic reasons. Issues such as safety, maintenance and durability may need to be considered by the designer. Gardens designed for public access need to cope with heavier foot traffic and hence may use surfaces – such as resin-bonded gravel – that are rarely used in private gardens.

Naturalistic planting design

=== Planting design ===
Planting design requires design talent and aesthetic judgement combined with a good level of horticultural, ecological and cultural knowledge. It includes two major traditions: formal rectilinear planting design (Persia and Europe); and formal asymmetrical (Asia) and naturalistic planting design.

==== History ====
Persian gardens are credited with originating aesthetic and diverse planting design. A correct Persian garden will be divided into four sectors with water being very important for both irrigation and aesthetics. The four sectors symbolize the Zoroastrian elements of sky, earth, water and plants. Planting in ancient and Medieval European gardens was often a mix of herbs for medicinal use, vegetables for consumption, and flowers for decoration. Purely aesthetic planting layouts developed after the medieval period in Renaissance gardens, as are shown in late-Renaissance paintings and plans. The designs of the Italian Renaissance garden were geometrical and plants were used to form spaces and patterns. The gardens of the French Renaissance and Baroque jardin à la française era continued the formal garden planting aesthetic.

In Asia the asymmetrical traditions of planting design in Chinese gardens and Japanese gardens originated in the Jin dynasty (266–420) of China. The gardens' plantings have a controlled but naturalistic aesthetic. In Europe the arrangement of plants in informal groups developed as part of the English Landscape Garden style, and subsequently the French landscape garden, and was strongly influenced by the picturesque art movement.

==== Application ====
A planting plan gives specific instructions, often for a contractor about how the soil is to be prepared, what species are to be planted, what size and spacing is to be used and what maintenance operations are to be carried out under the contract. Owners of private gardens may also use planting plans, not for contractual purposes, as an aid to thinking about a design and as a record of what has been planted. A planting strategy is a long-term strategy for the design, establishment and management of different types of vegetation in a landscape or garden.

Planting can be established by directly employed gardeners and horticulturalists or it can be established by a landscape contractor (also known as a landscape gardener). Landscape contractors work to drawings and specifications prepared by garden designers or landscape architects.

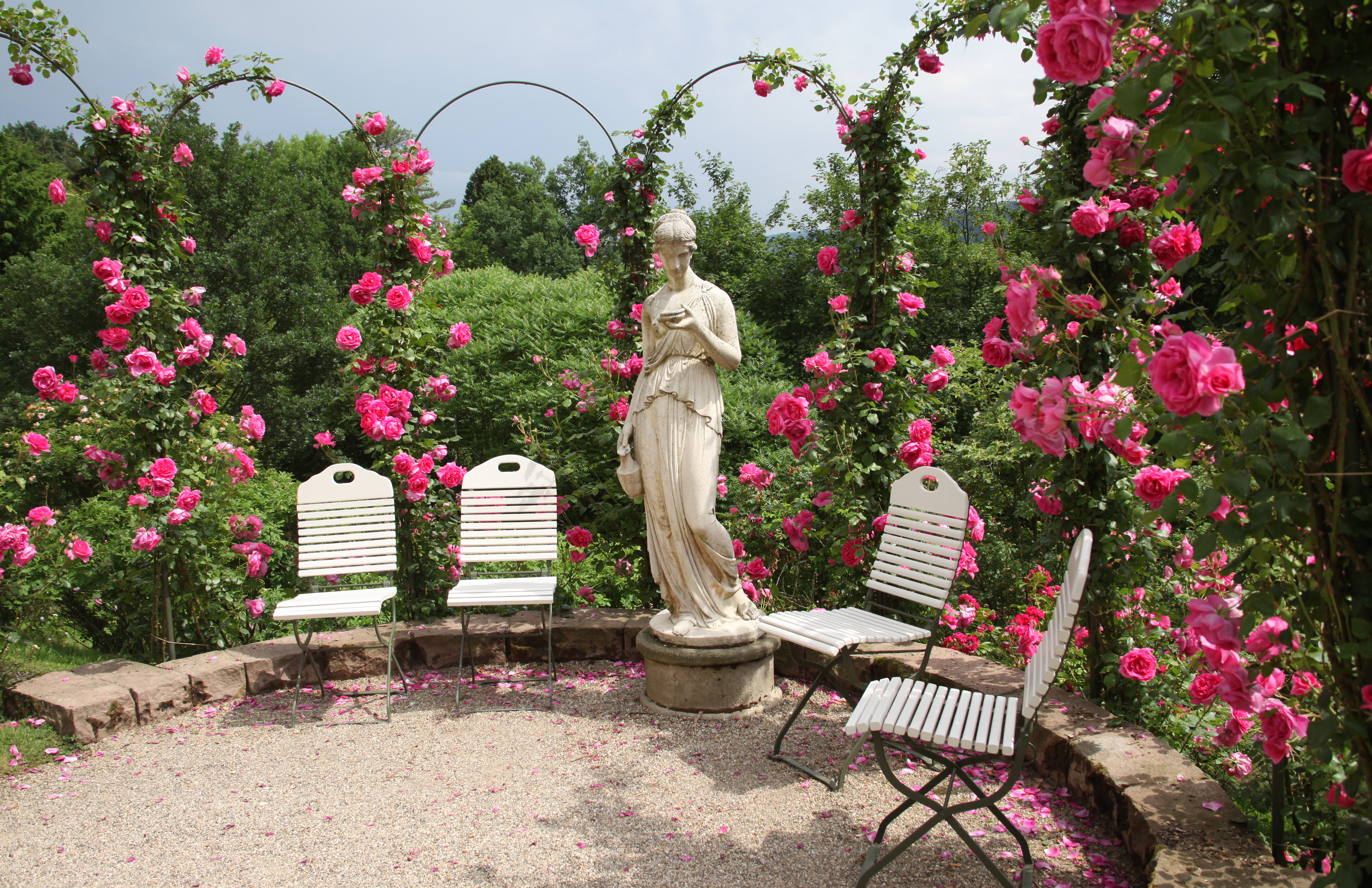
Garden chairs in Rosenneuheitengarten Beutig in Baden-Baden, Germany

=== Garden furniture ===
Garden furniture may range from a patio set consisting of a table, four or six chairs and a parasol, through benches, swings, various lighting, to stunning artifacts in brutal concrete or weathered oak. Patio heaters, that run on bottled butane or propane, are often used to enable people to sit outside at night or in cold weather. A picnic table is used for the purpose of eating a meal outdoors such as in a garden room. The materials used to manufacture modern patio furniture include stones, metals, vinyl, plastics, resins, glass, and treated woods.

=== Lighting ===
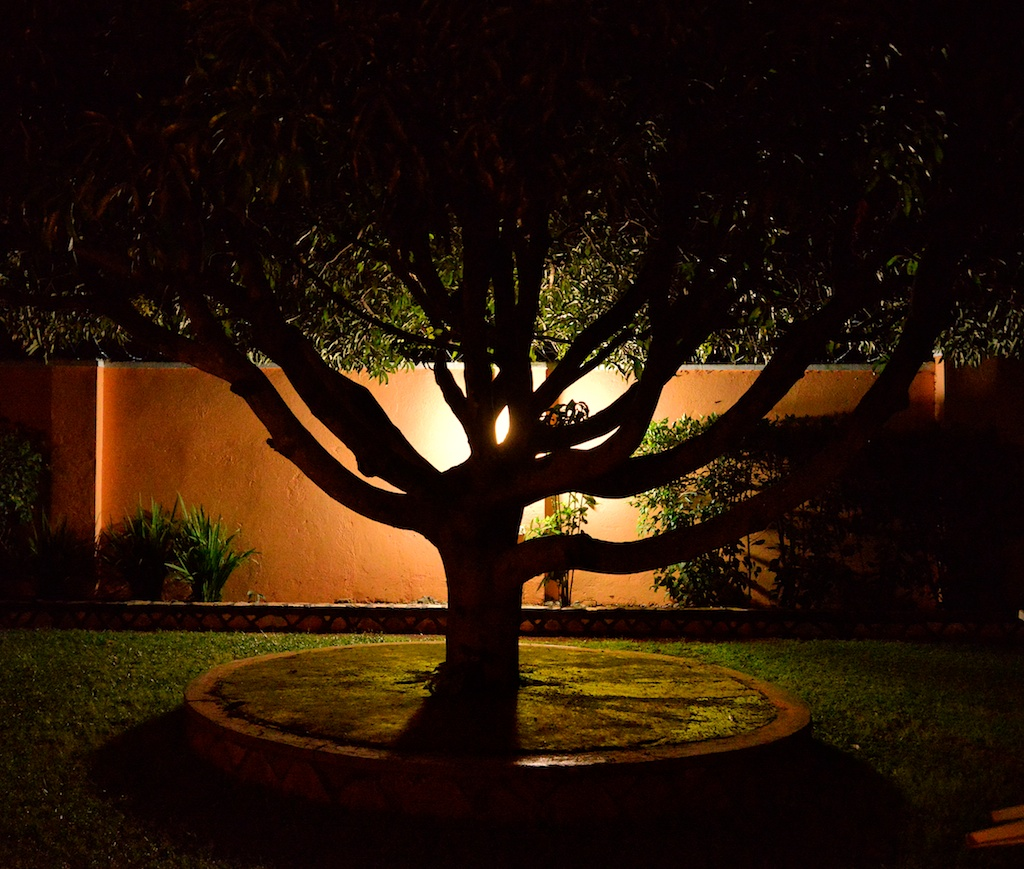
Garden lighting in Kampala, Uganda

Garden lighting can be an important aspect of garden design. In most cases, various types of lighting techniques may be classified and defined by heights: safety lighting, uplighting, and downlighting. Safety lighting is the most practical application. However, it is more important to determine the type of lamps and fittings needed to create the desired effects.

Light regulates three major plant processes: photosynthesis, phototropism, and photoperiodism. Photosynthesis provides the energy required to produce the energy source of plants. Phototropism is the effect of light on plant growth that causes the plant to grow toward or away from the light. Photoperiodism is a plant's response or capacity to respond to photoperiod, a recurring cycle of light and dark periods of constant length.

=== Sunlight ===
While sunlight is not always easily controlled by the gardener, it is an important element of garden design. The amount of available light is a critical factor in determining what plants may be grown. Sunlight will, therefore, have a substantial influence on the character of the garden. For example, a rose garden is generally not successful in full shade, while a garden of hostas may not thrive in hot sun. As another example, a vegetable garden may need to be placed in a sunny location, and if that location is not ideal for the overall garden design goals, the designer may need to change other aspects of the garden.

In some cases, the amount of available sunlight can be influenced by the gardener. The location of trees, other shade plants, garden structures, or, when designing an entire property, even buildings, might be selected or changed based on their influence in increasing or reducing the amount of sunlight provided to various areas of the property. In other cases, the amount of sunlight is not under the gardener's control. Nearby buildings, plants on other properties, or simply the climate of the local area, may limit the available sunlight. Or, substantial changes in the light conditions of the garden may not be within the gardener's means. In this case, it is important to plan a garden that is compatible with the existing light conditions.

== Notable garden designers ==
- Arit Anderson
- Isabel Bannerman
- Chris Beardshaw
- Emma Clark
- Sarah Eberle
- Adam Frost
- Diarmuid Gavin
- Dominique Girard
- Gertrude Jekyll
- Geoffrey Jellicoe
- Lawrence Johnston
- William Martin
- Shunmyō Masuno
- Piet Oudolf
- Russell Page
- Dan Pearson
- James Russell
- Diego Suarez
- Hirofumi Suga
- Joe Swift
- Roger Turner
- Cleve West
- Andrew Wilson

== Types of gardens ==
=== Islamic gardens ===
Many Islamic garden traditions trace their roots to the Paradise gardens of Ancient Persia, the earliest examples of which are at Pasargadae. They evolved over centuries, by different cultures and dynasties, in Asia, North Africa, and the Iberian Peninsula.

==== Examples ====
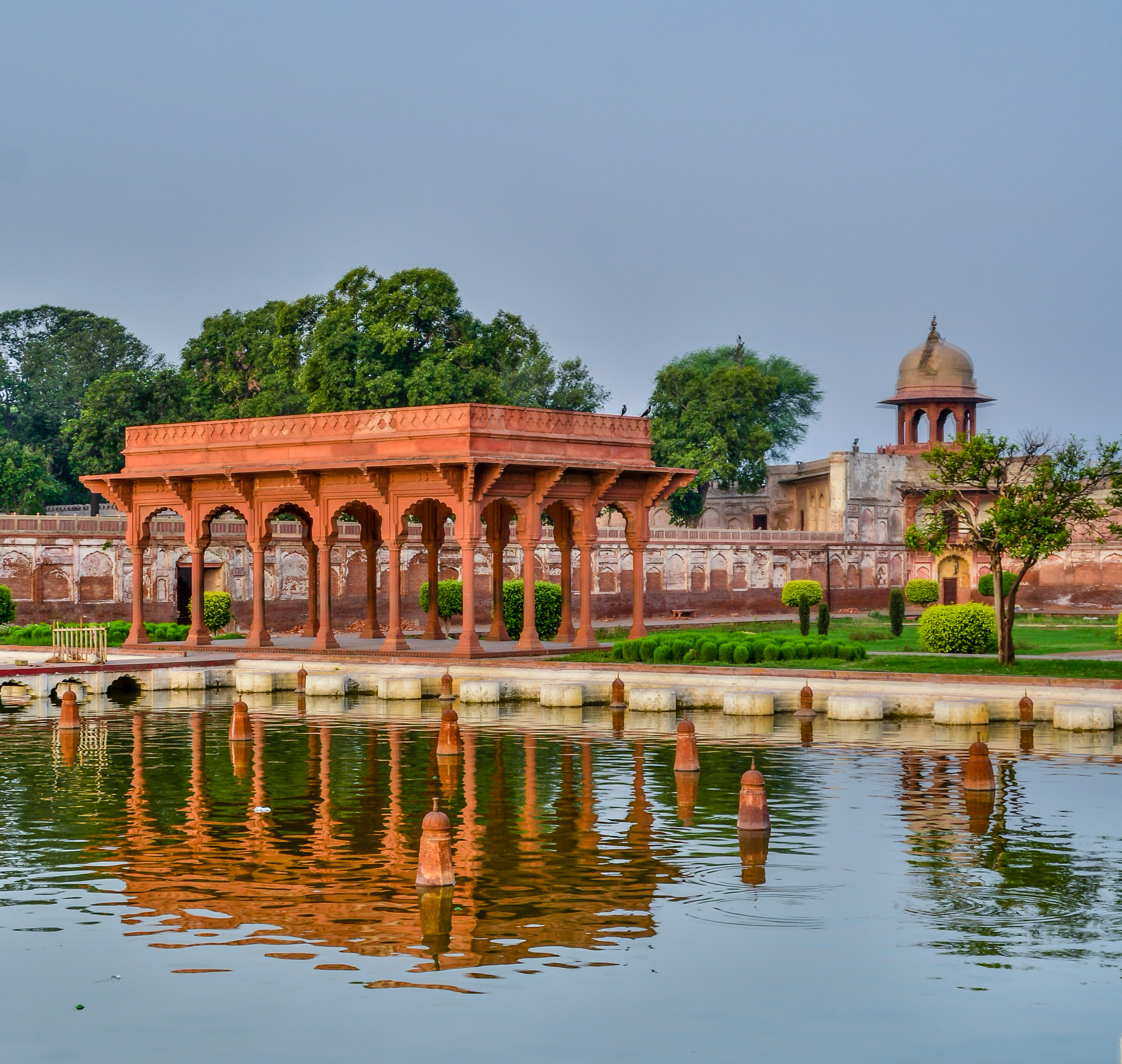
The Shalamar Gardens, Lahore, Pakistan

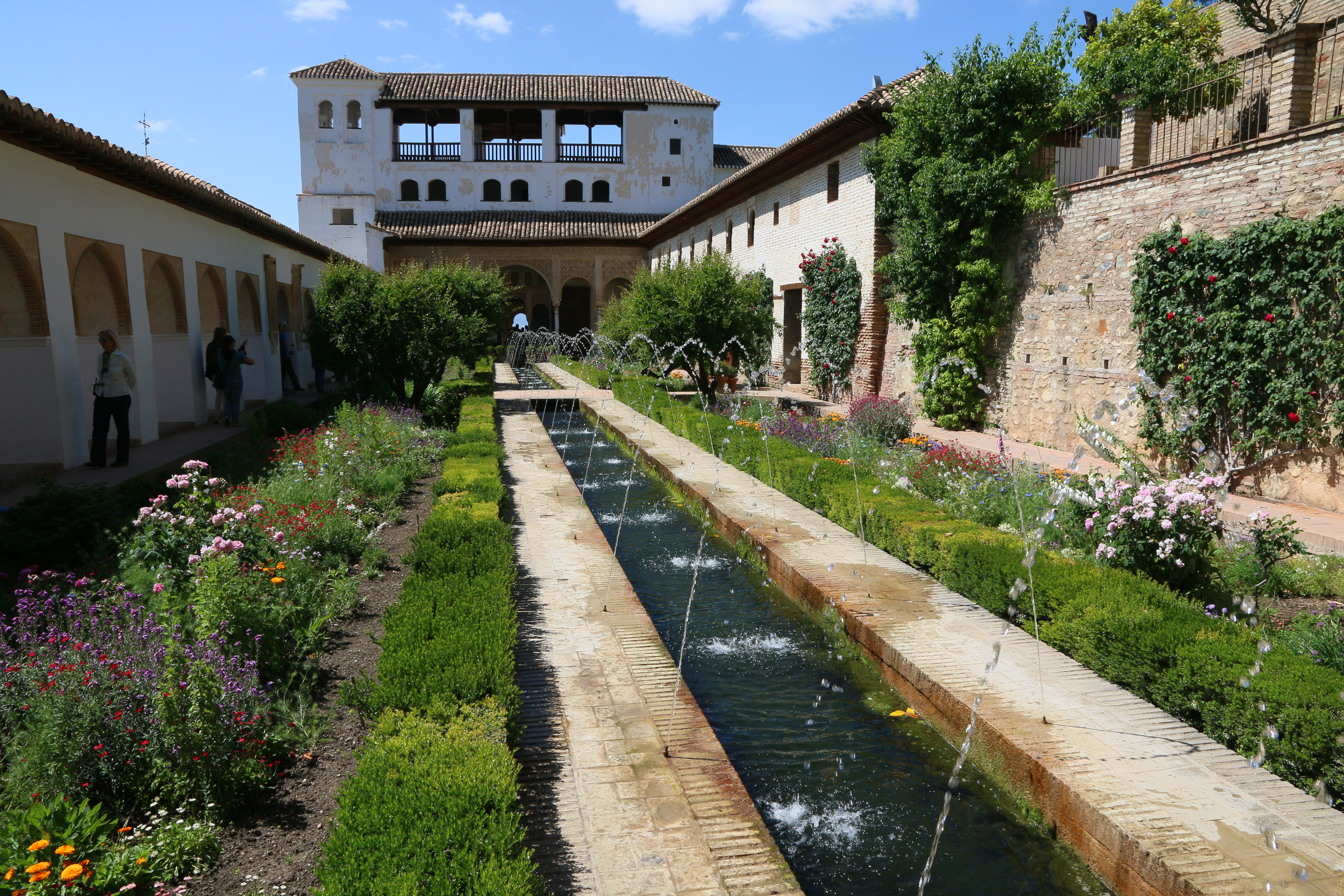
Inspired by Islamic/Moorish gardens, the Patio de la Acequia (Courtyard of the Canal), Generalife, Granada, Spain

Some styles and examples include:

- Persian gardens

- Dowlatabad Garden
- Eram Garden
- Fin Garden
- Shazdeh Garden

- Mughal gardens

- Nishat Bagh
- Shalamar Gardens, Lahore
- Yadavindra Gardens

- Charbagh

- Taj Mahal
- Humayun's tomb gardens

- Bagh (garden)

- Bagh-e Babur
- Shalimar Bagh, Srinagar

- Al-Andalus—Moorish architecture and gardens

- Alcázar of Seville
- Alhambra
- Generalife

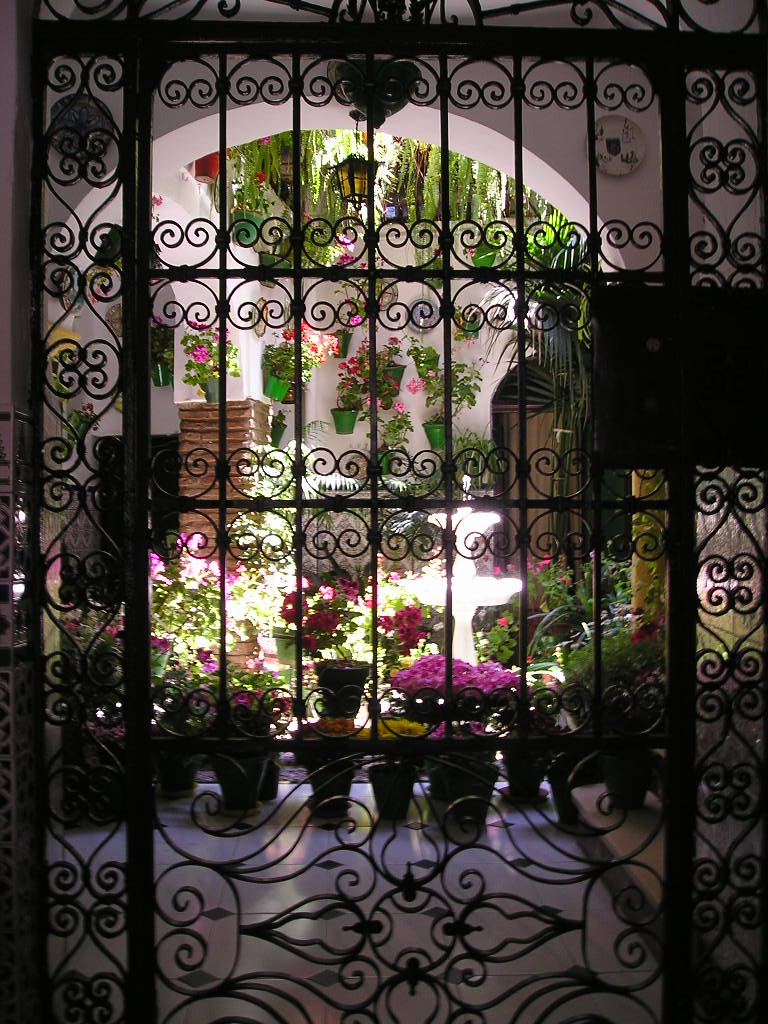
Andalusian Patio of Córdoba, Spain

=== Mediterranean gardens ===
Garden design history and precedents from the Mediterranean region include:

- Ancient Greek and Hellenistic gardens
- Ancient Roman gardens

- Peristyle gardens – evolved into Monastic gardens
- House of the Vettii – in Pompeii
- Horti Sallustiani

- Byzantine gardens
- Spanish gardens

- Andalusian patio

=== Renaissance formal gardens ===
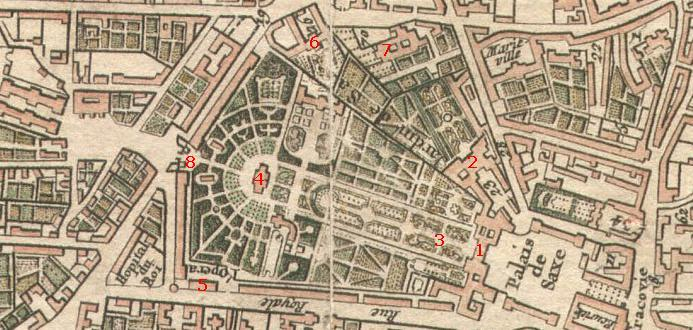
Jardin de Saxe (Plan of the Saxon Garden)

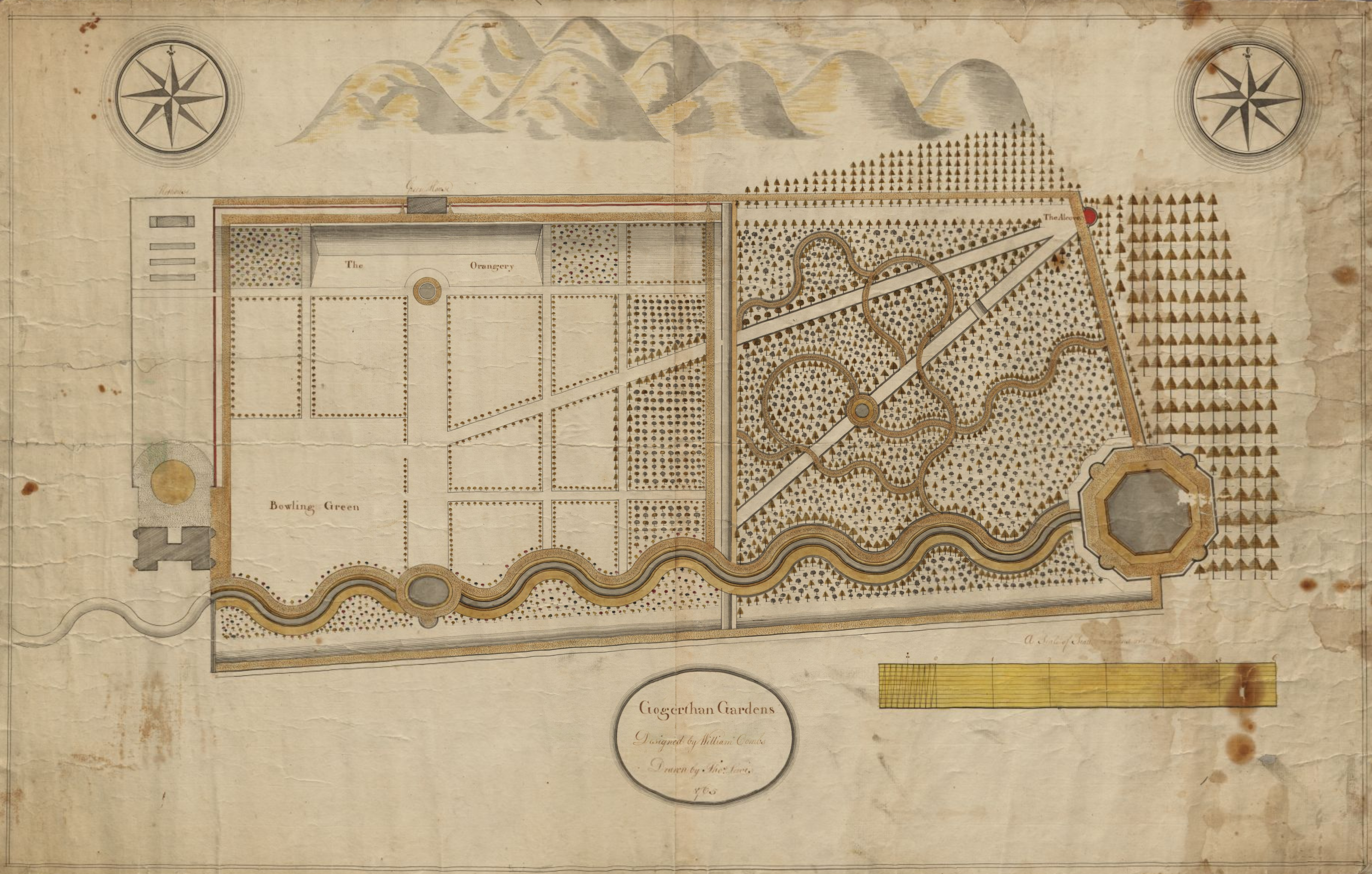
A plan of a formal garden for a country estate in Wales, 1765

A formal garden in the Persian and European garden design traditions is rectilinear and axial in design. The equally formal garden, without axial symmetry (asymmetrical) or other geometries, is the garden design tradition of Chinese and Japanese gardens. The Zen garden of rocks, moss and raked gravel is an example. The Western model is an ordered garden laid out in carefully planned geometric and often symmetrical lines. Lawns and hedges in a formal garden need to be kept neatly clipped for maximum effect. Trees, shrubs, subshrubs and other foliage are carefully arranged, shaped and continually maintained.

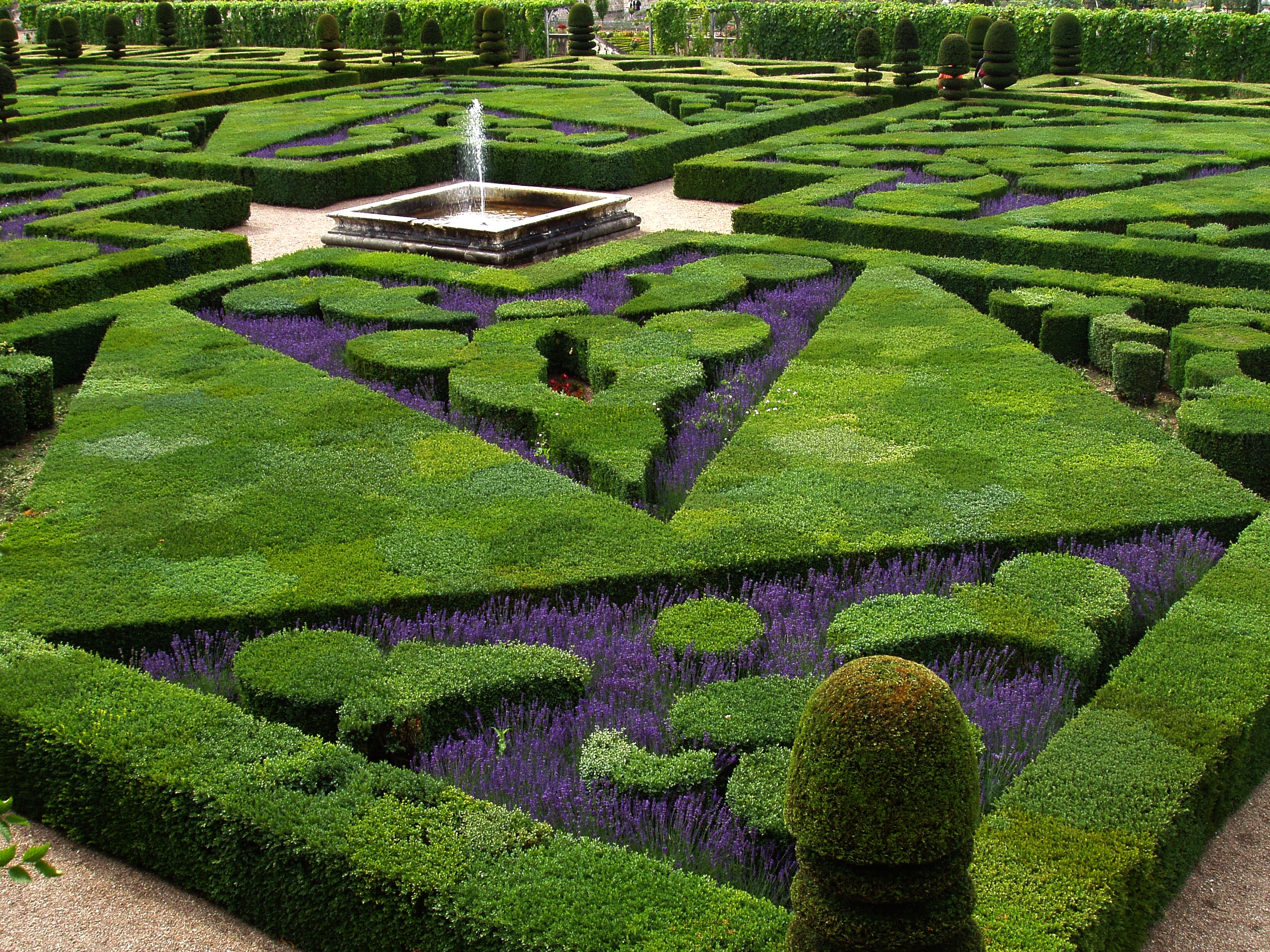
French formal garden and parterre at Château de Villandry in the Loire Valley

A French formal garden or jardin à la française, is a specific kind of formal garden, laid out in the manner of André Le Nôtre; it is centered on the façade of a building, with radiating avenues and paths of gravel, lawns, parterres and pools (bassins) of reflective water enclosed in geometric shapes by stone coping, with fountains and sculpture. The French formal garden style has origins in fifteenth-century Italian Renaissance garden, such as the Villa d'Este, Boboli Gardens, and Villa Lante in Italy. The style was brought to France and expressed in the gardens of the French Renaissance. Some of the earliest formal parterres of clipped evergreens were those laid out at Anet by Claude Mollet, the founder of a dynasty of nurserymen-designers that lasted deep into the 18th century. The Gardens of Versailles are an ultimate example of jardin à la française, composed of many different distinct gardens, and designed by André Le Nôtre.

English Renaissance gardens in a rectilinear formal design were a feature of the stately homes. The introduction of the parterre was at Wilton House in the 1630s. In the early eighteenth century, the publication of Dezallier d'Argenville, La théorie et la pratique du jardinage (1709) was translated into English and German, and was the central document for the later formal gardens of Continental Europe.

Traditional formal Spanish garden design evolved with Persian garden and European Renaissance garden influences. The internationally renowned Alhambra and Generalife in Granada, built in the Moorish Al-Andalus era, have influenced design for centuries. The Ibero-American Exposition of 1929 World's Fair in Seville, Spain was located in the celebrated Maria Luisa Park (Parque de Maria Luisa) designed by Jean-Claude Nicolas Forestier.

Formal gardening in the Italian and French manners was reintroduced at the turn of the twentieth century. Beatrix Farrand's formal Italian garden areas at Dumbarton Oaks in Washington, D.C., and Achille Duchêne's restored French water parterre at Blenheim Palace in England are examples of the modern formal garden. The Conservatory Garden in Central Park of New York City features a formal garden, as do many other parks and estates such as Filoli in California.

The simplest formal garden would be a box-trimmed hedge lining or enclosing a carefully laid out flowerbed or garden bed of simple geometric shape, such as a knot garden. The more developed and elaborate formal gardens contain statuary and fountains.

Features in a formal garden may include:

- Avenue
- Bosquet
- Broderie
- Eyecatchers
- Garden sculpture
- Hedge maze
- Jeux d'eau
- Orangery
- Parterre
- Pavilion
- Pergola
- Reflecting pool
- Sylvan theater
- Terrace
- Topiary
- Trellis

=== English Landscape and Naturalistic gardens ===
The English landscape garden style practically swept away the geometries of earlier English and European Renaissance formal gardens. William Kent and Lancelot "Capability" Brown were leading proponents, among many other designers. The naturalistic English garden style (French: Jardin anglais, Italian: Giardino all'inglese, German: Englischer Landschaftsgarten) of the 1730s and on transformed private and civic garden design across Europe. The French landscape garden subsequently continued the style's development on the Continent.

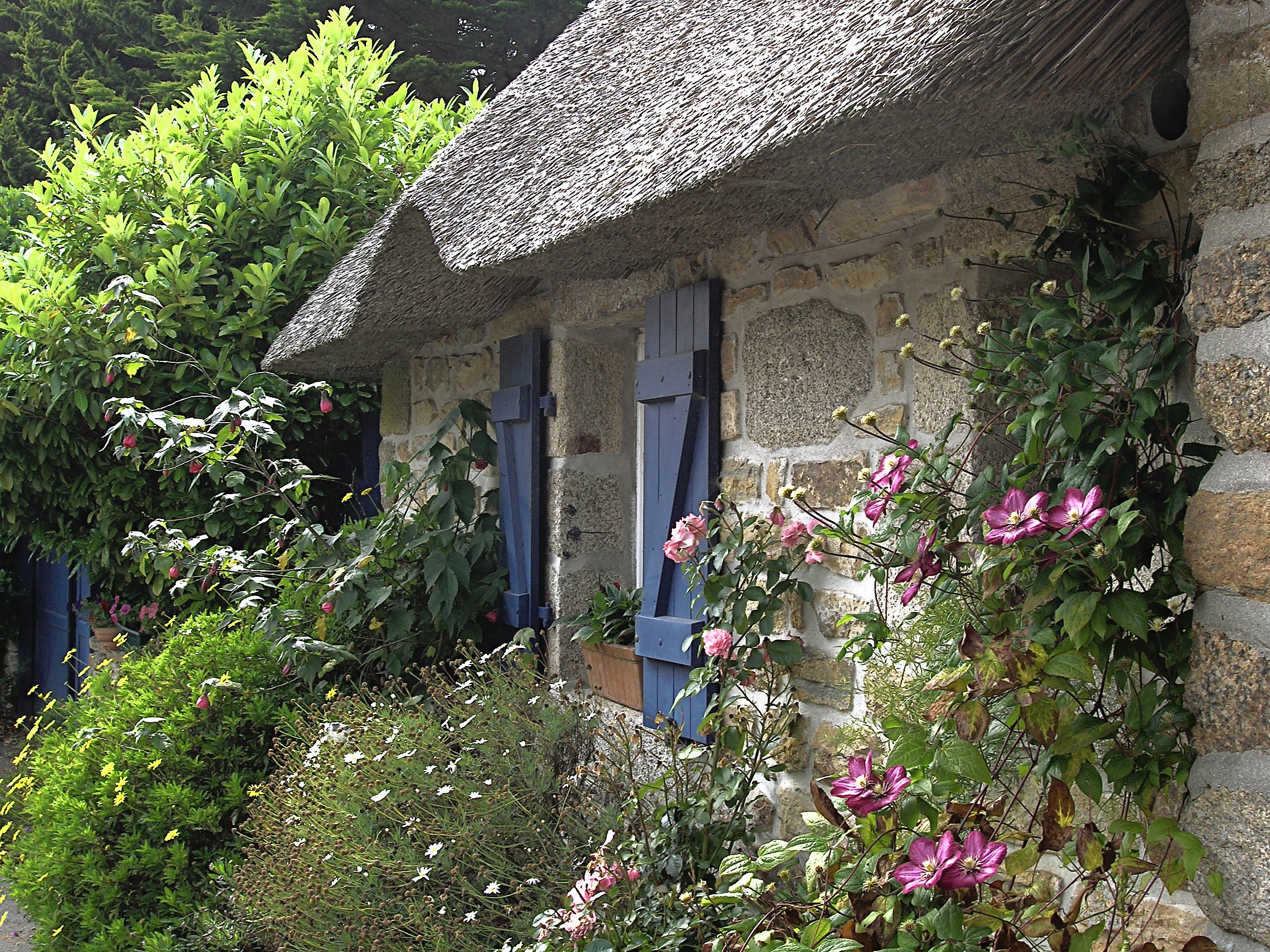
Roses, clematis, a thatched roof: a cottage garden in Brittany

=== Cottage gardens ===
A cottage garden uses an informal design, traditional materials, dense plantings, and a mixture of ornamental and edible plants. Cottage gardens go back many centuries, but their popularity grew in 1870s England in response to the more structured Victorian English estate gardens that used restrained designs with massed beds of brilliantly colored greenhouse annuals. They are more casual by design, depending on grace and charm rather than grandeur and formal structure. The influential British garden authors and designers, William Robinson at Gravetye Manor in Sussex, and Gertrude Jekyll at Munstead Wood in Surrey, both wrote and gardened in England. Jekyll's series of thematic gardening books emphasized the importance and value of natural plantings were an influence in Europe and the United States. Also influential half a century later was Margery Fish, whose surviving garden at East Lambrook Manor emphasizes, among other things, native plant life and the natural patterns produced by self-spreading and self-seeding.

The earliest cottage gardens were far more practical than modern versions—with an emphasis on vegetables and herbs, along with fruit trees, beehives, and even livestock if land allowed. Flowers were used to fill any spaces in between. Over time, flowers became more dominant. Modern day cottage gardens include countless regional and personal variations of the more traditional English cottage garden.

=== Kitchen garden or potager ===
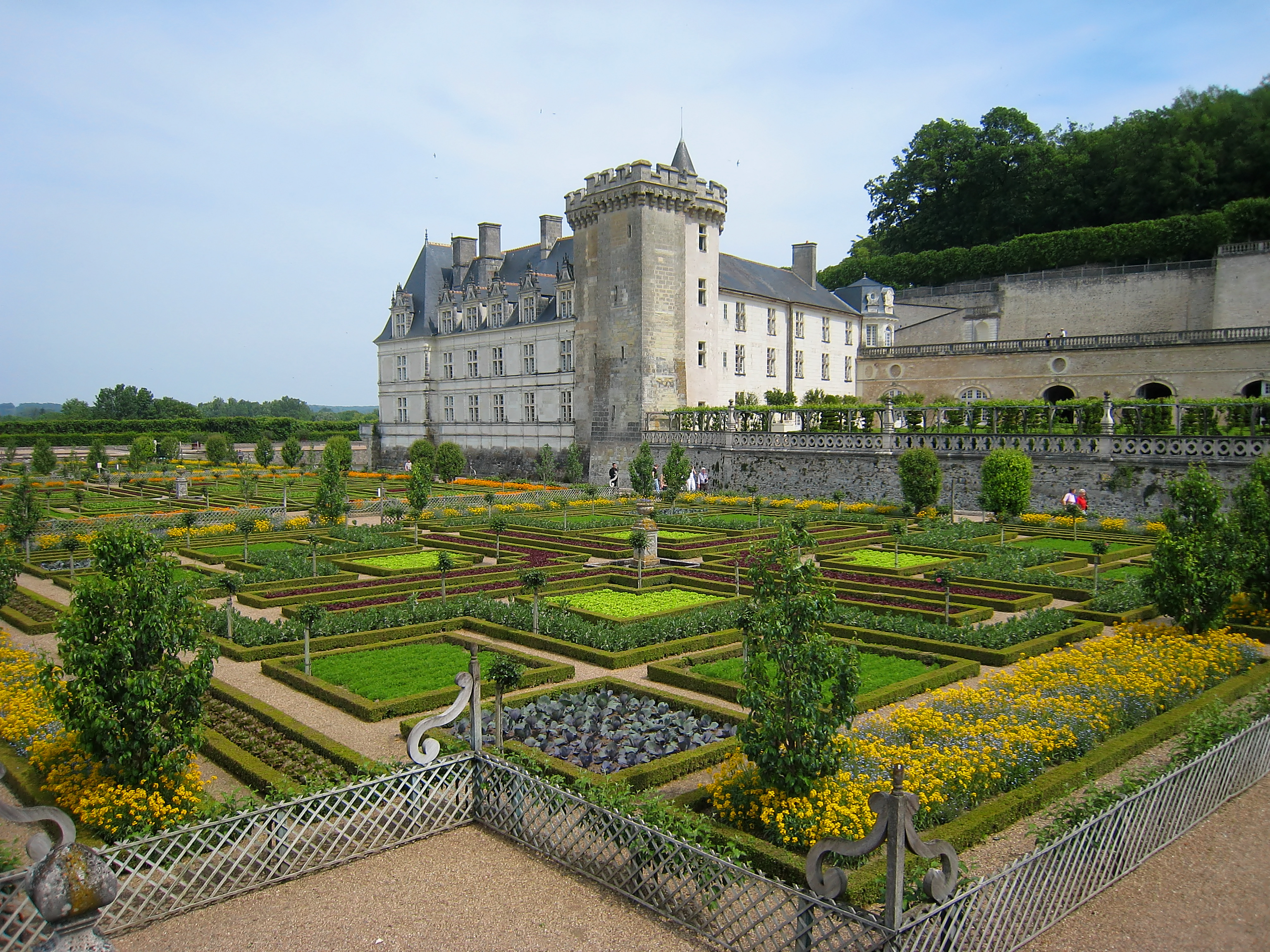
Formal potager at Villandry, France

An illustration from Walter Crane's 1906 book,Flowers from Shakespeare's Garden: a Posy from the Plays

The traditional kitchen garden, also known as a potager, is a seasonally used space separate from the rest of the residential garden – the ornamental plants and lawn areas. Most vegetable gardens are still miniature versions of old family farm plots with square or rectangular beds, but the kitchen garden is different not only in its history, but also its design.

The kitchen garden may be a landscape design feature that can be the central feature of an ornamental, all-season landscape, but can be little more than a humble vegetable plot. It is a source of herbs, vegetables, fruits, and flowers, but it is also a structured garden space, a design based on repetitive geometric patterns.

The kitchen garden has year-round visual appeal and can incorporate permanent perennials or woody plantings around (or among) the annual plants.

=== Shakespeare garden ===
A Shakespeare garden is a themed garden that cultivates plants mentioned in the works of William Shakespeare. In English-speaking countries, particularly the United States, these are often public gardens associated with parks, universities, and Shakespeare festivals. Shakespeare gardens are sites of cultural, educational, and romantic interest and can be locations for outdoor weddings.

Signs near the plants usually provide relevant quotations. A Shakespeare garden usually includes several dozen species, either in herbaceous profusion or in a geometric layout with boxwood dividers. Typical amenities are walkways and benches and a weather-resistant bust of Shakespeare. Shakespeare gardens may accompany reproductions of Elizabethan architecture. Some Shakespeare gardens also grow species typical of the Elizabethan period but not mentioned in Shakespeare's plays or poetry.

=== Rock garden ===
A rock garden, also known as rockery or alpine garden, is a type of garden that features extensive use of rocks and stones, along with plants native to rocky or alpine environments. Rock garden plants tend to be small, both because many of the species are naturally small, and so as not to cover up the rocks. They may be grown in troughs (containers), or in the ground. The plants will usually be types that prefer well-drained soil and less water.

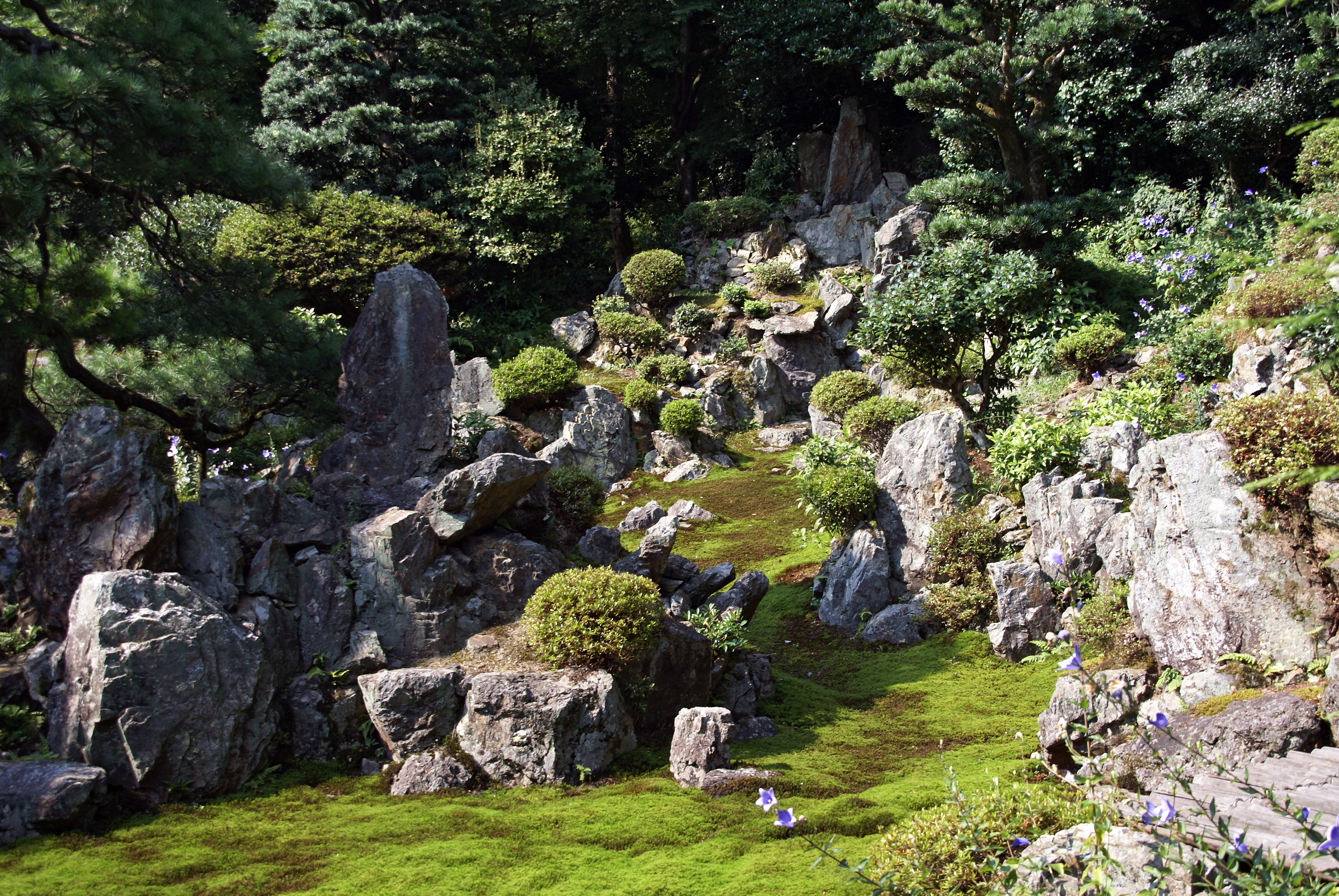
A rock garden in Seiganji, Maibara, Shiga prefecture, Japan

The usual form of a rock garden is a pile of rocks, large and small, aesthetically arranged and with small gaps between, where the plants are rooted. Some rock gardens are designed and built to look like natural outcrops of bedrock. Stones are aligned to suggest a bedding plane and plants are used to conceal the joints between the stones. This type of rock garden was popular in Victorian times, often designed and built by professional landscape architects. The same approach is sometimes used in modern campus or commercial landscaping, but can also be applied in smaller private gardens.

The Japanese rock garden, in the west often referred to as "Zen garden", is a special kind of rock garden which contains few plants. Some rock gardens incorporate bonsai.

Rock gardens have become increasingly popular as landscape features in tropical countries such as Thailand. The combination of wet weather and heavy shade trees, along with the use of heavy weed mats to stop unwanted plant growth, has made this type of arrangement ideal for both residential and commercial gardens due to its easier maintenance and drainage.

=== Native garden ===
Natural landscaping, also called native gardening, is the use of native plants, including trees, shrubs, groundcover, and grasses which are indigenous to the geographic area of the garden.

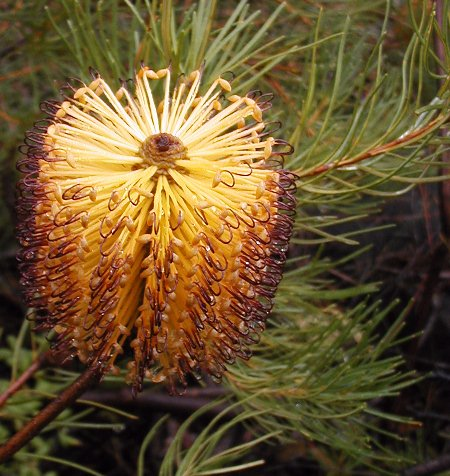
Banksia spinulosa, a Sydney local plant which attracts wildlife

Natural landscaping is adapted to the climate, geography and hydrology and should require no pesticides, fertilizers and watering to maintain, given that native plants have adapted and evolved to local conditions over thousands of years. However, these applications may be necessary for some preventive care of trees and other vegetation in areas of degraded or weedy landscapes.

Native plants suit today's interest in low-maintenance gardening and landscaping, with many species vigorous and hardy and able to survive winter cold and summer heat. Once established, they can flourish without irrigation or fertilization, and are resistant to most pests and diseases. Many municipalities have quickly recognized the benefits of natural landscaping due to municipal budget constraints and reductions and the general public is now benefiting from the implementation of natural landscaping techniques to save water and create more personal time.

Native plants provide suitable habitat for native species of butterflies, birds, pollinators, and other wildlife. They provide more variety in gardens by offering myriad alternatives to the often planted introduced species, cultivars, and invasive species. The indigenous plants have co-evolved with animals, fungi and microbes, to form a complex network of relationships. They are the foundation of their native habitats and ecosystems, or natural communities. Such gardens often benefit from the plants being evolved and habituated to the local climate, pests and herbivores, and soil conditions, and so may require fewer to no soil amendments, irrigation, pesticides, and herbicides for a lower maintenance, more sustainable landscape.

=== Contemporary garden ===
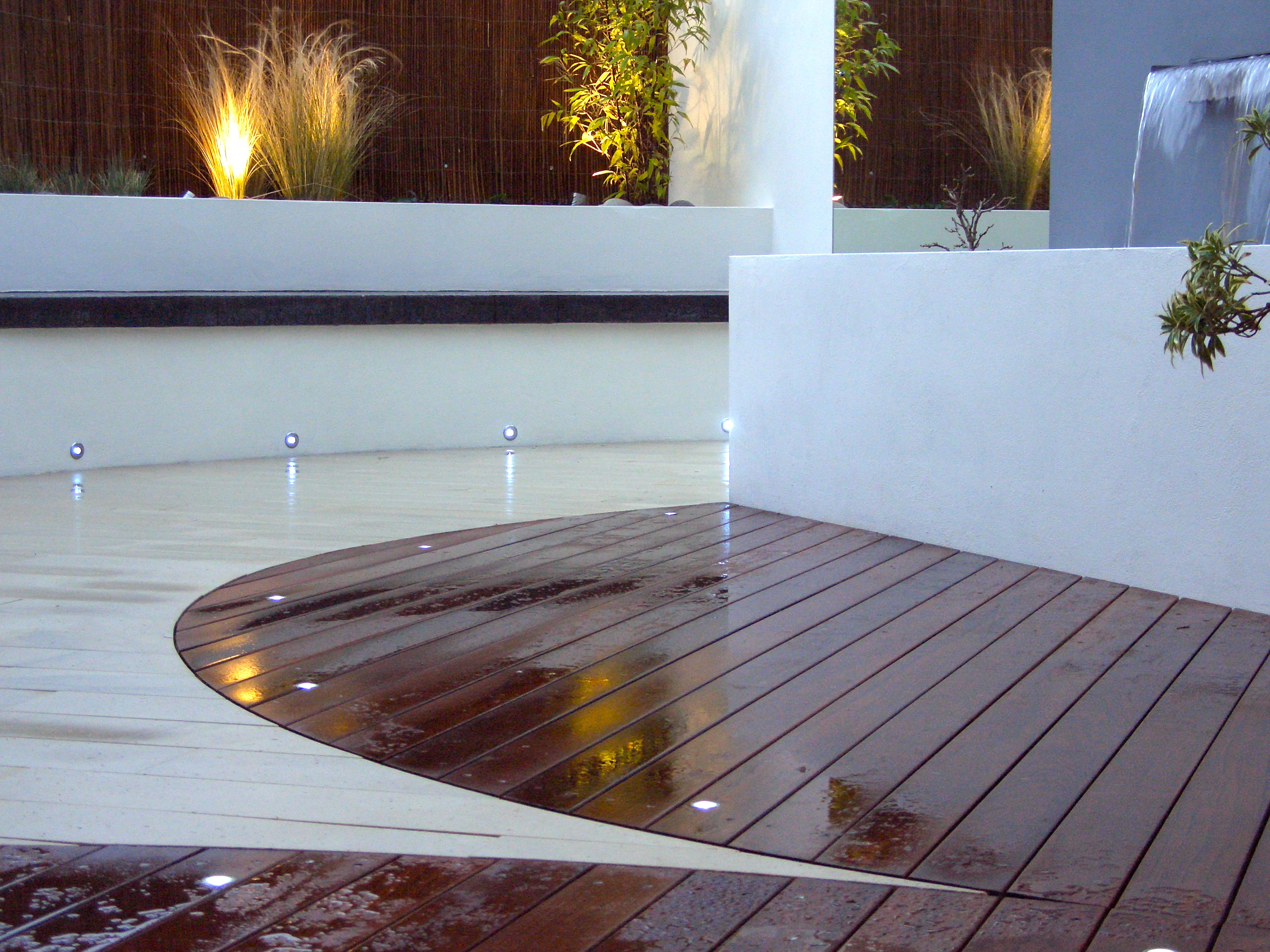
Contemporary garden

The contemporary style garden has gained popularity in the UK in the last ten years. This is partly due to the increase of modern housing with small gardens as well as the cultural shift towards contemporary design. This style of garden can be defined by the use "clean" design lines, with focus on hard landscaping materials like stone, hardwood, rendered walls.

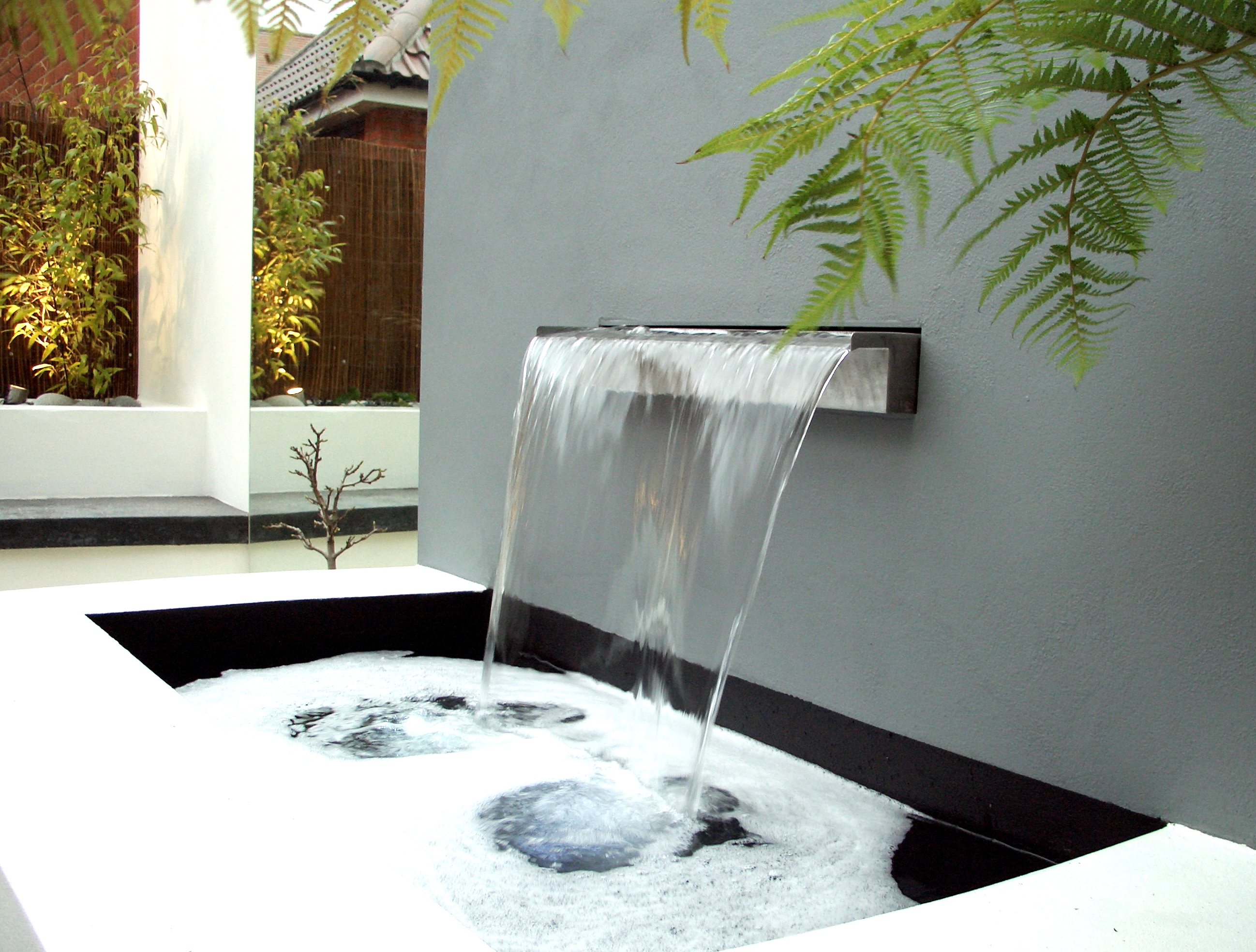
Contemporary water feature

Planting style is bold but simple with the use of drifts of one or two plants that repeat throughout the design. Grasses are a very popular choice for this style of design.

Garden lighting plays an integral role in modern garden design. Subtle lighting effects can be achieved with the use of carefully placed low voltage LED lights incorporated into paving and walls. With the combination of increasing demand for more efficient lighting, increasing availability of sustainable designs, light pollution considerations, and aesthetic and safety concerns, the methods and equipment of outdoor illumination have been evolving. The increasing use of LEDs, solar power, low voltage fixtures, energy efficient lamps, and energy-saving lighting design are examples of innovation in the field.

=== Residential gardens ===
A residential or private domestic garden such as the front garden or back garden is the most common form of garden. The front garden may be a formal and semi-public space and so subject to the constraints of convention and local laws. While typically found in the yard of the residence, a garden may also be established on a roof, in an atrium or courtyard, on a balcony, in windowboxes, or on a patio. Residential gardens are typically designed at human scale, as they are most often intended for private use. However, the garden of a great house or a large estate may be larger than a public park, and may contain specialized gardens (such as those for exhibiting one particular type of plant) and eyecatchers.

Some early residential gardens include the Donnell Garden in Sonoma, California. The garden was designed by landscape architect, Thomas Church, with Lawrence Halprin and architect, George T. Rockrise, which was completed in 1948. The garden is currently regarded as a modernist icon and has been applauded for its well maintained garden of its time. The garden was recognized for its unique and organic forms that represented a modern style of California. The garden is on top of a hillside overlooking the northern area of San Francisco Bay.

=== East Asian gardens ===
Japanese and Korean gardens, originally influenced by Chinese gardens, can be found at private homes, in neighbourhood or city parks, and at historical landmarks such as Buddhist temples. Some of the Japanese gardens most famous in the Western world and Japan are Japanese gardens in the karesansui tradition. The Ryōan-ji temple garden is a well-known example. There are Japanese gardens of various styles, with plantings often evoking wabi-sabi simplicity. In Japanese culture, garden-making is a high art, intimately linked to the arts of calligraphy and ink painting.

== See also ==
- Celebrity gardener
- Computer-aided garden design
- Flower garden
- History of gardening
- Index of gardening articles
- Landscape architecture
- Royal Horticultural Society
