= Garden designer =

Design profession

A garden designer is someone who designs the plan and features of gardens, either as an amateur or professional. The compositional elements of garden design and landscape design are: terrain, water, planting, constructed elements and buildings, paving, site characteristics and genius loci, and the local climatic qualities.

== Services ==
Garden designers are skilled specialists dealing with master planning of landscapes and design of gardens, consulting with advice for clients, providing direction and supervision during construction, and the management of establishment and maintenance once the garden has been created. They are able to survey the site, and prepare drawings for the development of a garden from concepts to construction, and source the plant and building materials. Historically, many gardens have been designed by talented amateurs without formal training, and many others have been designed by people whose artistic or design training was not originally focused on gardens. The complexities in contemporary environmental design issues and technology increase the scope professional garden designers fill.

== Methods ==
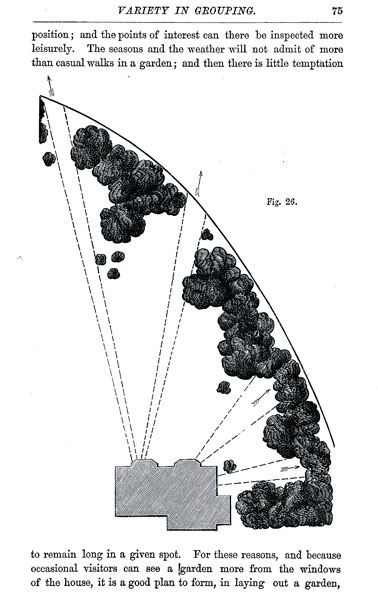
Illustration from a popular nineteenth century book on garden design: Edward Kemp's How to lay out a Garden. The drawing shows how to plant a group of trees framing views to the scenery beyond

A wide range of design methods have been used by garden designers, depending partly on the historical period in which they worked and partly on the professional discipline with which they have the closest relationship. One can, for example, speak of an "architect's garden", "artist's garden" or a "plantsman's garden". Treating the subject historically, one can say that ancient gardens were likely to have been "drawn" directly on the ground, that Renaissance gardens were drawn on paper and that modern gardens are drawn on a computer. The design process always has an influence on the design product.

There tends to be a distinction between those designers who start with the plant palette and its needs, called garden design; and those designers who begin with consideration of the space and place-making to create architectural spaces and circulation routes with plants and other elements, called landscape design. Many famous gardens which contain myriad interesting plants can be incompletely planned as a whole and lack integrated composition. Also, many gardens which are well planned in overall design can lack the interest from planting detail. Some keen gardeners who are very knowledgeable about plants can be resistant to conceptualizing design. Some very competent designers and landscape architects have a meager amount of diverse botanical and horticultural knowledge and experience. A competent and talented garden designer can synthesize both needs to design and create beautiful and sustainable landscapes and gardens.

== Garden design education ==
Historically, garden designers were trained under the apprentice system, such as André Le Nôtre with his father and Beatrix Farrand with Charles Sprague Sargent. Specialist university-level landscape planning and garden design courses were established in the twentieth century, generally attached to departments of agriculture, horticulture, or architecture. In the second half of the twentieth century many of these courses changed their scale of focus and their nomenclature, from garden design to landscape architecture. Towards the end of the twentieth century a number of BA garden design curricula were established with the emphasis more on design than horticulture. Horticultural colleges, in ornamental horticulture departments, and architecture colleges, in landscape architecture departments, continue to train contemporary garden designers.

== Notable garden designers ==
- André Le Nôtre
- Arit Anderson
- Isabel Bannerman
- Chris Beardshaw
- Beth Chatto
- Emma Clark
- Sarah Eberle
- Adam Frost
- Diarmuid Gavin
- Dominique Girard
- Penelope Hobhouse
- Gertrude Jekyll
- Geoffrey Jellicoe
- Lawrence Johnston
- William Martin
- Shunmyō Masuno
- Piet Oudolf
- Russell Page
- Dan Pearson
- Humphrey Repton
- James Russell
- Diego Suarez
- Hirofumi Suga
- Tom Stuart-Smith
- Joe Swift
- Roger Turner
- Christopher Tunnard
- Rosemary Verey
- Cleve West
- Andrew Wilson

== See also ==
- History of gardening
- Index of gardening articles

== Additional sources ==
- Sylvia Crowe, Garden Design Antique Collector's Club, 2003.
- Marie-Luise Gothein A history of garden art (English edition) 1928.
- Tom Turner, Garden history philosophy and design 2000 BC to 2000AD Spon Press, 2005.
- Roger Turner, Better Garden Design Batsford Press, 1986.
- R. Turner, Design in the Plant Collector's Garden Timber Press.
