= Computer-aided garden design =

Use of CAD packages in garden design

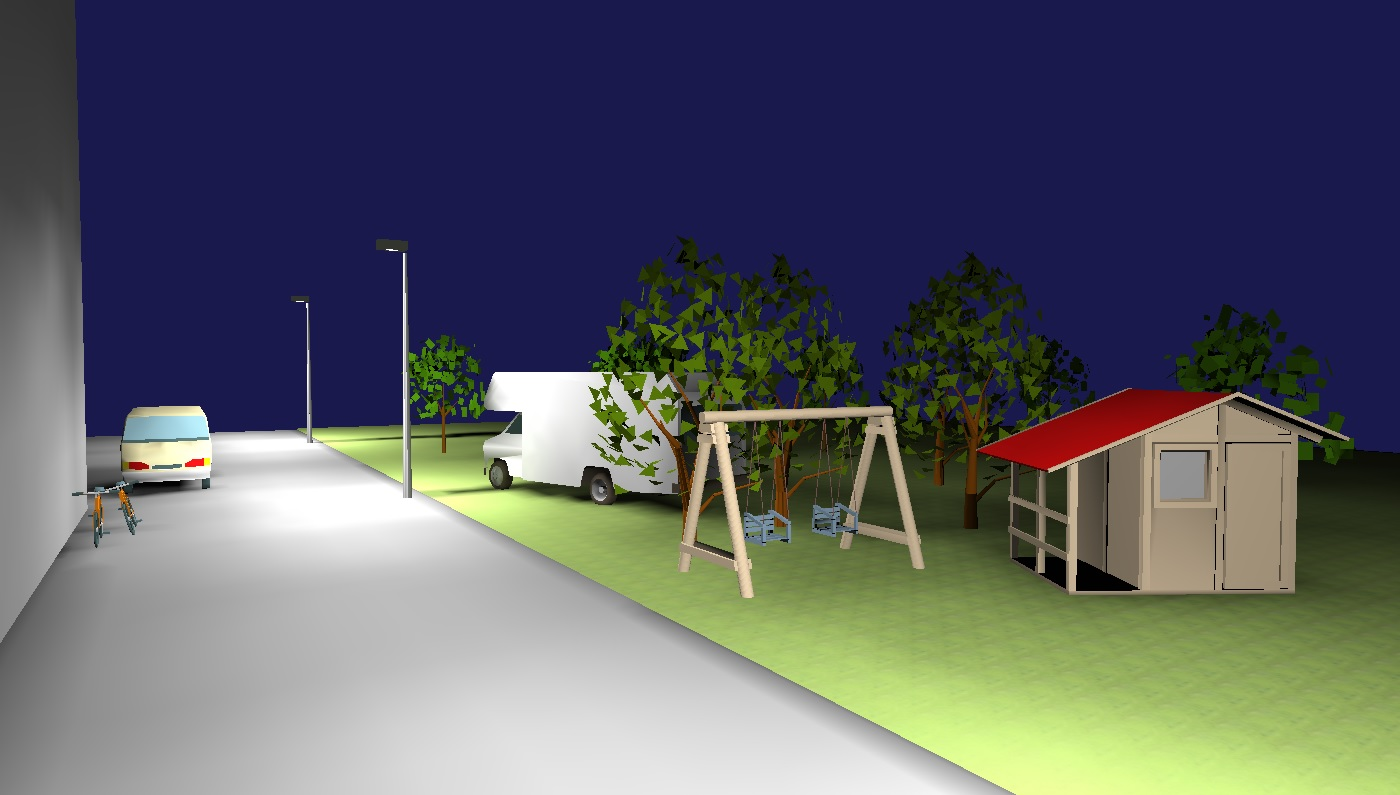

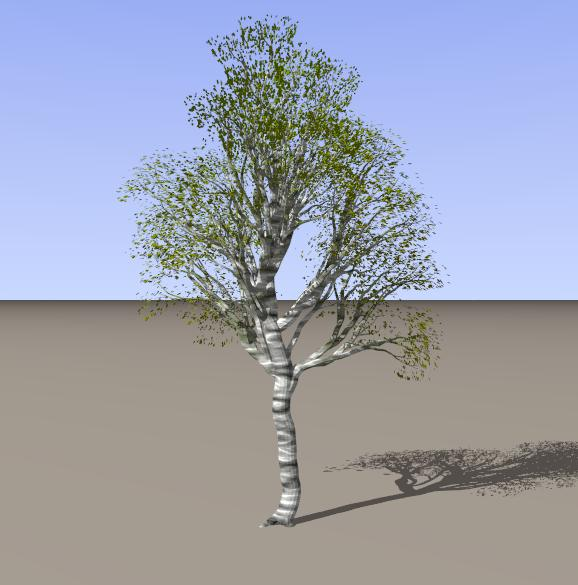

Computer-aided garden design describes the use of CAD packages to ease and improve the process of garden design. Professional garden designers have used CAD packages designed for other professions. This includes architectural design software for the drafting of garden plans, 3-D software and image-editing software for visual representation.

But tailor-made computer-aided design software is made for the amateur garden design market. It contains some of the functionality of the more advanced programs, packaged in an easy-to-use format. Although designers still use drawing by hand, in the 2020s AI has been used including by non-professionals. Apps are widely publicly available including for plant identification.

== See also ==
- Floor plan
- House plan
- Virtual home design software
