= Emma Clark =

Emma Clark or Clarke may refer to:

== People ==
- Emma Chichester Clark (born 1955), British children's book illustrator and author
- Emma Clarke (born 1971), writer and voice-over artist
- Emma Clarke (basketball) (born 2000), Australian basketball player
- Emma Clarke (footballer) (1876–?), British footballer
- Emma Clark (garden designer) (fl. 1990s–2000s), British designer of Islamic gardens

== Fictional characters ==
- Emma Clark, character in 7 Women
- Emma Clark, character in Hell's House
