= Hirofumi Suga =

Hirofumi Suga may refer to:

- Hirofumi Suga (comedian), Japanese comedian
- Hirofumi Suga (garden designer), Japanese garden designer and landscape architect
