= Roger Turner (garden designer) =

Roger Turner is a British garden designer and writer of gardening-related non-fiction books. He trained as an architect, and now practises as a garden designer in Gloucestershire. He lectures widely on garden subjects, and is the author of several gardening books.

Turner has given talks in the UK, Ireland and the US on a wide range of gardening subjects, specialising in perennials of all kinds, garden design and garden history. He trained as an architect and now works as a landscape designer. He is a knowledgeable plantsman, active in the Hardy Plant Society, and a founding member of the Gloucestershire group of the National Council for the Conservation of Plants and Gardens.

Turner's books include the monograph Euphorbias and previously Better Garden Design and Capability Brown. He contributes to a number of journals and magazines including Hortus and The English Garden. His garden design for the 1983 Chelsea Flower Show won the Sunday Times contest and then won an award, and he designed two gardens and pavilions at the Garden Festival in South Wales in 1992.

== Bibliography ==
- Capability Brown and the Eighteenth Century English Landscape, London: Weidenfeld & Nicolson; New York: Rizzoli, 1985. ISBN 0-8478-0643-X. 2nd ed. Chichester: Phillimore, 1999. ISBN 9781860771149
- Better Garden Design, London: Dent, 1986. ISBN 0-460-04703-5
- Euphorbias — A Gardeners' Guide, London: Batsford, 1995. ISBN 0-88192-330-3 Paperback ed. 1998. ISBN 0-88192-419-9
- Design in the Plant Collector's Garden, Portland, Oregon: Timber Press, 2005. ISBN 0-88192-690-6
