= Bloom Festival =

Ireland's largest gardening event

Coordinates: 53.3654°N 6.3318°W

Bord Bia Bloom
- Bloom
- Genre: Gardening, horticulture, food
- Locations: Phoenix Park, Dublin, Ireland
- Founded: 2007
- Attendance: 60,000–110,000
- Patron: President of Ireland
- Website: https://www.bordbiabloom.com/

Bloom Festival, officially known as Bord Bia Bloom, is Ireland's largest gardening show. It is a large five-day event, held each year in Phoenix Park, Dublin. It was first held in 2007 as Bloom in the Park, and is organised by An Bord Bia (The Food Board).

The 2020 event was cancelled owing to the measures taken to address the 2020 coronavirus pandemic.

== History ==
The first Bloom garden festival was held in June 2007 and opened by the President of Ireland, Mary McAleese.

The fourth (2010) festival was opened on 3 June 2010, with around 8,000 people visiting on the opening day. Chinese ambassador Liu Biwei and the Earl of Rosse were among notable attendees. Former Chelsea Flower Show judge Andrew Wilson also judged at the event. The 2010 event featured 24 gardens spread across 10 acres (4.0 ha) of Phoenix Park. The winner of Super Garden, an RTÉ competition, was among them.

Past events have featured professional gardeners, an artisan food market and culinary displays from several celebrity chefs. Since the event was launched, the show has had an increasing focus on food, with garden designers finding it hard to get sponsorship.

The event has attracted large numbers of visitors, increasing from 60,000 people in 2010, to nearly 120,000 people in 2019. The volume of visitors has led to long queues, and increased levels of traffic in the area. The event organisers have sought to encourage attendees to make use of public transport.

== Gallery ==
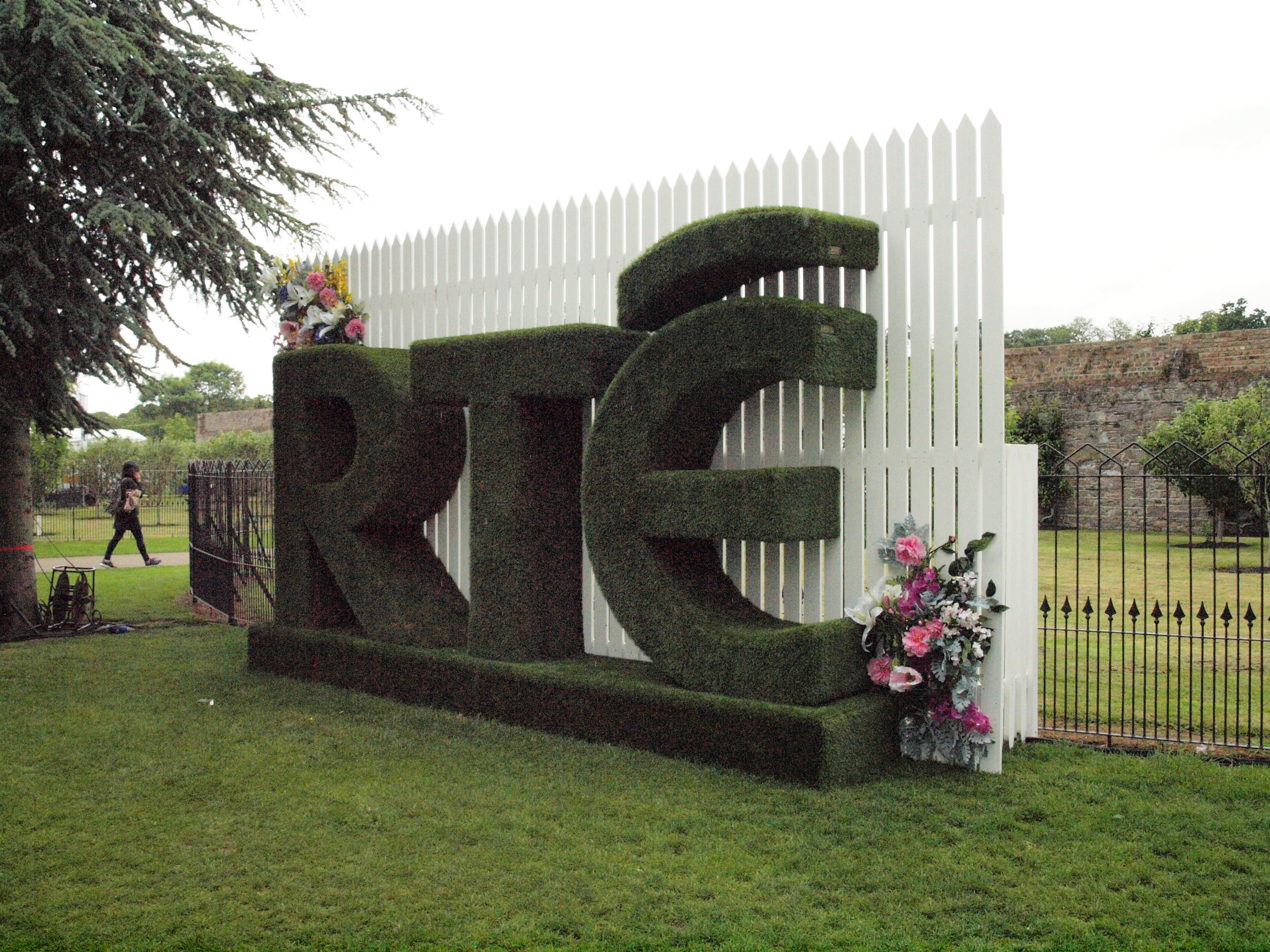
RTÉ logo at Bloom 2017

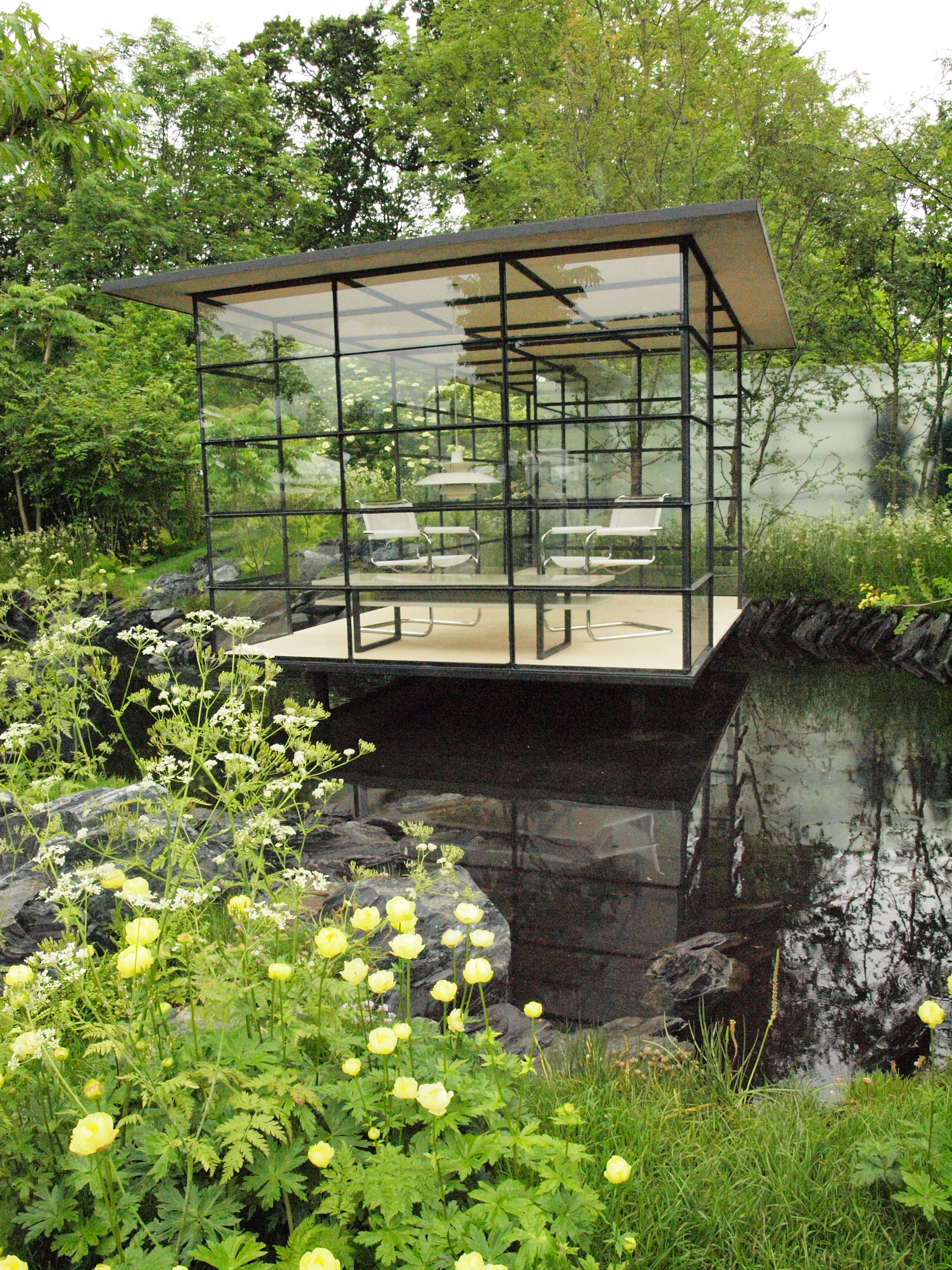
Show garden, 2017

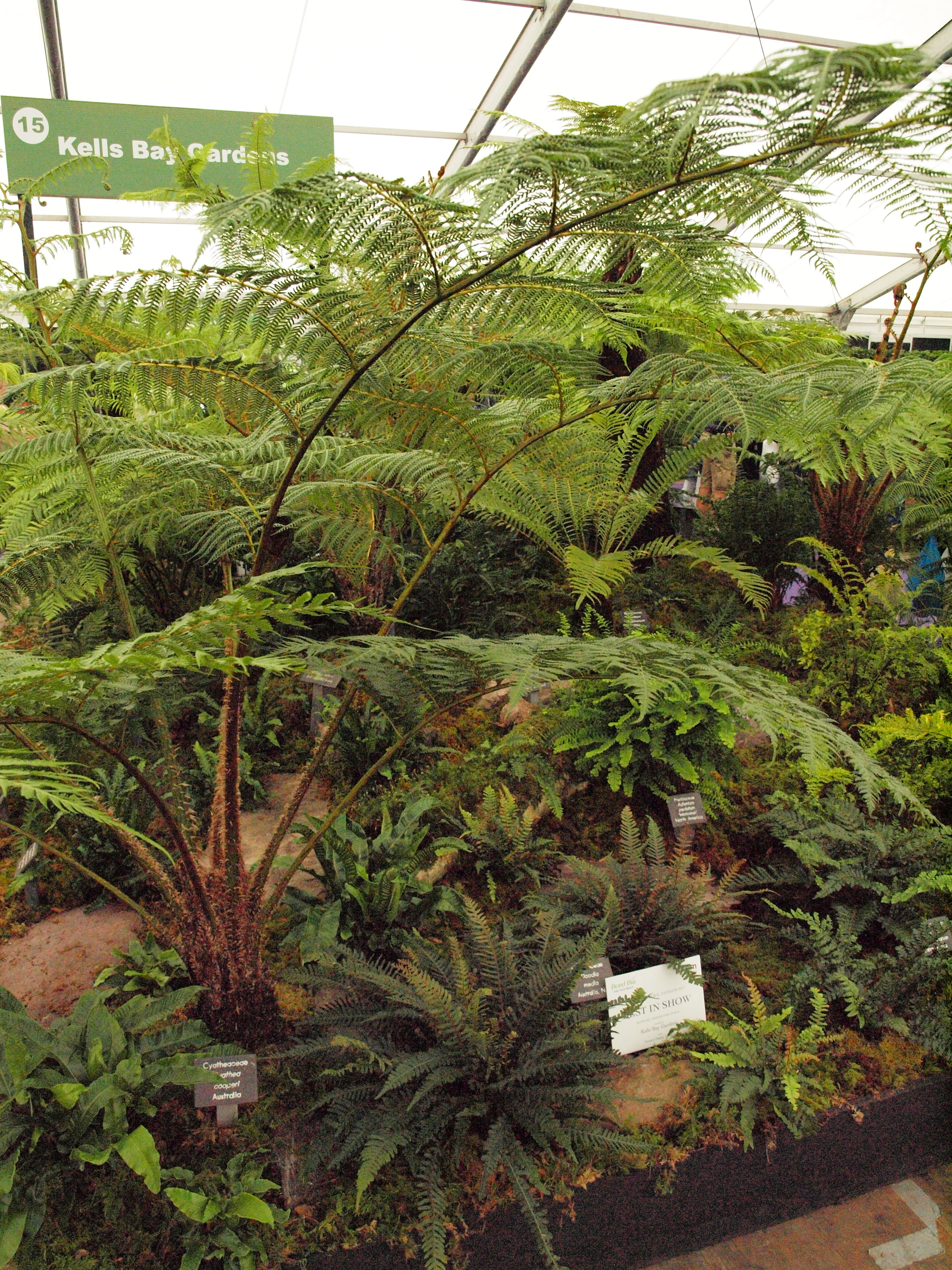
Plant exhibit, 2017

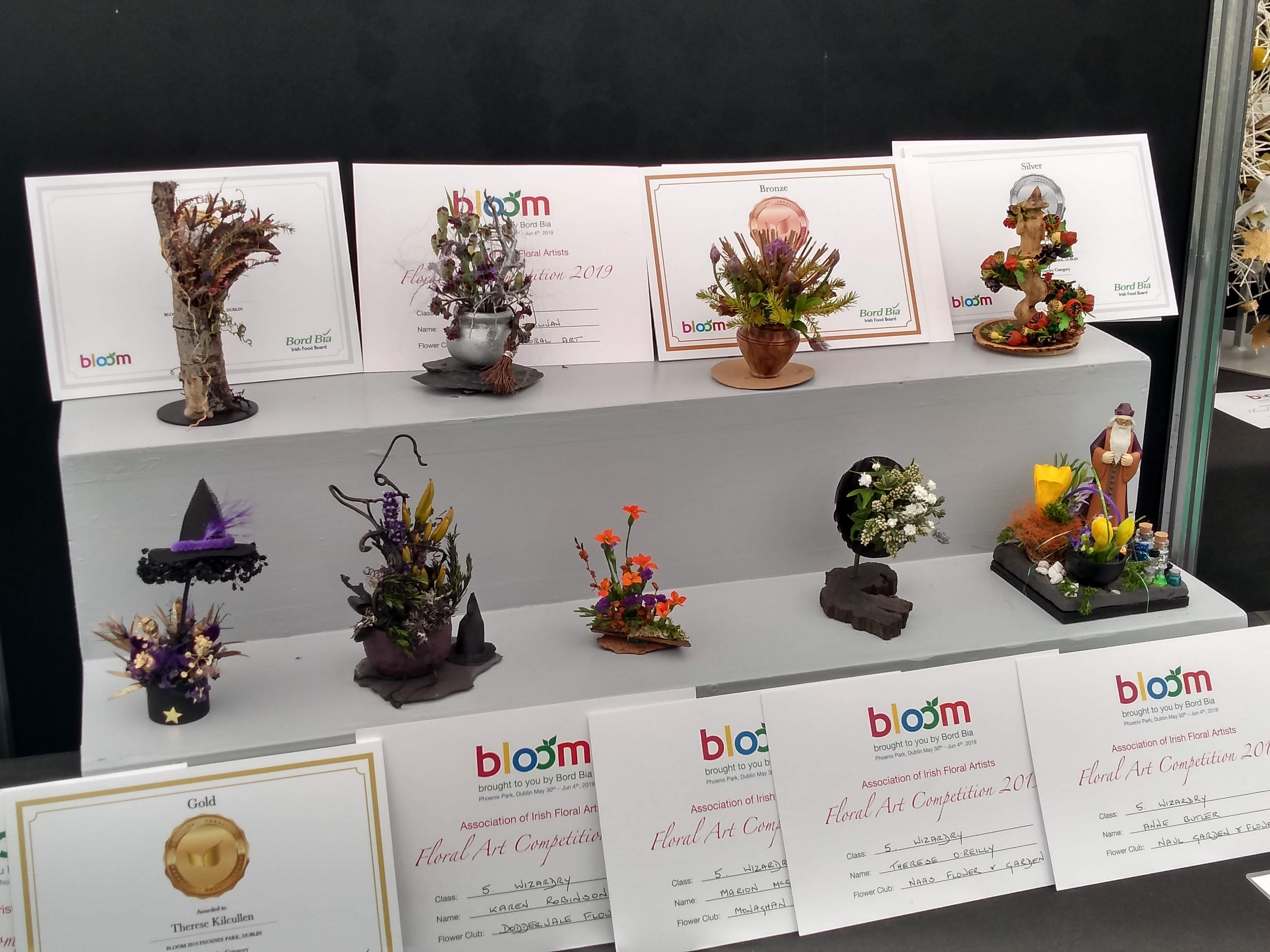
Floral exhibit, 2019

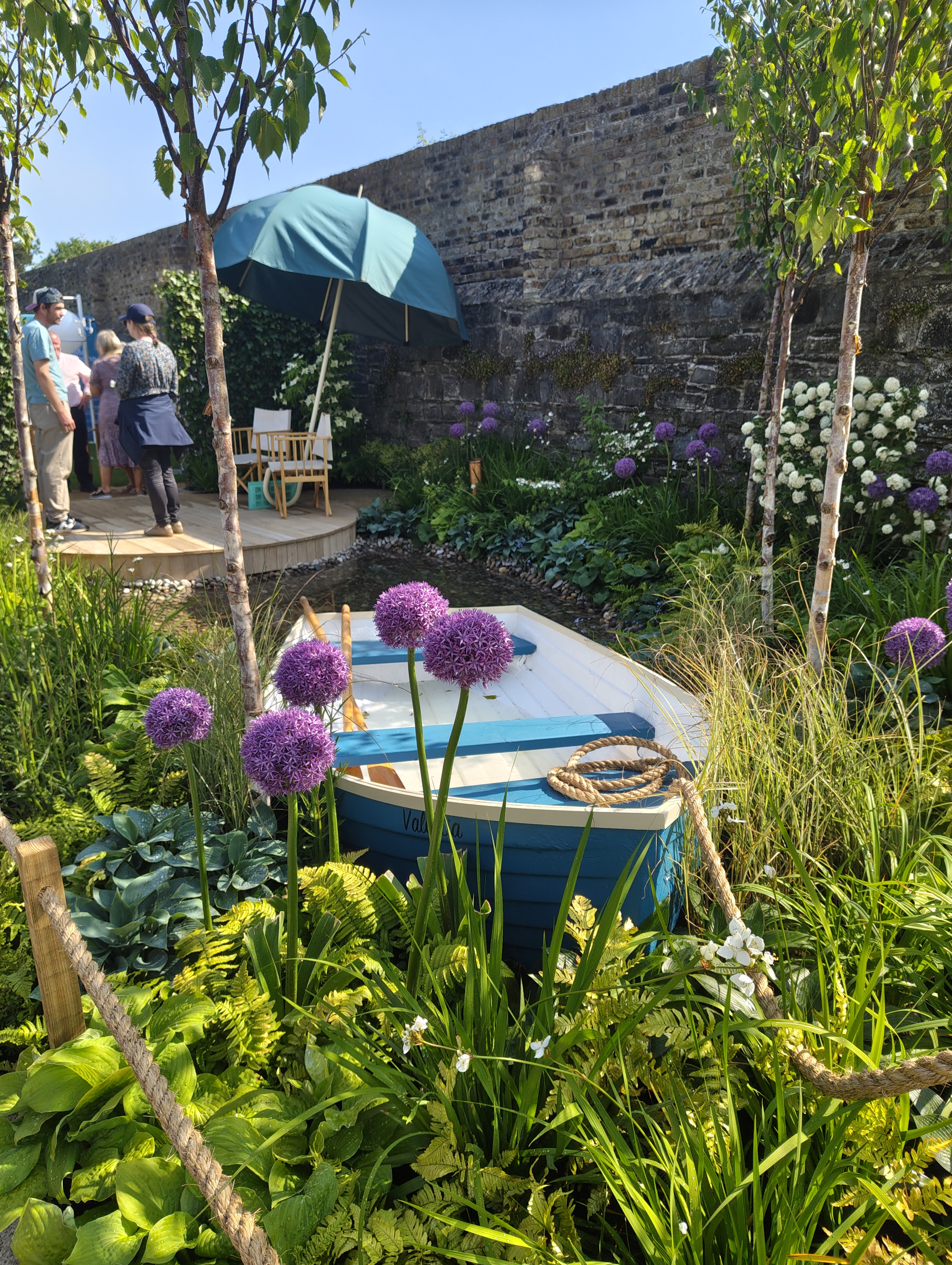
Show garden, 2026

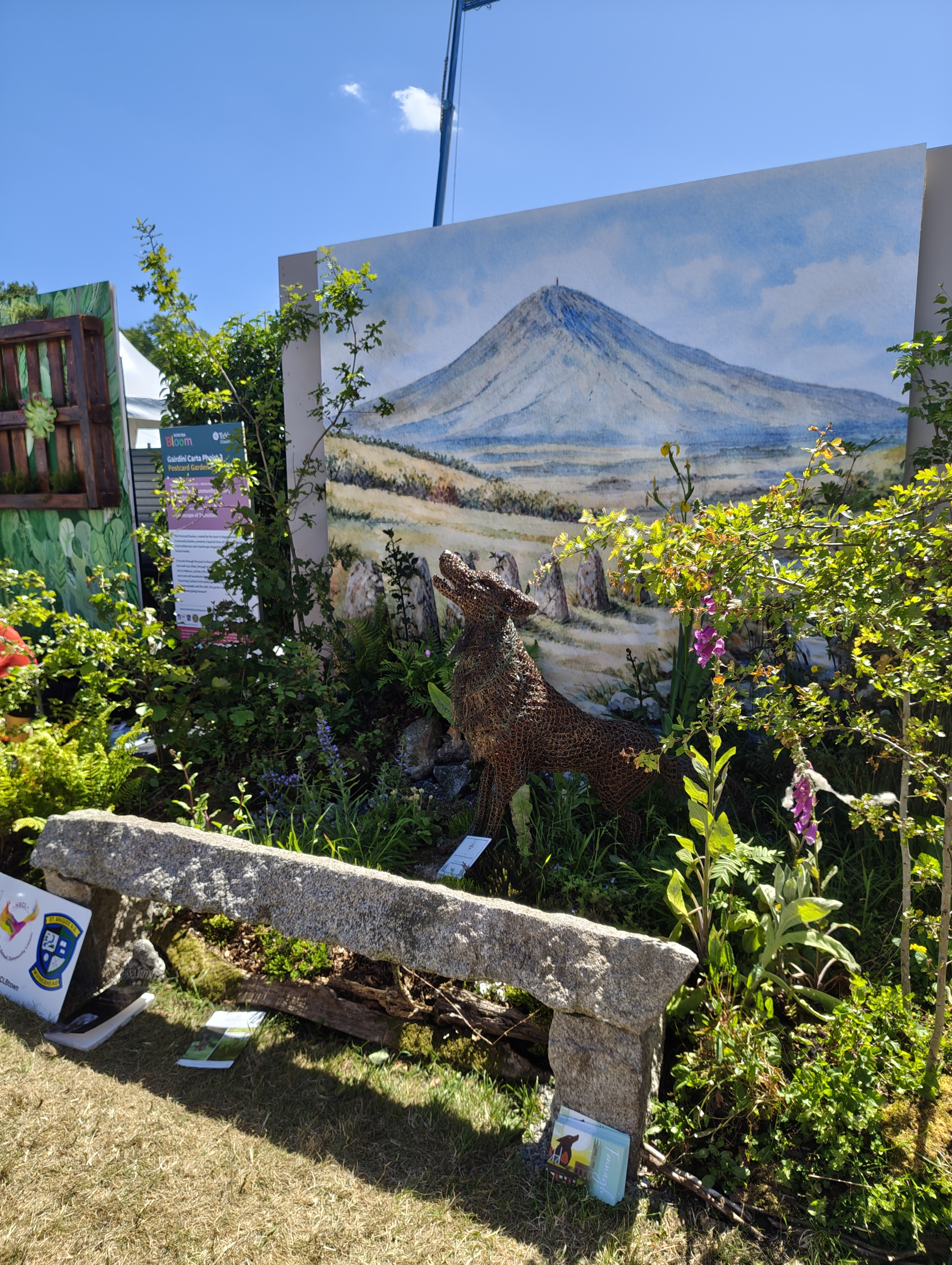
Postcard garden, 2026
