= Formal garden =

Garden with clear structure and geometric shapes

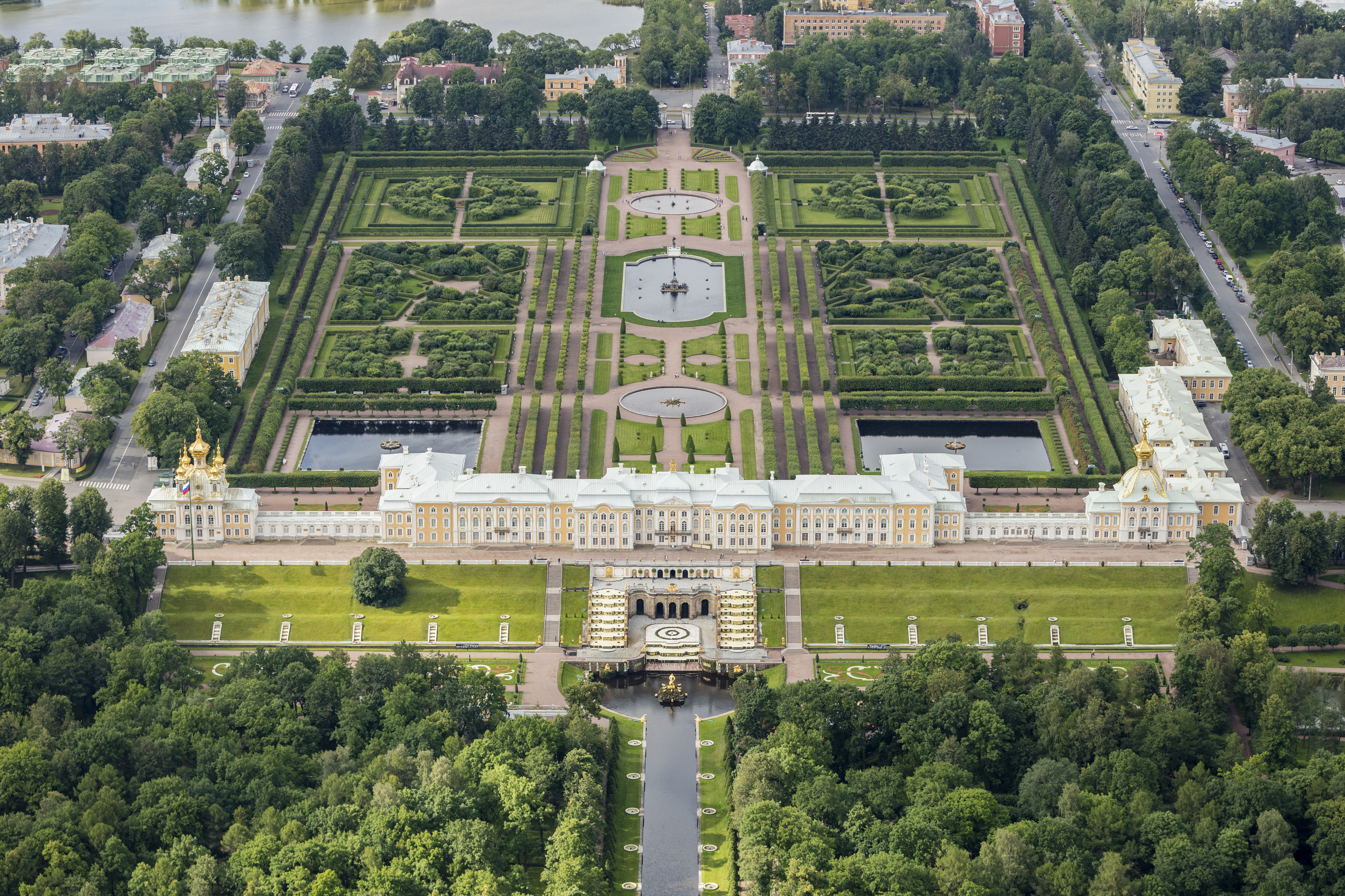
Aerial view of the formal garden at Peterhof Palace in Saint Petersburg, Russia

A formal garden is a garden with a clear structure, geometric shapes and in most cases a symmetrical layout. Its origin goes back to the gardens which are located in the desert areas of Western Asia and are protected by walls. The style of a formal garden is reflected in the Persian gardens of Iran, and the monastic gardens from the Late Middle Ages. It has found its continuation in the Italian Renaissance gardens and has culminated in the French formal gardens from the Baroque period. Through its design, the garden conveys a sense of established order and transparency to the observer.

In garden design, the formal garden is said to be the opposite to the landscape garden, which follows nature and which came into fashion in the 18th century.

== Distinguishing features ==
A typical feature of formal gardens is the axial and symmetrical arrangement of pathways and beds. Both of these elements are typically enclosed, for example with low box hedges or flower borders. The garden itself is usually surrounded by "green walls", for instance walls covered in climbing plants, fences or clipped hedges. The area that has been created by this procedure is again divided by hedges, espaliers, and trellises. The enclosed areas of the different parts are structured by means of low elements. This creates an atmosphere of clarity and straightness and thus also a certain degree of simplicity. The center of the garden is often accentuated by a round, oval or square structural element, which is usually made of dimension stone.

The footpaths are covered with materials like brick, bluestone or paving stone. Alternatively, the paths can be covered with scattered gravel or colored glass chippings. Their straight lines create visual axes. At the end of these axes, eye-catching elements, such as sculptures, ornamental ponds, fountains, planters or seating accommodation can be found.

Other eyecatchers that can be found in formal gardens are ornamental structural elements such as beds that are arranged to form intertwined patterns, or beds with complex geometrical arrangements of the plants. However, formal gardens that contain these elements lose their simplistic design in part and are no longer easy to care for. Most of the plants in a formal garden need pruning once a year. This is mostly necessary for topiary, which is a practice where evergreen woody plants, for example box trees, yew trees, hollies or pine trees are cut into geometric shapes, such as spheres, pyramids, or cones, but also into animal shapes or other more fanciful shapes. In larger formal gardens, usually there are hedge mazes, which are constructed by means of topiary. These mazes include archways, hidden resting places and cul-de-sacs.

Usually, low perennial plants and flowers harmonize well are planted in herbaceous borders. However, the main criterion is not the bloom but rather the shape and effect produced by the color of the leaves. Therefore, ornamental foliage plants are often selected for the beds. The type of lawn that can be found in a formal garden, if used, is usually closely cut ornamental lawn.

Examples

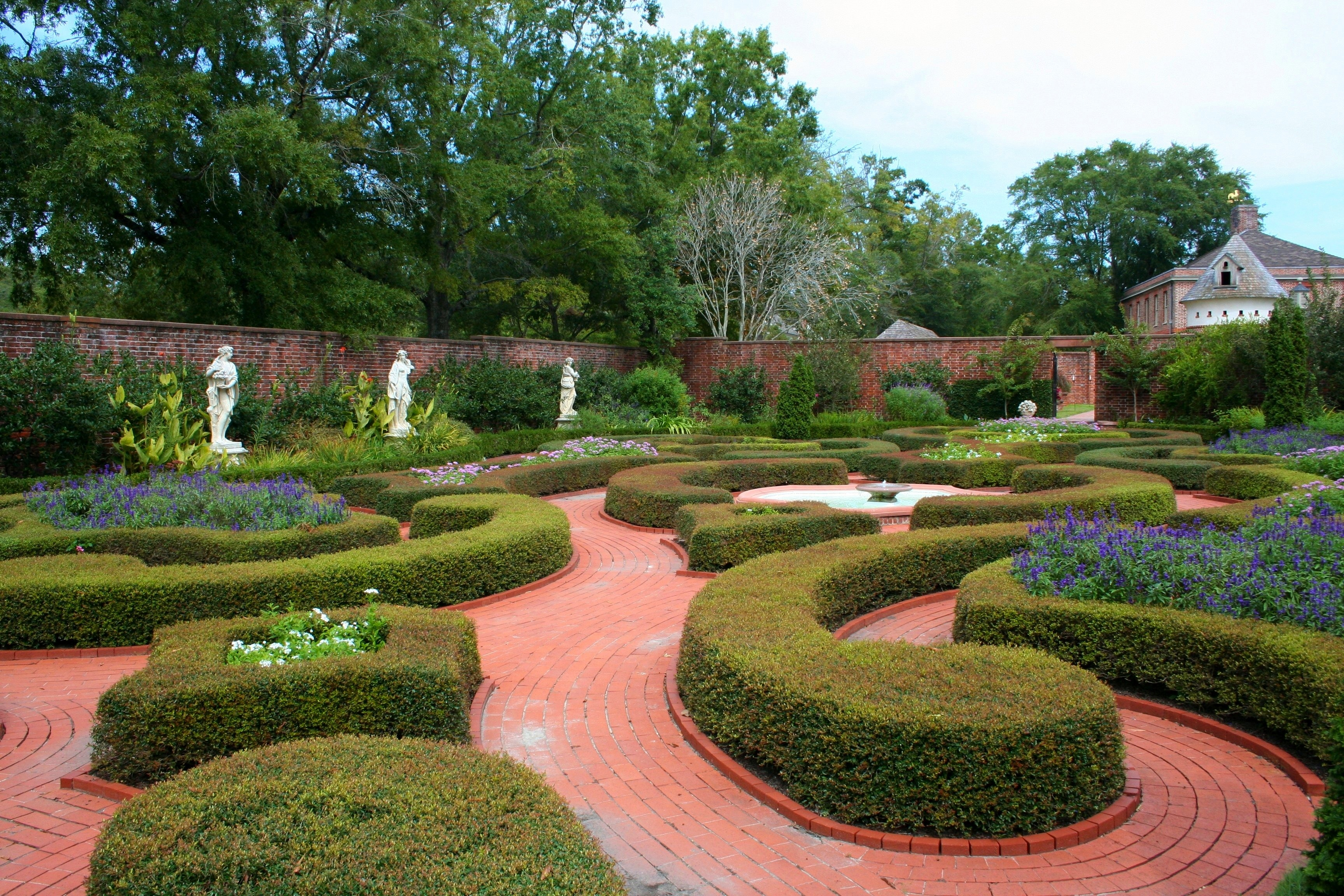
Typical formal garden

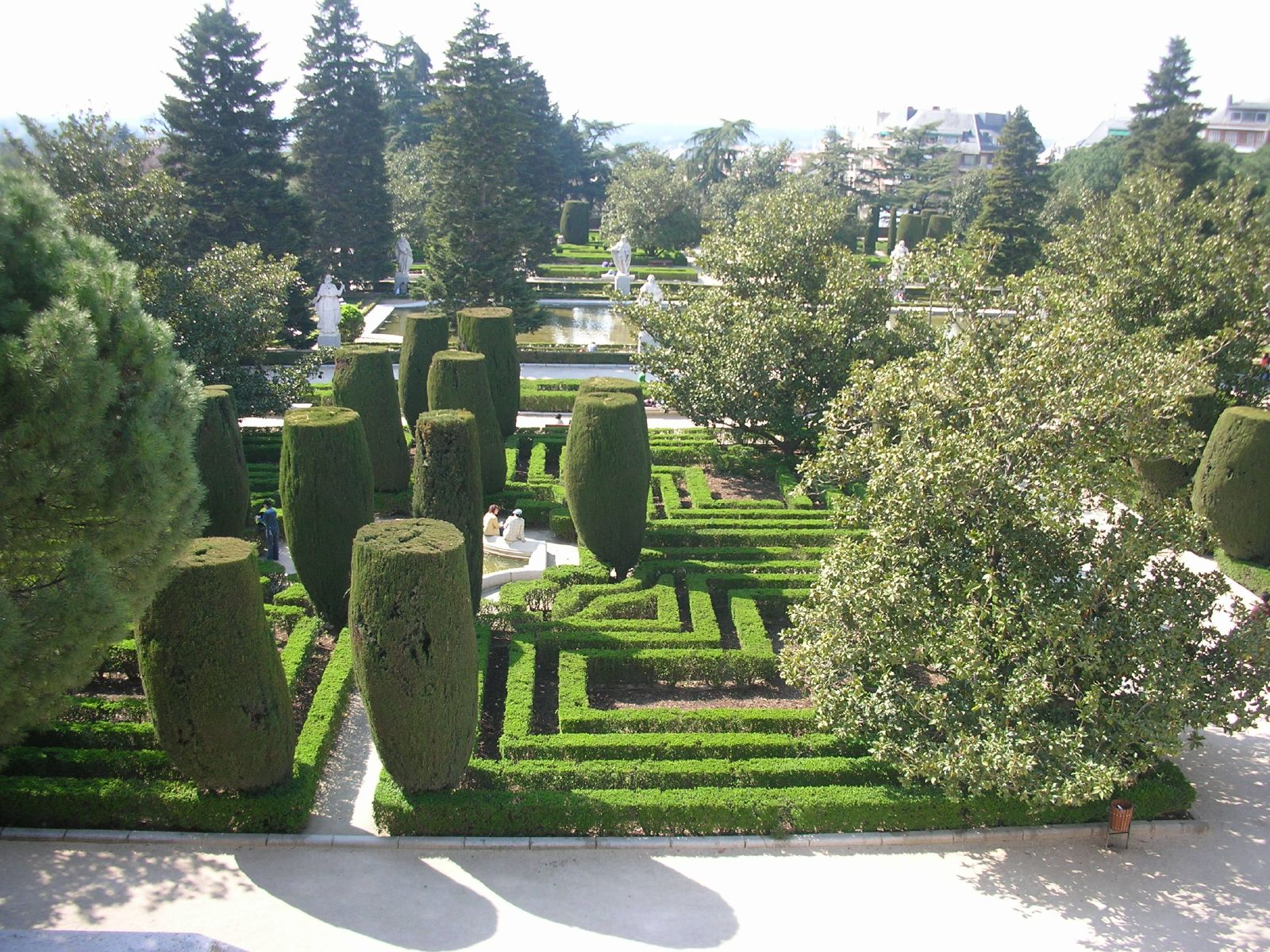
Sabatini Gardens at the Palacio Real in Madrid

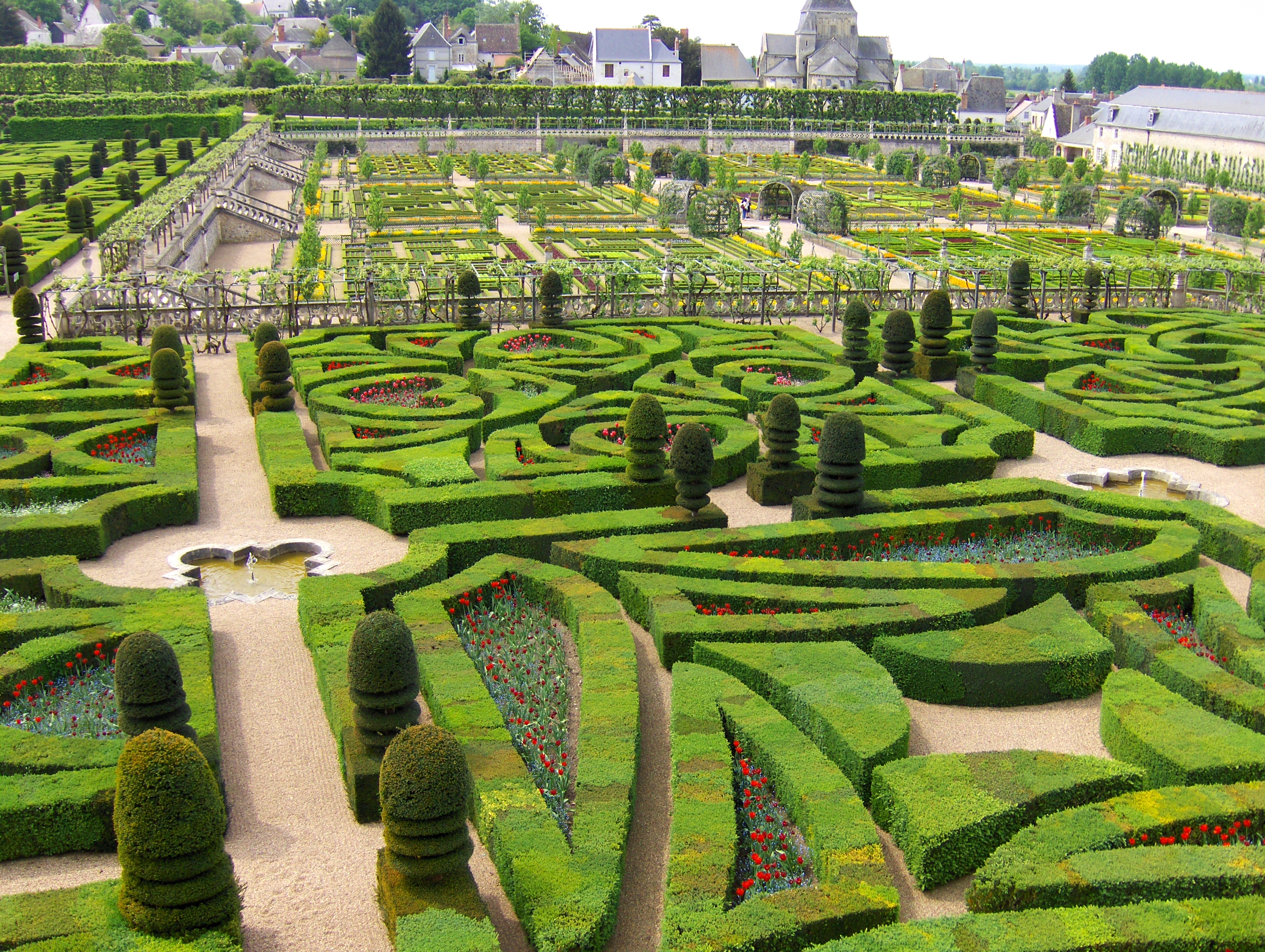
Formal gardens in Château de Villandry

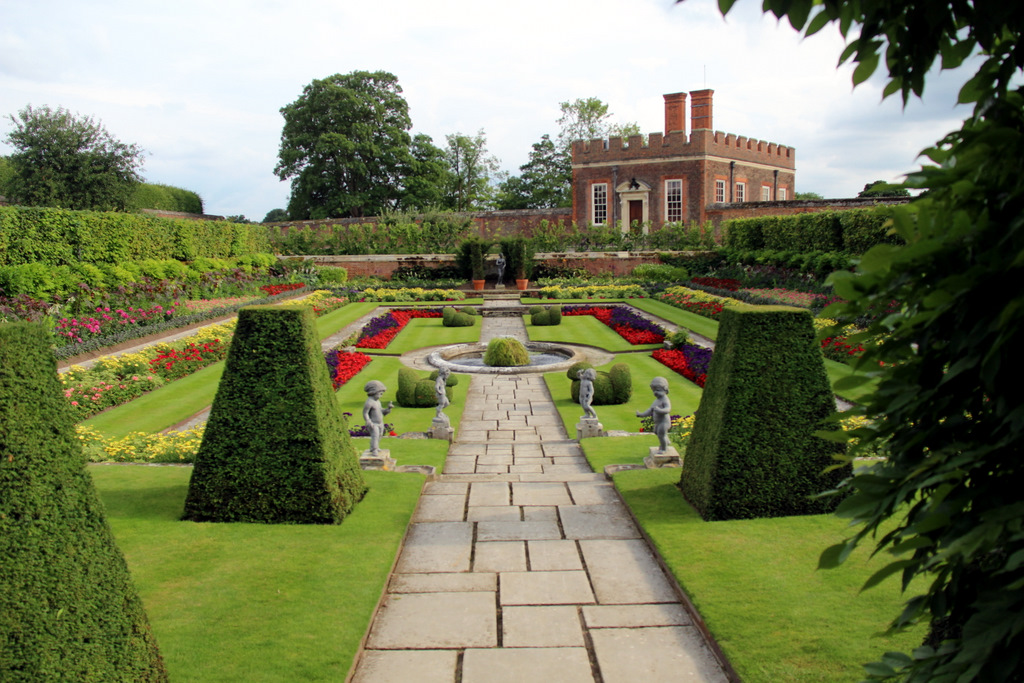
Formal garden in Hampton Court Palace

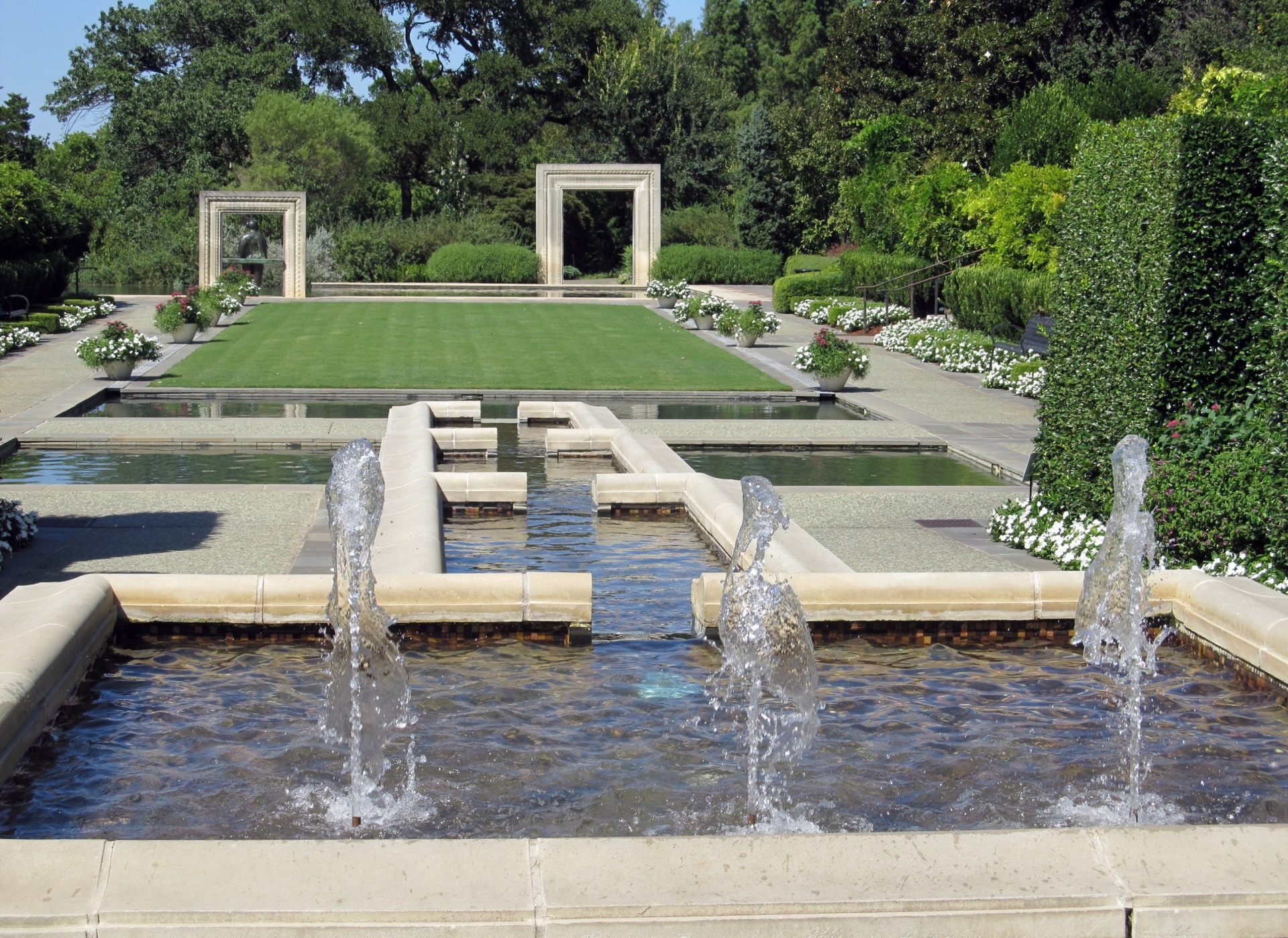
Modern formal garden

== See also ==
- Baroque garden
- Giardino all'italiana
- Paradise garden
- List of garden types

== Bibliography ==
- Mark Laird, Hugh Palmer: The Formal Garden. Traditions of Art and Nature. Thames and Hudson, London 1992, ISBN 0-500-01542-2.
- Günter Mader, Laila Neubert-Mader: The English Formal Garden. Five Centuries of Design. Aurum, London 1997, ISBN 1-85410-473-X.
- Allen S. Weiss: Mirrors of Infinity. The French Formal Garden and 17th-Century Metaphysics. Princeton Architectural Press, New York 1995, ISBN 1-56898-050-7.
- Reginald Blomfield: The Formal Garden in England (Classic Reprint). Forgotten Books, London 2015, ISBN 1331417139
