= Sarah Eberle =

English garden designer

Sarah Eberle MBE is an English chartered landscape architect, garden designer and fellow of the Landscape Institute and the Society of Garden Designers. She is noted for winning many Royal Horticultural Society (RHS) gold medals and has been named one of the three most influential figures in the landscape industry.

== Life and work ==
Eberle grew up in Dartmoor, Devon. Her father, Sir James Eberle (1927–2018), was a British admiral. She attended Thames Polytechnic, and qualified as a landscape architect in 1980.

Eberle has won more gold medals at the RHS Chelsea Flower Show than any other exhibitor; and a gold medal in every category there is in the show. Her Chelsea garden won 'Best in Show' in 2007 and 2017. She has won six Hampton Court Gold medals and in 2022 she was made an RHS Iconic Horticultural Hero.

Eberle is a fellow of the Landscape Institute, and of the Society of Garden Designers and the Institute of Horticulture; she has an Honorary Doctorate in Design from Greenwich University. She is an RHS Associate of Honour (2016) and was a member of the RHS council (2018–2023). She was also named the British Association of Landscape Industries Grand Award winner in 2007 and the Society of Gardeners Community Space award winner in 2014.

In 2026, Eberle received a gold medal and the Garden of the Year award for her show garden 'On the Edge' which was designed to launch CPRE's campaign to highlight the overlooked countryside at the edge of our towns and cities.

Eberle lives near Cole Henley, Whitchurch in Hampshire, with her husband, Robert Stevens, and three children.

== Show gardens ==
designs include:

- Toy Garden (1998)
- For Whoever you are.... (2001)
- Estuary Garden (2002)
- Woodland Garden (2003)
- A Woman's Sanctuary (2004)
- Walking Barefoot (2006)
- 600 Days (2007)
- Breast Cancer Haven Garden (2015)
- Beyond Our Borders ((2015)
- Garden of Inspiration (2017)
- Changing Moves Changing Minds (2018)
- The Resilience Garden (2019)
- Psalm 23 (2021)
- Building the Future (2022)
- Campaign to Protect Rural England (2026)
