= Andrew Wilson (garden designer) =

Andrew Wilson is a British landscape architect, garden designer, lecturer and writer. He was a partner in Wilson McWilliam Studio and founded The London College of Garden Design.

== Biography ==
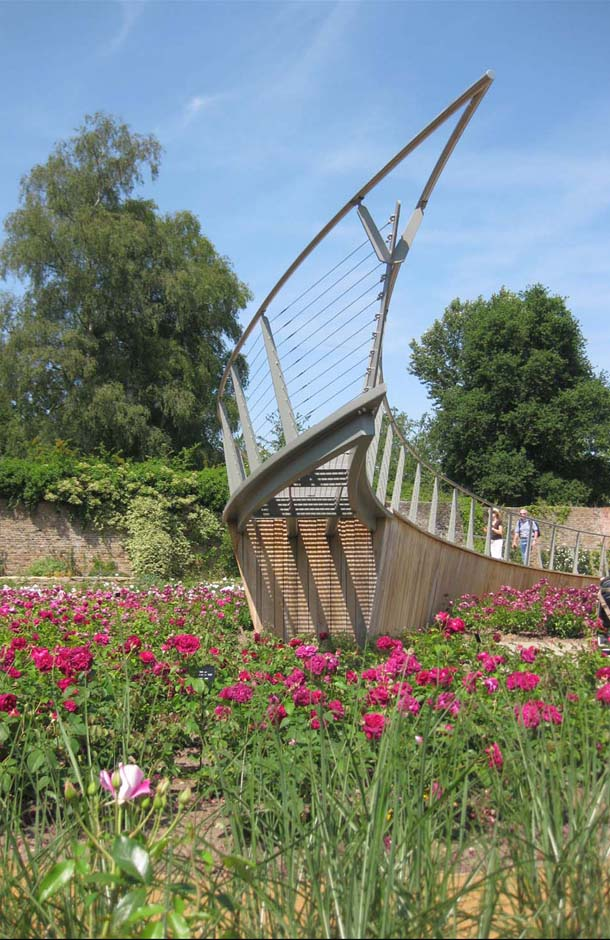
View of the elevated walkway at the new rose garden in the Savill Garden by Wilson McWilliam Studio

Andrew Wilson has served as a judge for the Royal Horticultural Society at the Chelsea Flower Show, Hampton court and Tatton Park. His judging experience also includes the Bloom Festival in Ireland. He is also the founding editor of The Garden Design Journal and is a former chairman and currently a Fellow of the Society of Garden Designers, the UK's professional body for garden design.

== Publications and editorial work ==
He wrote a regular column for Gardens Illustrated and contributes to the Royal Horticultural Society's journal The Garden alongside the production of a series of books, the most recent of which are Influential Gardeners, The Book of Garden Plans and the Book of Plans for Small Gardens, The Gardens of Luciano Guibbilei and Contemporary Colour in the Garden.

== Selected projects ==
- Savill Garden, Windsor Great Park 2008 New Rose Garden with Gavin McWilliam for Wilson McWilliam Studio
