= Cleve West =

Cleve West is an English garden designer who is based in Hampton Wick, Richmond upon Thames. He began designing in 1990 and has won six RHS gold medals at the Chelsea Flower Show. He won "Best in Show" and gold medal at both the 2011 and the 2012 Chelsea Flower Shows. He is one part of Three Men Went to Mow (along with fellow garden designers Joe Swift and James Alexander-Sinclair) who have made thirty YouTube films on gardening subjects.

In 2021 he was listed by House & Garden as one of the top 50 garden designers in the UK.

In 2023 West designed a garden for Chelsea for Centrepoint. The plants were dominated by a large derelict building – based on his step-daughter's Victoria town house in London. West explained: "The house has been destroyed and nature is slowly taking it over, with all the typical weeds you'd see on a site that's been abandoned for several years. It's nature's way of healing and a good to have an excuse to get weeds into a show garden, when they're generally banned!" The garden was described as "A very visceral metaphor for young people facing homelessness".
