= William Martin (garden designer) =

Australian garden designer

William Martin in his garden Wigandia in 2014, photographed by James Golden

William Martin (Born Rutherglen Scotland 25 June 1953) is known as an Australian garden designer. His garden Wigandia in south west Victoria at Noorat was twice voted Australia's best garden.

== Approach ==
Martin has been an outspoken advocate for a new approach to gardening in Australia. Climatic suitability was taken for granted as a necessary prerequisite for inclusion. For Australian magazine Your Garden, Martin wrote: "Choose the right plant types for your given growing conditions and area and the rest will fall into place". Elsewhere, Martin has been described as "independent of mind, individual in style". He has argued that most Australian gardening is still in a "Northern Hemisphere style" and therefore does not truly reflect Australian identity. However, this does not by any means suggest a focus on endemic Australian plants.

== Influences ==
Martin's references to influential gardens include the one created by Derek Jarman at Dungeness and Ian Hamilton Finlay's Little Sparta. In a blog entry Martin has himself cited an early Australian painting by John Glover as 'lurking in his sub-conscious' as a primary source.

== Wigandia ==
Martin began work on Wigandia, named after the Wigandia caracasana, in 1989. Early written work on Wigandia frequently highlight his objection to the "pampered woody European legacy" that has informed the Australian garden in the past. However, with the establishment of Wigandia as a working model of what can be achieved with minimal irrigation, Martin's attention displayed signs of shifting focus to the development of an understanding of his garden as art. Media attention 'focused' on the 'dry' aspect of this garden, considering the prolonged drought of Eastern Australia at the time.

The four hectare property that encompassed Wigandia, has been said to have begun life as 'nothing but a horse paddock, heavily grazed and aching with weeds'. Martin has variously described his garden as 'a series of sketches, but (also) a single canvas' and elsewhere, 'a single canvas with every area interlinked'. He has also attested to his interest in geographic references by stating that a primary concern was to 'ensure the garden harmonises with the surrounding landscape of Mount Noorat'. It could be argued this forms a key foundation in the colour selection at Wigandia where the paths and interspaces feature crushed red volcanic scoria sourced from southwest Victoria. In a gesture to cultural references, the frequent use of corrugated iron, a key feature of construction in rural Australia, is used in the garden as a barrier material for fencing and other installations.

Martin has been described as an artist who "explores the complex relationships between landscape, environment, culture and society."

=== Interpretations ===
After a visit in 2014 the noted American designer James Golden observed the place of Martin's work in the international lexicon of garden art when he wrote: "Few gardens I’ve ever visited so completely reflect the spirit of their place–and this place is extraordinary." In a major tribute to Martin's influence on garden design the noted Australian gardening writer Michael McCoy has stated, "Once you’ve seen Wigandia – as many did when it was all over the garden media a decade or so ago – you never quite garden the same again."

=== Current status ===
By 2020 the garden is thought to have been abandoned.
