= Emma Clark (garden designer) =

British author and garden designer

- Known for: Islamic garden designer
- Notable work: "Carpet Garden" at Highgrove House, garden at Cambridge Central Mosque

Emma Clark is a British garden designer, historian, and author. She specialises in designing Islamic gardens.

== Life ==
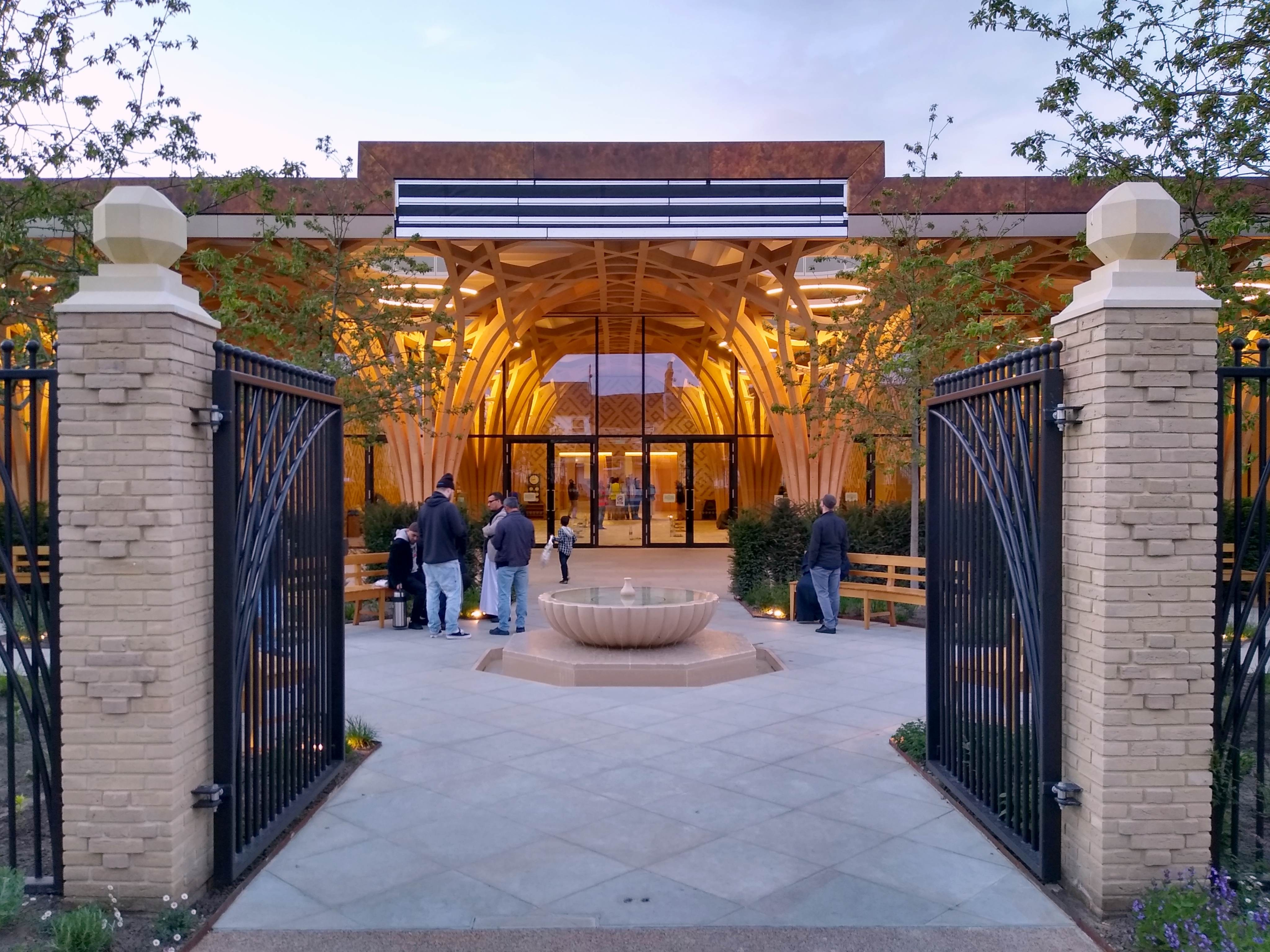
Gate and garden of Cambridge Central Mosque

Clark is the great-granddaughter of the former British prime minister, H. H. Asquith. She developed an interest in Islamic gardens while studying under Keith Critchlow at the Royal College of Art in London. She is a convert to Islam.

Clark designed the "Carpet Garden," inspired by two Turkish carpets at Highgrove House, with Charles, Prince of Wales, and Mike Miller for the Highgrove gardens.

She was approached by Muslim scholar Timothy Winter to design the Islamic gardens at the Cambridge Central Mosque, Europe's first eco-friendly mosque. The garden was inspired by the Quranic depiction of heaven.

Clark is also an instructor at The Prince's School of Traditional Arts.

== Publications ==
- The Art of the Islamic Garden (Crowood Press, 2004)
- Mehmet the Conqueror with illustrations by Laura de la Mare (Hood Hood Books, 1997)
- Underneath Which Rivers Flow: the Symbolism of the Islamic Garden (Prince of Wales's Institute of Architecture, 1996)
- Sinan: Architect of Istanbul with illustrations by Emma Alcock (Hood Hood Books, 1996)
