= Hirofumi Suga (garden designer) =

Japanese garden designer

- Native name: 菅 宏文
- Born: May 31, 1972 (age 52); Tokyo
- Occupation: Japanese Garden Designer, Landscape Architect

Hirofumi Suga (菅 宏文 Suga Hirofumi; born 31 May 1972) is a Japanese garden designer (called 庭師 “niwashi” in Japanese) and landscape architect, and is currently the CEO of 1moku Landscape Design and Research and 1moku Spain S.L. Some of his notable works include the rooftop garden design for Shanghai Grand Cinema, the Japanese Garden of Hotel Chinzanso Tokyo, and the garden of Taiko-en.

== Biography ==
=== Early life ===
Hirofumi Suga was born on May 31, 1972, in Shakujii-koen, Tokyo.

In an interview for "Green is..." magazine, Suga describes how when he was 18-years-old, his friend took him to visit gardens in Kyoto. He was so inspired by the temple gardens he saw there that he decided to pursue a career as a “niwashi”, or Japanese-style gardener. During that time, he met the acclaimed “niwashi” Kasai Tsutomu, who Suga greatly admired for his challenge to traditional methods in Japanese gardening. Suga would occasionally assist Kasai with his projects in order to learn from him.

=== Business/Career ===
He first started working as a gardener for the Tokyo landscape firm Shinwa at the age of 17. After three years of working for the Tokyo firm, he went to work for another gardening firm in Kyoto called Murakami.

In 1994, at 22-years-old, he started his own landscape design and construction firm called Ichimoku-Isseki, which later became known as 1Moku (pronounced “ichimoku”), currently located in Osaka, Japan. In the earlier years of his company, Suga mainly focused on private projects of garden and landscape designs. However, his lack of knowledge in construction and building requirements limited the extent of his craft, so he began studying in order to earn a degree in architecture. This allowed him to expand into larger areas of commercial landscaping and interior design that took into consideration the more fundamental uses and infrastructural limits of a space.

Since its establishment, 1Moku has completed over 80 design and gardening projects of various scales all across Japan, including a number of international collaborations. In 2018, he established a second landscape design company called Tsubaki Studio in Barcelona, Spain.

== Philosophical views ==
Traditionally, the role of a “niwashi” in Japanese culture was considered an important and esteemed position within society. More than simply tending to or creating a garden, a “niwashi” would incorporate a number of symbolic and spiritual components into their designs, including aspects of harmony, balance, use of nature, etc. As such, it is typical for even modern-day “niwashi” to develop their own personal philosophies of design.

In this respect, Suga's personal philosophies are reminiscent of this traditional role and approach of the “niwashi”. He strives to design with a holistic mindset, considering the entirety of the space so that both the garden aspect and the architecture aspect work harmoniously. He often sources traditional Japanese gardeners, like Jihei Ogawa, for his inspiration in creating “master plan gardens”, which is the idea that the gardeners not only design the outside or leftover space, but analyze the land and space as a whole to enhance the value of the architecture.

Suga also includes concepts of harmony with nature and surrounding fauna, combinations of traditional and modern methods, and the use of zen-style rock gardens in many of his projects in order to accomplish contemporary yet functional spaces for commercial or public use.

== Notable works and completed projects ==
- “Garden Visualizing Fashion Models as a Landscape” for XAVEL (2007)
- Roofgarden design for Shangai Grand Cinema (2009)
- Japanese Garden of Hotel Chinzanso Tokyo (2017)
- 2nd period Garden design and construction of Ouen, Taikoen (2017)
- Jo-Terrace Osaka (2017)

== Published works ==
- Japanese Garden (2015). Images Publishing Group Pty Ltd. ISBN 9781864706482

== See also ==
- Japanese Garden
- Landscape architect
- Ogawa Jihei VII
