= List of Canadian children's books =

This is a list of Canadian children's books.

== Canadian children's books ==
=== A ===
- Adeline's Dream (2005), a novel by Linda Aksomitis
- Adventures of Cow (2005–06), a picture book series by Lori Korchek
- The Adventures of Sajo and her Beaver People (1935), a novel by Grey Owl
- After the War (1996), a novel by Carol Matas
- African Adventure (1963), a novel by Canadian-born American author Willard Price
- Airborn (2004), a novel by Kenneth Oppel
- Alligator Pie (1974), poetry book by Dennis Lee
- Alphabeasts (2002), a picture book by Wallace Edwards
- Amazon Adventure (1949), a novel by Willard Price
- Amelia and Me (2013), a novel by Heather Stem
- Amos Daragon (2009), a series of fantasy fiction books by Bryan Perro
- Ancient Thunder (2006), a fantasy picture book by artist and writer Leo Yerxa
- And Then It Happened (2003), a series by Michael Wade and Laura Wade
- Anne of Avonlea (1909), a novel by Lucy Maud Montgomery
- Anne of Green Gables (1908), a novel by Lucy Maud Montgomery
- Anne of Ingleside (1939), a novel by Lucy Maud Montgomery
- Anne of the Island (1915), a novel by Lucy Maud Montgomery
- Anne of Windy Poplars (1936), a novel by Lucy Maud Montgomery
- Anne's House of Dreams (1917), a novel by Lucy Maud Montgomery
- Arctic Adventure (1980), a book by Willard Price
- Awake and Dreaming (1996), a novel by author Kit Pearson and illustrator Margot Zemach

=== B ===
- Before Green Gables (2008), a prequel to the Anne Shirley series by Budge Wilson
- Bella's Tree (2009), a book written by Janet Russell, with illustrations by Jirina Marton
- The Blythes Are Quoted (2009), a book completed by L.M. Montgomery (1874–1942) near the end of her life but not published in its entirety until 2009
- The Boy & the Bindi (2016), a picture book by Vivek Shraya and illustrated by Rajni Perera
- The Boy from the Sun (2006), a book by author Duncan Weller
- The Boy Sherlock Holmes (2007–12), a series of novels by Shane Peacock
- Bradley McGogg, the Very Fine Frog (2009), a book by Tim Beiser, illustrated by Rachel Berman
- Brains Benton (1959–61), a series written by Charles Spain Verral. However, after book #1, all the rest were written under the pen name George Wyatt.
- The Brownies (1887–1918), a series by illustrator and author Palmer Cox
- Buzz about Bees (2013), a non-fiction book for ages 7+ by Kari-Lynn Winters

=== C ===
- Caillou (1989), a series of books by Christine L'Heureux
- Camp X (2002), a spy novel by Eric Walters
- Cannibal Adventure (1972), a novel by Willard Price
- Chronicles of Avonlea (1912), a collection of short stories by Lucy Maud Montgomery
- Chronicles of Faerie (1993), a young adult fantasy series by O.R. Melling
- Cinderella Penguin (1992), a book by Janet Perlman

=== D ===
- Darkwing (2007), a young adult fantasy novel by Kenneth Oppel
- Diving Adventure (1970), a book by Willard Price

=== E ===
- Elephant Adventure
- Elixir
- Elliot Moose
- Emily Climbs
- Emily of New Moon
- Emily's Quest

=== F ===
- Firewing
- Franklin the Turtle
- Further Chronicles of Avonlea

=== G ===
- Ghost Train
- Giant; or Waiting for the Thursday Boat
- Gift Days
- Gorilla Adventure
- A Growling Place

=== H ===
- Hana's Suitcase
- Hiding Edith
- The Hunter's Moon
- The Hydrofoil Mystery

=== I ===
- Imagine A Day (2005), a book by Rob Gonsalves and Sarah L. Thomson
- An Island in the Soup

=== J ===
- Jacob Two-Two
- Jane of Lantern Hill
- Jeffrey and Sloth
- Jewels from the Moon

=== K ===
- The Kids Book of Aboriginal Peoples in Canada
- Kilmeny of the Orchard

=== L ===
- The Light-Bearer's Daughter
- Lion Adventure
- Love You Forever

=== M ===
- Magic for Marigold
- Meet Me at the Monkey Trees
- Miss Mousie's Blind Date
- Mistress Pat
- Miya Wears Orange
- Mr. Bass's Planetoid
- Mr. Mugs
- A Mystery for Mr. Bass

=== N ===
- Northwest Passage

=== O ===
- On My Walk
- On the Trapline

=== P ===
- Paddle-to-the-Sea
- The Paper Bag Princess
- Pat of Silver Bush
- Penelope and the Humongous Burp
- The Princess and the Pony
- Project Superhero
- Punkinhead

=== R ===
- The Railroad Adventures of Chen Sing
- Rainbow Valley
- Rilla of Ingleside

=== S ===
- Safari Adventure
- Scaredy Squirrel
- Silverwing (novel)
- Silverwing (series)
- Skybreaker
- The Snow Queen, a 2000 novel by Eileen Kernaghan
- The Song Within My Heart
- South Sea Adventure
- The Stamp Collector
- Starclimber
- The Story Girl
- Stowaway to the Mushroom Planet
- The Summer King
- Sunwing Airlines

=== T ===
- Ten Birds
- Three Little Dreams
- The Orange Shirt Story
- The Three Canadian Pigs: A Hockey Story
- Tiger Adventure
- Time and Mr. Bass
- The Tiny Kite of Eddie Wing
- Too Cold Marigold, a picture book by Sharon van der Laak

=== U ===
- The Ultimate Book of Hockey Trivia for Kids
- Underwater Adventure
- United We Stand

=== V ===
- Volcano Adventure

=== W ===
- The Waiting Dog
- We All Fall Down
- We Found a Hat
- Weird Rules to Follow
- Whale Adventure
- Willard Price's Adventure series
- The Wonderful Flight to the Mushroom Planet

=== Y ===
- Yuck, A Love Story

=== Z ===
- Zorgamazoo

== See also ==
- Lists of books
