= The Orange Shirt Story =

2018 children's book

- Cover art of the book.
- Author: Phyllis Webstad
- Language: English
- Publication date: 2018

The Orange Shirt Story is a 2018 children's book by Phyllis Webstad, depicting her experiences with the residential school system. The book is illustrated by Brock Nicol. Webstad was given an orange shirt by her grandmother and proudly wore it until it was taken away from her on her first day of school. She went on to create Orange Shirt Day to honour residential school survivors like herself. A Secwepemc language translation is available. Some teachers use The Orange Shirt Story as an educational resource. The book has questions for students to discuss at the end. Phyllis's Orange Shirt is another children's book with similar content but geared towards a younger audience.

== See also ==
- Miya Wears Orange
- Children's literature
- List of Canadian children's books
- Orange Shirt Day
