= Phyllis Webstad =

Canadian author and activist (born 1967)

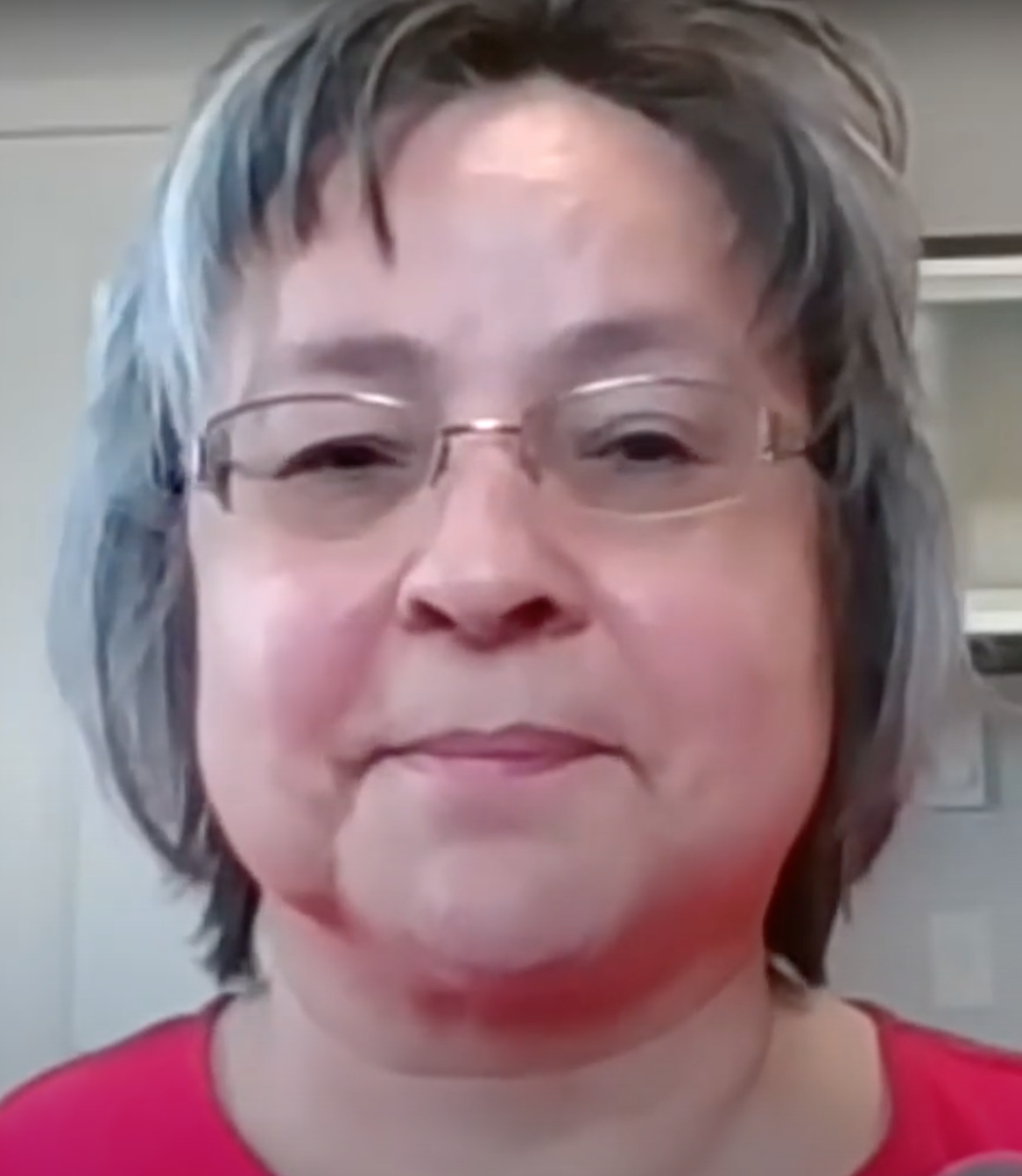
- Webstad in 2022
- Born: Phyllis Jack; July 13, 1967 (age 59); Dog Creek, Cariboo Regional District, (Note: The Stswecem'c Xgat'tem First Nation was established through the merger of the Canoe Creek Band and the Dog Creek Indian Band.) British Columbia, Canada
- Education: Doctorate of Law (honorary)
- Occupations: Author; activist
- Writing career
- Years active: 2018–present
- Genre: Historical
- Subject: Canadian Indian residential school system
- Notable works: The Orange Shirt Story (2018); Phyllis's Orange Shirt (2019); With Our Orange Hearts (2022); Every Child Matters (2023); Today is Orange Shirt Day (2024)
- Notable awards: Thompson Rivers University Distinguished Alumni Award ‒ 2017; Doris Anderson Woman of the Year Award – 2021; Governor General's Meritorious Service Cross (Civil Division) – 2022

Phyllis Webstad (née Jack; born July 13, 1967) is a Canadian Northern Secwépemc author and activist from the Stswecemʼc Xgetʼtem First Nation, and the creator of Orange Shirt Day, a day of remembrance marked in Canada later instated as the public holiday of National Day for Truth and Reconciliation. She is a First Nations residential school survivor. She has written multiple books, including a picture book that illustrates her experiences with the residential school system.

== Orange Shirt Day and National Day for Truth and Reconciliation ==
The inspiration for the Canadian public holiday National Day for Truth and Reconciliation, originally called Orange Shirt Day, came from Webstad, who shared her story at a St. Joseph Mission (SJM) Residential School Commemoration Project and Reunion event held in Williams Lake, British Columbia, in April 2013. Webstad recounted her first day of residential schooling at six years old, when she was stripped of her clothes, including the new orange shirt her grandmother bought her, which was never returned. The orange shirt represents the efforts made by the residential school system to deny children their Indigenous identity. It is held annually on September 30 as a national day of remembrance in Canadian communities, where people are encouraged to wear an orange shirt. It was elevated to a statutory holiday for federal employees by the Canadian government in 2021.

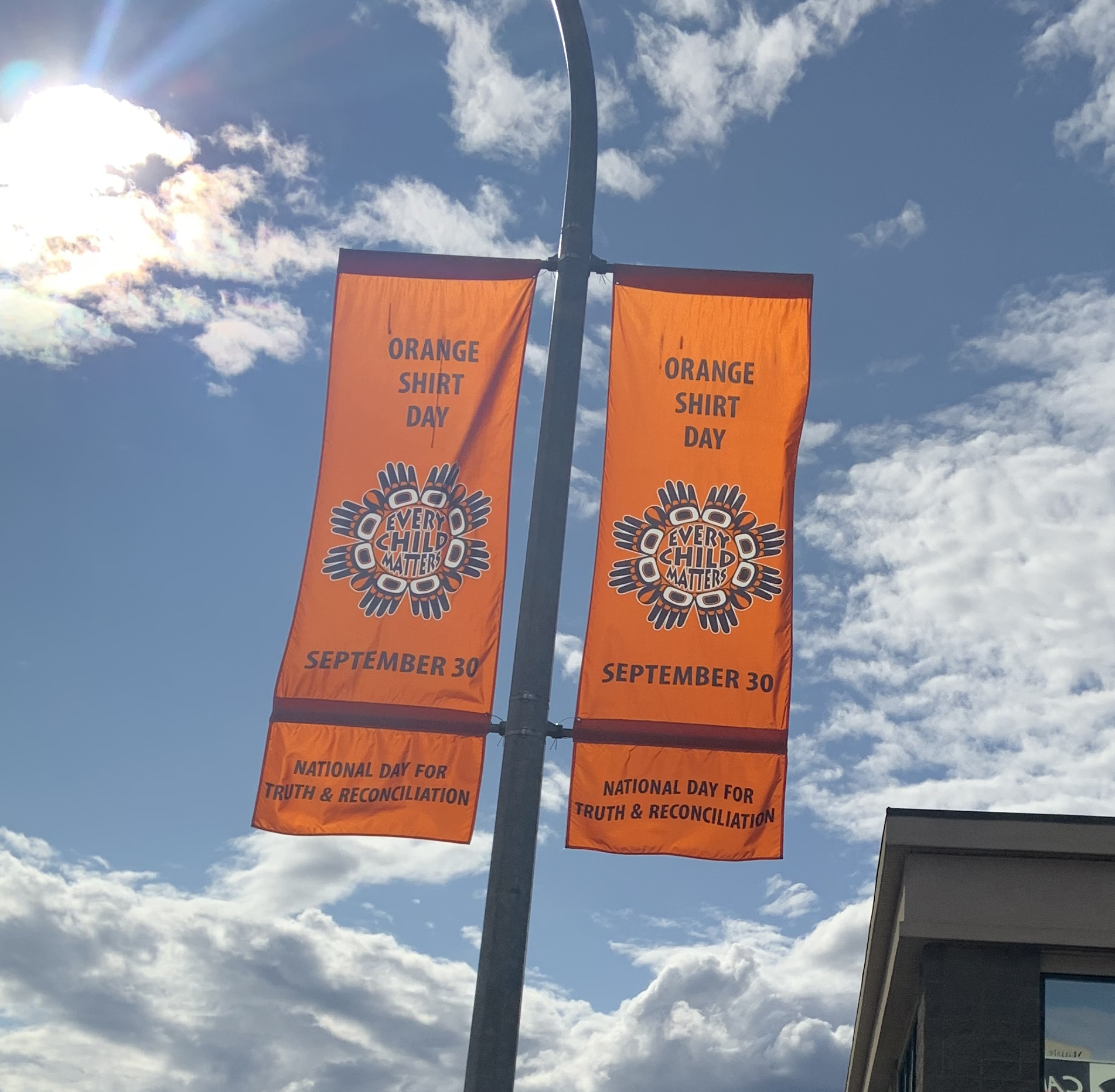
An Orange Shirt Day banner flying in Williams Lake, B.C.

Orange Shirt Day exists as a legacy of the SJM Project, and September 30 signifies the time of year when Indigenous children were historically taken from their homes to residential schools. The official tagline of the day is "Every Child Matters".

In addition to simply wearing an orange shirt, Canadians are encouraged to learn more about the history of residential schools and their assimilation practices, drawing from Phyllis' experience in particular. For instance, many communities have held memorial walks, film screenings, and public lectures to raise awareness about Indigenous history. Canadian school boards have begun to use this event to teach children about the historic system.

== Career ==
Phyllis Webstad's journey as an activist and public speaker began in April 2013 when she shared her residential school story at the St. Joseph's Mission Residential School Commemoration Project and Reunion event in Williams Lake. This marked the first time she had publicly recounted her experience, including the story of her orange shirt.

Following this event, Webstad's story gained traction on social media, leading to the creation of Orange Shirt Day. The day, observed annually on September 30th, aims to educate people about the impact of residential schools and honour the experiences of Indigenous children. The date was chosen as it coincides with the time of year when Indigenous children were historically taken from their homes to residential schools. Orange Shirt Day has since become a significant movement in Canada.

In 2021, the Canadian government elevated Orange Shirt Day to a statutory holiday, establishing the National Day for Truth and Reconciliation.

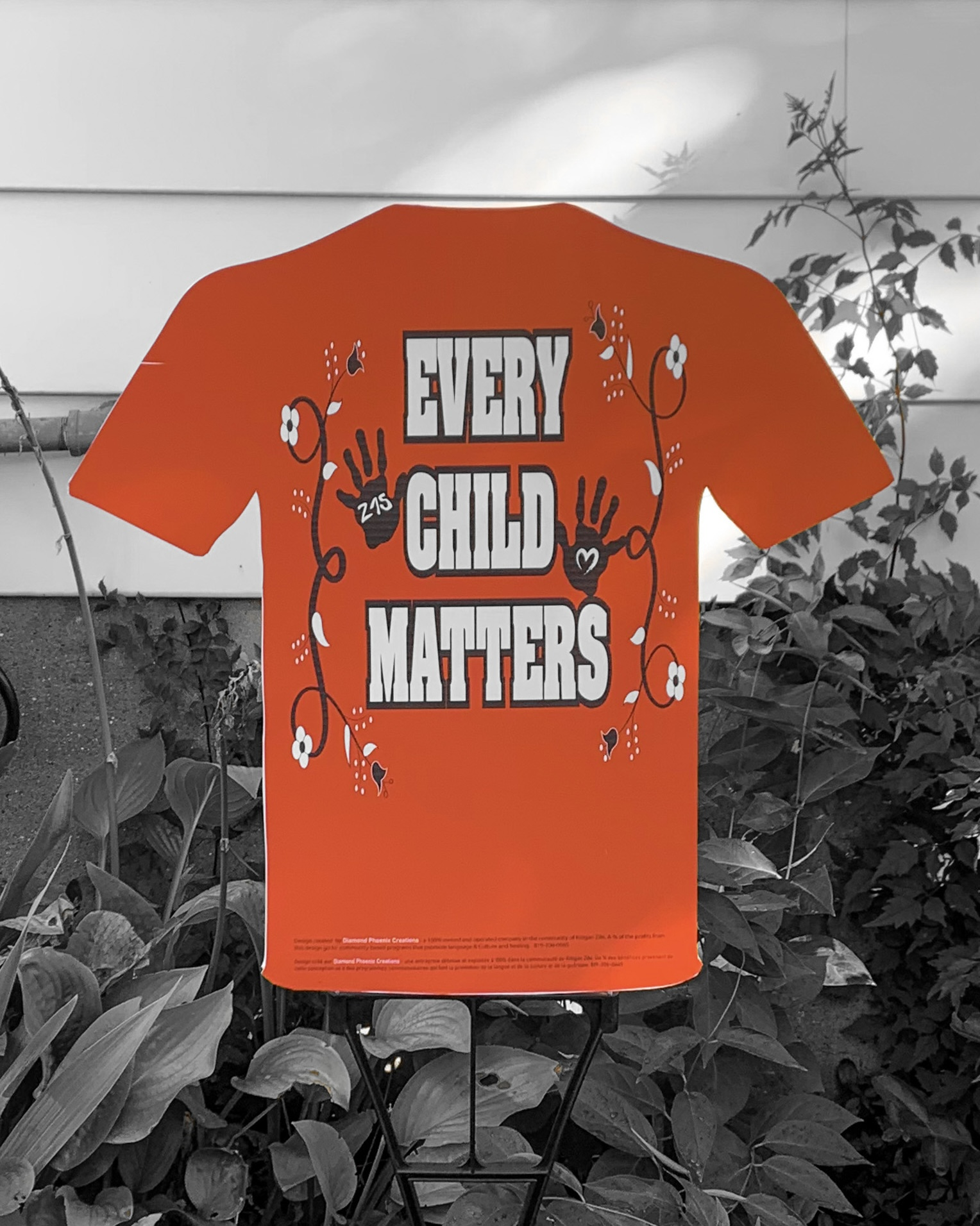
An Every Child Matters sign on display.

Webstad serves as the ambassador for the Orange Shirt Society, a non-profit organization she founded to support reconciliation events and create awareness about the impacts of the residential school system. The society operates with minimal staff, with Webstad at the helm and one part-time employee assisting with administration. The Orange Shirt Society offers programs that "teach the importance of respect and community." Webstad often gives presentations and facilitates workshops. Webstad also participates in the Orange Jersey Project, an initiative of the Orange Shirt Society led by her son. The initiative, which is a collaboration with the Western Hockey League, aims to educate young people about Indigenous history and the value of reconciliation through sports.

She is profiled in Sean Stiller's 2021 documentary film Returning Home.

== Awards ==
In 2017, Webstad received the Community Impact Award from Thompson Rivers University and was recognized as a distinguished alumni.

In September 2021, she won the First Nation Communities Read Award for best Indigenous literature for her book "Beyond The Orange Shirt Story."

In December 2021, she won the 2021 Doris Anderson Woman of the Year award.

In January 2022, Webstad was awarded the Governor General's Meritorious Service Cross in the civil division. This award is given to Canadians for their exceptional deeds accomplished that bring honour to Canada.

== Education ==
In the early 2000s, Webstad enrolled at the Nicola Valley Institute of Technology (NVIT) in Merritt, British Columbia. NVIT is British Columbia's Indigenous public post-secondary institution, offering programs that are relevant to Indigenous learners and communities. At NVIT, Webstad earned a diploma in business administration. Webstad continued her education at Thompson Rivers University (TRU) in Kamloops, British Columbia. At TRU, she pursued and obtained a diploma in accounting.

On October 6, 2023, Simon Fraser University (SFU) in Burnaby, British Columbia, awarded Webstad an honorary Doctorate of Laws degree. The conferral of this honorary degree took place during SFU's fall convocation ceremony.

== Personal life ==
=== Early life ===
Webstad was born on July 13, 1967, on the Dog Creek Reserve, approximately 85 kilometers south of Williams Lake, British Columbia.

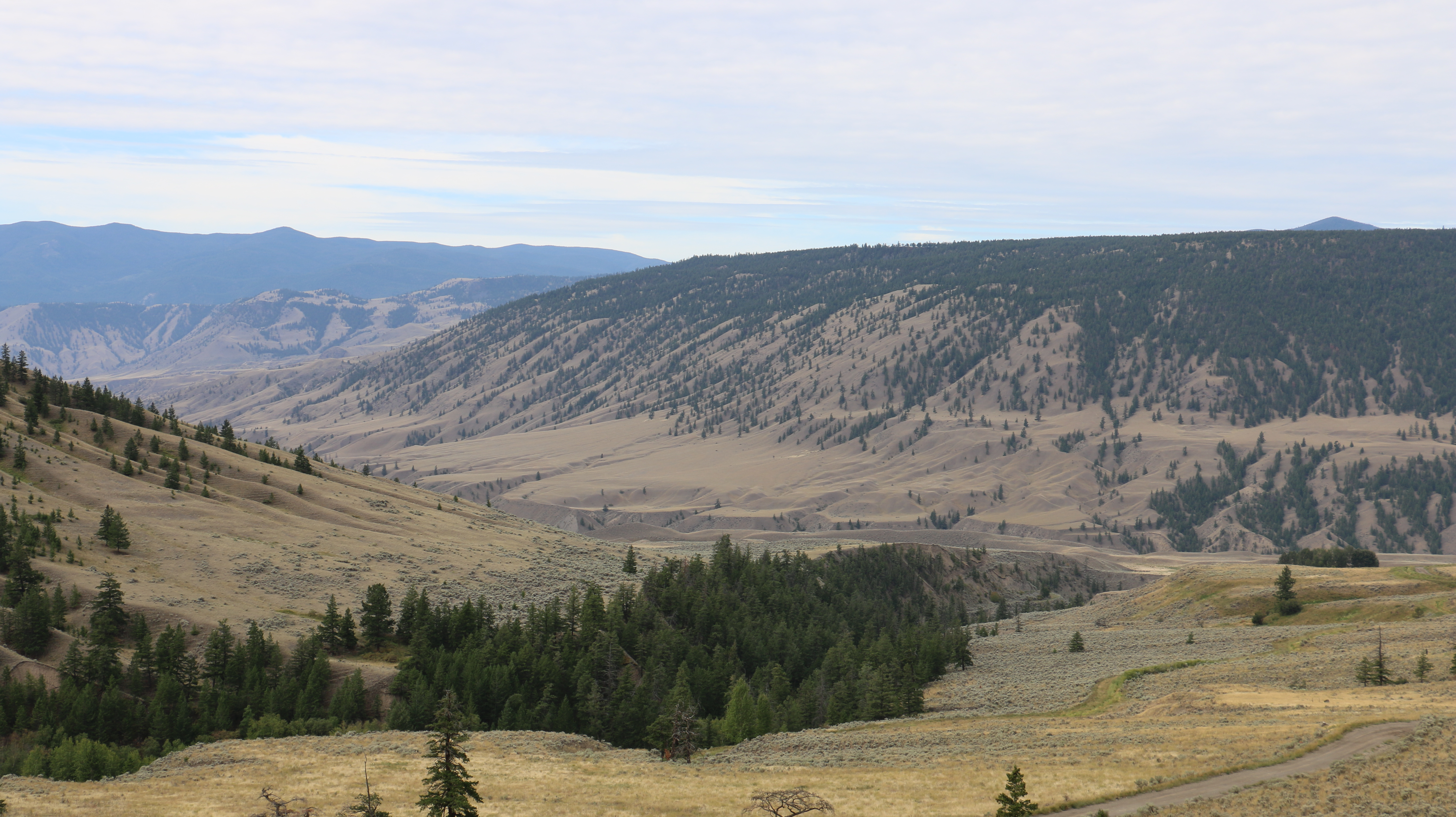
Canoe Creek, British Columbia

Webstad was primarily raised by her grandmother on the Dog Creek Reserve until she was ten. Their home lacked modern amenities such as electricity and running water. Despite these challenges, Webstad recalls a childhood rich in traditional practices and connection to the land. The family lived off the land, maintaining three gardens in the valley and storing food in a cellar. Webstad participated in catching sockeye salmon along the Fraser River at night. They would gut the fish, cut them up, and place them on drying racks in the morning. Berry picking was a common activity. During summers, Webstad's grandmother, the youngest of ten siblings, would take her and her cousin to camp along the Fraser River.

Webstad's family has a multi-generational history with the residential school system. Her mother and father were largely absent during her early years, leading to feelings of abandonment. Her grandmother, who didn't have a paying job, was her primary caregiver and taught her traditional ways of living. Webstad's great-grandmother, born in 1880, grew up under the oppressive Indian Act and believed that residential schools would provide opportunities for her descendants. Both Webstad's mother and grandmother attended St. Joseph's Mission Residential School for ten years each.

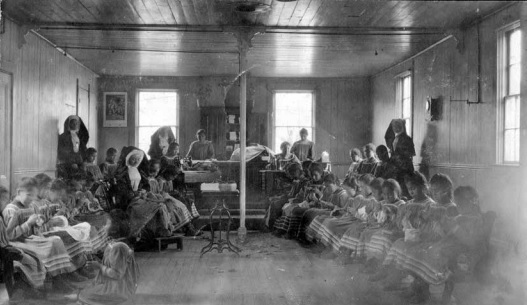
Girls sewing at St. Joseph's Mission Residential School.

On September 30, 1973, at the age of six, Webstad was sent to St. Joseph's Mission Residential School, located just outside Williams Lake. Before leaving, Webstad's grandmother took her shopping for new clothes. Webstad chose a shiny orange shirt, which symbolized her excitement about school. On her first day, upon arrival, school authorities stripped Webstad of her clothes, including the new orange shirt, which was never returned. This traumatic experience would later become the inspiration for Orange Shirt Day.

Webstad spent one year at St. Joseph's Mission, where she was bussed to a different school in Williams Lake for classes during the day and returned to the residential school at night. During her time at the school, Webstad had minimal contact with her family, as was common in the residential school system. The residential school system aimed to assimilate Indigenous children, often forbidding them from speaking their native languages or practicing their cultural traditions.

The following year, a school was established on the Dog Creek Reserve, allowing Webstad to return home and live with her grandmother. The experiences at the residential school later influenced her later work in reconciliation efforts.

Webstad had her son while she was 13 years old.

=== Adulthood ===
Phyllis Webstad is married and resides in Williams Lake. She has one biological son as well as a step-son. Webstad is also a grandmother to five grandchildren.

Webstad has noted that her grandkids are the first to have grown up with both of their parents. Her eldest grandson has received certification to become a paramedic, an achievement she has publicly acknowledged.

In interviews, Webstad has shared that her journey of healing and self-discovery has been ongoing. She continues to advocate for the importance of mental health and well-being, both for herself and for other residential school survivors.

== Works ==
=== Picture books ===
- Webstad, Phyllis (2018). The Orange Shirt Story. Medicine Wheel Publishing. ISBN 978-0-9938694-9-5.
- Webstad, Phyllis (2019). Phyllis's Orange Shirt. Medicine Wheel Publishing. ISBN 978-1-989122-24-2.
- Webstad, Phyllis (2022). With Our Orange Hearts. Medicine Wheel Publishing. ISBN 978-1-989122-97-6.
- Webstad, Phyllis (2023). Every Child Matters. Medicine Wheel Publishing. ISBN 978-1-77854-016-5.
- Webstad, Phyllis (2024). Today Is Orange Shirt Day. Medicine Wheel Publishing. ISBN 978-1-77854-036-3.

=== Memoir ===
- Webstad, Phyllis (2026). w7ec n7élye ey We Are Still Here. Medicine Wheel Publishing. ISBN 9781778541018.

=== Story ===
- Webstad, Phyllis (2021). Beyond the Orange Shirt Story. Medicine Wheel Publishing. ISBN 978-1-989122-75-4.

=== Film ===
- Stiller, Sean; Webstad, Phyllis (2021). Returning Home (documentary). Canadian Geographic.

== See also ==
- Miya Wears Orange
