= Thomas Aquinas Maguire =

American writer

Thomas Aquinas Maguire is an American writer and illustrator of children's picture books. His first book A Growling Place was published by Simply Read Books in August 2007. His second release from Simply Read Books Three Little Dreams is a collection of three fold-out books, it was released in the summer of 2010. In 2011 Simply Read Books released Maguires' third picture book The Wild Swans.

== Books ==
A Growling Place, Simply Read books, 2007. A traditional storybook about a girl who rescues a stuffed bear. The book features a simplified chapter system. The table of contents show the color-coded chapter names and the chapter names appear directly in the text of the book as the story is told.

Three Little Dreams, Simply Read books, 2010. This is Maguires first attempt to create stories as single long images. This storytelling technique is taken to an extreme in "The Wild Swans". Three Little Dreams is a box set of three small unfolding books; each book represents a dream that unfolds to about 3 feet in length.

1. Of Night and of Flight
2. Of Dragons and Drowse
3. Of Sleep and of Sheep

The Wild Swans, Simply Read books, 2011. A fully illustrated edition of the classic Hans Christian Andersen story. The book is told in one single long image that measures 6.5 inches tall and unfolds to over 60 feet wide. The book is packaged in a box that also includes a small booklet with the original Andersen story.

== Awards ==
- 2nd place in The 26th Annual Awards for Excellence in Book Design in Canada by the Alcuin Society for A Growling Place
