= The Singing Stone =

1984 novel by O. R. Melling

- Author: O. R. Melling
- Language: English
- Publisher: Viking Kestrel
- Publication date: 1984
- Publication place: United States, Canada

The Singing Stone is a young adult novel by O. R. Melling that follows a modern-day girl named Kay as she travels to Ireland and travels back to Bronze-Age Ireland. She alongside Aherne of the Tuatha Dé Danann must find the lost treasures of the Tuatha Dé Danann to combat the upcoming invasion. The novel was first published in 1984. It has sold over 25,000 copies.

The book was shortlisted for the Ruth Schwartz Children's Book Award in 1987.

== Reception ==
The Globe and Mail described it as "a lively adventure exhibiting more than a little ingenious sleight-of-mind magic".
