= The Book of Dreams (Melling novel) =

2003 novel by O. R. Melling

- First edition
- Author: O. R. Melling
- Language: English
- Series: Chronicles of Faerie
- Genre: Fantasy
- Publisher: Puffin Canada
- Publication date: 2003
- Publication place: Canada
- Preceded by: The Light-Bearer's Daughter

The Book of Dreams is a fantasy novel by O. R. Melling. It is the fourth and last book in the Chronicles of Faerie series. The first three books are The Hunter's Moon, The Summer King and The Light-Bearer's Daughter.

== Plot ==
The gateways between Faerie and the Earthworld have been destroyed by the Enemy. The only hope of ever bridging the two worlds again lies with Dana, a troubled teenager now living in Toronto. In a dream, Dana is told by her fairy mother, Edane, that the key to restoring the gateways is in The Book of Dreams. But quest she does, the length and breadth of the land, pursued by evil forces and aided by many new friends including Gwen and Laurel of the Companions of Faerie, and Jean, a classmate from Quebec with his own dark secret. Soon, Dana discovers that Canada is home to magic as frightening and wondrous as anything she left behind in Ireland.

== Reception ==
The Book of Dreams received positive reviews from professional critics. In its review Kirkus Reviews described the novel as a broader and more ambitious installment in The Chronicles of Faerie series, noting its extended narrative scope compared to its predecessors.

A Quill & Quire review highlighted the incorporation of diverse cultural references and the psychological depth of the narrative, while suggesting that its expansive cast and thematic goals sometimes resulted in a diffuse focus.

CM Magazine praised the anthology of myth and magic in the book, describing it as engaging and inspirational, though potentially challenging for younger readers due to its cultural complexity.
