= Jirina Marton =

Canadian artist and illustrator (born 1946)

- Born: April 19, 1946 (age 80); Liberec, Czech Republic
- Education: Academy of Arts, Architecture and Design in Prague
- Occupations: Artist; illustrator

Jirina Marton (born April 19, 1946) is a Czech-born Canadian artist and illustrator.

She was born in Liberec, studied at the School of Applied Arts in Prague and continued her studies in Paris. Marton had her first exhibitions there and also began illustrating children's books. She came to Canada in 1985 and now lives in Toronto.

Her books have been published in France, Canada, Switzerland, Spain, Japan, China and Korea. Her illustrations have appeared in exhibitions in Italy, Japan and Canada.

== Selected works ==
Sources:

- I'll Do It Myself (1989)
- Amelia's Celebration (1992), received the Grand Prize at the Itabashi Picture Book Contest
- Lady Kaguya's Secret: A Japanese Tale (1997)
- The Bear Says North: Tales from Northern Lands (2003) text by Bob Barton
- Arctic Adventures: Tales from the Lives of Inuit Artists (2007) text by Raquel Rivera
- Marja’s Skis (2007) text by Jean E. Pendziwol
- Bella's Tree (2009) text by Janet Russell, received the Governor General's Award for English-language children's illustration
