= Brenda Silsbe =

Canadian children's writer (born 1953)

- Born: October 10, 1953 (age 72); Terrace, British Columbia, Canada
- Citizenship: Canadian
- Education: University of British Columbia
- Occupation: Writer
- Writing career
- Genre: Children's Fiction

Brenda Silsbe (born 1953) is a Canadian children's writer.

== Background ==
Brenda Silsbe (née Taft) was born October 10, 1953, in Terrace, British Columbia, Canada. In 1977 she received a Bachelor of Education degree from the University of British Columbia and returned to Terrace to teach primary school. Silsbe had her first work of children's fiction published in 1989 by Annick Press.

== Published works ==
- The Bears We Know (Annikin), illustrations by Scot Ritchie (Annick Press, 1989) ISBN 1-55037-048-0
- Just One More Colour, illustrations by Shawn Steffler (Annick Press, 1991) ISBN 1-55037-133-9 (bound) ISBN 1-55037-136-3 (pbk.)
- Winning the Girl of the Sea, illustrations by Alice Priestley (Annick Press, 1994) ISBN 1-55037-312-9 (trade) ISBN 1-55037-136-3 (lib. bdg.)
- The Watcher, illustrations by Alice Priestley (Annick Press, 1995) ISBN 1-55037-385-4 (bound) ISBN 1-55037-384-6 (pbk.)
- W. Haigh, Animal Poet (ITP Nelson, 1998) ISBN 0-17-607417-1
- The Duet, illustrations by Galan Akin (Hodgepog Books, 2000) ISBN 0-9686899-1-4
- A tree is just a tree?, illustrations by Yayo (Lobster Press, 2001) ISBN 1-894222-35-0
- The Bears We Know, illustrations by Vlasta van Kampen (Annick Press, 2009) ISBN 978-1-55451-167-9 (bound) ISBN 978-1-55451-166-2 (pbk.)
