= David Bouchard =

Canadian author

David Bouchard is a Canadian author and former high school principal.

Bouchard was born and raised in Saskatchewan. He is a Member of the Order of Canada and a public school in Oshawa, Ontario is named after him. In his 2017 book, Proud to Be Métis, Bouchard writes that his grandfather had Ojibwa and Osage roots, but never spoke of them. In a book interview with the Canadian Broadcasting Corporation, Bouchard said, "We struggle with whether or not we have the right to reclaim that heritage, of if in fact because we weren't raised in that environment, we can even do that."

In 2008 Bouchard became a member of the Order of Canada.

== Bibliography ==
- Long Powwow Nights, with Pam Aleekuk, illustrated by Leonard Paul, music (CD) by Buffy Sainte-Marie, (2009, Red Deer Press).
- The Secrit of Your Name/Kiimouch Ka Shinikashooyen, illustrated by Dennis J. Weber, music (CD) by John Arcand, (2010, Red Deer Press).
- The Drum Calls Softly (2008, Red Deer Press), bilingual (English & Cree), illustrated by Jim Poitras, music by Northern Cree, Cree translation by Steve Wood, is a 2009 Canadian Children's Book Centre Our Choice and 2010 BolognaRagazzi Award Mention book. See: Round Dance.
- Aboriginal Carol (2007, Red Deer Press), illustrated by Moses Beaver, bilingual (English & Inuktitut), translation and music by Susan Aglukark, was awarded a White Raven by the International Youth Library
- Nokum: is My Teacher, Illustrated by Allen Sapp. Music by Northern Cree. (2006, Red Deer Press). Nokum was shortlisted for the 2018 TD Canadian Children's Literature Award.
- The Song within my Heart illustrations by Allen Sapp (2003, Raincoast Books) In 2003, he received the Governor General's Award for English language children's illustration for the book, The Song Within My Heart.
- Dragon New Year (1999, Peachtree Publishers)
- The Great Race (1997)
- For the Love of Reading: Books to Build Lifelong Readers (2004, Orca), with Sally Bender, Anne Letain, and Lucie Poulin-Mackey
