= Returning Home (2021 film) =

- Directed by: Sean Stiller
- Produced by: Gilles Gagnier; Andrew Lovesey; Tim Joyce
- Starring: Phyllis Webstad
- Cinematography: Sean Stiller
- Edited by: Katharine Asals
- Music by: Melody McKiver
- Production company: Canadian Geographic
- Release date: September 26, 2021 (Lunenburg)
- Running time: 72 minutes
- Country: Canada
- Language: English

Returning Home is a Canadian documentary film, directed by Sean Stiller and released in 2021. The film is a portrait of Phyllis Webstad, an Indian residential school survivor who founded Orange Shirt Day, and depicts both her national speaking tour about the residential schools and the activism of her home Secwepemc community around the decline of the Pacific salmon.

It was the first full-length feature film ever produced by Canadian Geographic magazine.

The film premiered on the online platform of the Lunenburg Doc Fest on September 26, 2021, before having its official theatrical premiere on September 27 at the Chan Centre for the Performing Arts in Vancouver, British Columbia. It was subsequently screened at the Calgary International Film Festival, the Edmonton International Film Festival and the 2021 Vancouver International Film Festival.

== Awards ==
Award	Date of ceremony	Category	Recipient(s)	Result	Ref(s)
Calgary International Film Festival	2021	Best Canadian Documentary	Sean Stiller	Won	
Edmonton International Film Festival	2021	Best Canadian Documentary	Sean Stiller	Won	
Vancouver International Film Festival	2021	Best Canadian Documentary	Sean Stiller	Won	
