= Allen Sapp =

Canadian Cree painter

- Born: Sa-pu-num Kiskayetum; January 2, 1928; Red Pheasant Cree Nation, Saskatchewan, Canada
- Died: December 29, 2015 (aged 87); North Battleford, Saskatchewan
- Spouse: Margaret Sapp
- Awards: Order of Canada; Saskatchewan Order of Merit
- Website: www.allensapp.com

Allen Sapp OC SOM RCA (January 2, 1928 – December 29, 2015) was a Canadian Cree painter, who resided in North Battleford, Saskatchewan. His art and his story have become known throughout Canada. Many of his paintings feature images of his grandmother. His work and life story have been the subject of a number of books and television documentaries.

== Early life ==
Sapp was born on the Red Pheasant Reserve, south of the city of North Battleford. His mother suffered from tuberculosis and died during his adolescence.

Sapp was raised by his maternal grandmother and grandfather, Albert and Maggie Soonias. As a child he was often ill and spent long hours in bed. His grandmother nurtured him and encouraged his love of drawing, while teaching him in the Cree ways.

He attended the Red Pheasant school, but his grandfather removed him from the school because he needed him on the farm. Sapp remained at home and cared for his grandmother until she died in 1963.

== Career ==
After her death, Sapp moved to North Battleford to try to make a living as an artist, selling paintings door to door. In 1966 he met Dr. Allan Gonor, who recognized Sapp's talent and encouraged him to paint what he knew—life on the reserve. Sapp began to paint his childhood memories, often staying up all night painting. Gonor helped him to sell several paintings to the Winnipeg Art Gallery. In 1969, 40 of his paintings were displayed in an exhibition at the Robertson Galleries. By the 1970s, his work was known across North America and as far away as London, England.

In 1986, he was made an Officer of the Order of Canada "for his portrayals of Native peoples and of life on the reserve". In 1985, he was awarded the Saskatchewan Order of Merit. In 1975, he was elected to the Royal Canadian Academy of Arts.

In spite of his artistic success, Sapp's lack of education and disinterest in practical matters led to difficulties in managing his finances. He and his wife continued to live in a small home near North Battleford. He died in his sleep on December 29, 2015. His paintings illustrate the award-winning Nokum: is My Teacher by David Bouchard with music by the drum group Northern Cree.

The 2003 book by David Bouchard, The Song within my Heart, Illustrated by Sapp, tells the story of Sapp's childhood. In 2003, he received the Governor General's Award for English language children's illustration for the book, The Song Within My Heart.

In North Battleford, a gallery has been created to display Sapp's paintings.
