= A Growling Place =

2007 picture book by Thomas Aquinas Maguire

- Cover from A Growling Place (2007)
- Author: Thomas Aquinas Maguire
- Illustrator: Thomas Aquinas Maguire
- Genre: Children's picture book
- Published: 2007 (Simply Read Books)
- Publication place: Canada
- Media type: Watercolor and Graphite
- Pages: 32
- ISBN: 978-1-894965-74-3
- OCLC: 173303970

A Growling Place is a picture book written and illustrated by American children's writer Thomas Aquinas Maguire, published on August 28, 2007, by Simply Read Books in Vancouver, British Columbia. The book follows a young girl named Ari and is told primarily with long horizontal images and few words. Though it is a picture book, A Growling Place makes use of chapters: each chapter name is a simple concept in the progression of the story and is highlighted in the sentence in which it appears.

CM Magazine's Catherine Howett gave the book a half star out of four possible stars. Howett praised Maguire's illustrations, noting that he "is obviously a gifted artist. The minimal, alliterative storyline is nicely presented with font and colour changes, but it serves primarily as a vehicle for the wonderful dark line drawings that evoke Sendak. These are very active images that advance the narrative in the absence of text." However, Howett questioned the book's target audience, noting that although it "is marketed as a bed-time book for young children, it lacks narrative force, and the text is perhaps too abstract for this age group". They further mention, "Although this imaginary journey shows Aril facing her fears of loss and ‘bear terrors,’ the ending does not resolve the conflict in a truly satisfying manner."

In 2007, A Growling Place won second place at the Alcuin Society's 26th Annual Awards for Excellence in Book Design in Canada.
