= Don Gillmor =

Canadian journalist, novelist, historian and writer

- Education: University of Calgary (B.A., 1977)
- Occupations: Journalist; novelist; historian; children's writer
- Writing career
- Notable works: Kanata; Mount Pleasant; To the River
- Notable awards: Governor General's Award for English-language non-fiction (2000, 2019); Libris Award (2001); National Newspaper Award (2014); National Magazine Awards

Don Gillmor is a Canadian journalist, novelist, historian, and writer of children's books; he is the recipient of many awards for his journalism and fiction.

== Career ==
Gillmor's writing has appeared in Saturday Night, The Globe and Mail, the Toronto Star, Rolling Stone, GQ, National Geographic, and Toronto Life. He worked as senior editor at The Walrus. He also served on the faculty of the Literary Journalism Program at the Banff Centre.

Gillmor's magazine writing has earned him twelve National Magazine Awards, and he has been called "one of Canada’s most celebrated profile writers". In 2014, he won a National Newspaper Award for an article on baby boomers and suicide.

Gillmor is the author of five works of fiction: Kanata (2009), a Canadian historical epic; Mount Pleasant (2013), a comic novel about debt; Long Change (2015), which explores the life of an oilman (Gillmor worked on an oil rig in the late 1970s); Breaking and Entering (2023), a novel about a middle-aged woman who learns lock picking; and Cherry Beach (2026), a crime novel set in Toronto. He has also written books of non-fiction, including the two-volume work Canada: A People's History co-authored with Pierre Turgeon, which accompanied the award-winning television program of the same name and won the 2001 Libris Award for non-fiction book of the year. Among his children's books are Yuck, A Love Story (2000), which won the 2000 Governor General's Award for English-language children's literature, and The Fabulous Song (1996), which won a Mr. Christie's Book Award.

In 2019 he won the Governor General's Award for English-language non-fiction for his book To the River: Losing My Brother.

== Personal life ==
Gillmor graduated from the University of Calgary with a B.A. in 1977.

He currently resides in Toronto.

== Bibliography ==
=== Non-fiction ===
- Canada: A People’s History, Volume I (2000)
- Canada: A People’s History, Volume II (2001)
- The Desire of Every Living Thing (2000)
- Insight and On Site: The Work of Diamond + Schmitt (2008)
- Stratford Behind the Scenes (2012)
- To the River (2018)

=== Fiction ===
- Kanata (2009)
- Mount Pleasant (2013)
- Long Change (2015)
- Breaking and Entering (2023)
- Cherry Beach (2026)

=== Children's books ===
- The Trouble with Justin (1993)
- When Vegetables Go Bad (1994)
- The Fabulous Song (1995)
- The Christmas Orange (1998)
- Yuck, A Love Story (2000)
- Sophie and the Sea Monster (2005)
- The Boy Who Ate the World (2008)
- The Time Time Stopped (2011)
