= Scot Ritchie =

Canadian author and illustrator

- Born: September 12, 1954 (age 71); Vancouver, British Columbia
- Occupations: Author and illustrator

Scot Ritchie (born September 12, 1954, in Vancouver) is a Canadian author and illustrator. He specializes in children's literature and has over 65 books published. He also illustrates for the advertising, editorial and educational markets. His work can be found in publications including Wall St. Journal, Newsweek, Chicago Tribune, and New York Magazine. His books have been translated into many languages including Korean, Chinese, Dutch, French, Arabic, Russian and Polish.

== Biography ==
Ritchie was born September 12, 1954, in Vancouver to Ross Brian and Geraldine Ritchie.

He received a Bachelor of Fine Arts from the University of British Columbia in 1974.

== Awards and honours ==
- Skipping Stones Honour List, Skipping Stones Magazine, Winner 2021
- Best Books for Kids + Teens, Starred Selection, Canadian Children's Book Centre, Winner 2019
- Best Children's Books of the Year, Bank Street College, Listed 2018
- Best Books for Kids and Teens, The Canadian Children's Book Centre, Winner 2018
- Winner: BC Kids Summer Reading Club Illustrator of the Year, 2009
- Canadian Children's Book Centre Giveaway Book of the Year, 2009 (for Let's Go! The Story of Getting from There to Here)
- Shortlisted: Cybil Award Nonfiction Picture Books, 2007 (for Let's Go!)
- Nominated: Amelia Frances Howard-Gibbon Illustrator's Award, 2007 (for Let's Go!)
- Winner: Alcuin Society Awards for Excellence in Book Design in Canada, 1984 (for Dinner at Auntie Rose’s)
- Finalist: Canadian Toy Testing Council "Great Books for Children," 2001 (for Why? The best ever question and answer book about science, nature and the world around you)
- Winner: "Parents' Guide to Children's Media Award," 2000 (for My Baby Brother and Me and My Baby Sister and Me)

== Selected publications ==
=== Children's non-fiction, author & illustrator ===
- Tug: A Log Boom's Journey (Groundwood 2022)
- See Where We Come From! A First Book of Family Heritage (Kids Can Press 2021)
- Lilliana and the Frogs (Harbour Publishing 2020)
- Follow Your Breath! A First Book of Mindfulness (Kids Can Press 2020)
- Owen at the Park (Groundwood 2019)
- My House is Alive! (OwlKids Books 2016)
- Federica (Groundwood Books 2017)
- P'esk'a and the First Salmon Ceremony (Groundwood Books 2015)
- See How We Move! A First Book of Health and Well Being (Kids Can Press 2018)
- See What We Eat! A First Book of Healthy Eating (Kids Can Press 2017)
- Look Where We Live! A First Book of Community Building (Kids Can Press 2015)
- Look at That Building! A First Book of Structures (Kids Can Press 2011)
- Follow That Map! A First Book of Mapping Skills (Kids Can Press, 2009)
- Everything Kids' Spies Puzzle & Activity Book (Adams Media, 2008)
- Everything Kids' Dragons Puzzle and Activity Book (Adams Media, 2008)
- Everything Kids' Connect-the-Dots and Puzzle Book (Adams Media, 2008)
- Crazy Mazey Houses (Little Hare Books, 2008)
- Up, Up, and Away: A Round-the-World Puzzle Adventure (Maple Tree Press, 2006)

=== Children's illustrator ===
- If You Can Dream It, You Can Do It by Colleen Nelson and Kathie MacIsaac (Pajama Press, 2022)
- Dinos Driving by Lynn Leitch (Pajama Press, 2022)
- On the Line by Kari-Lynn Winters (Pajama Press, 2021)
- There Was an Old Lady Who Swallowed a Moose by Chrissy Bozik (Scholastic 2019)
- How? The Most Awesome Question and Answer Book About Nature, Animals, People, Places - and You! by Catherine Ripley (OwlKids 2019)
- What Milly Did by Elise Moser (Groundwood Books, 2016)
- Let's Go: The Story of Getting from Here to There, by L. Flatt (Maple Tree Press, 2007)
- aRHYTHMetic: A book and a half of poetry about math, by K. Winters, T. Stone, and L. Sherritt-Fleming (Gumboot Books, 2009)
- Why?: The Best Ever Question and Answer Book About Nature, Science, and the World Around You, by C. Ripley (Maple Tree Press, 2004)
- My Class and Me: Kindergarten Memory Scrapbook, by M. Leatherdale (Kids Can Press, 2003)
- My Grandmother and Me Memory Scrapbook, by J. Drake, A. Love (Kids Can Press, 1999)
- Hockey (Basics for Beginners), by L. Wark (Kids Can Press, 1994)
- The Bears We Know, by Brenda Silsbe (Annikins, 1989)
- My Father and Me Memory Scrapbook, by J. Drake, A. Love (Kids Can Press, 2000)

=== Anthology contributions, illustrator ===
- "Rhyme or Reason" by K. Winters, in World of Stories (Gumboot Books, 2008)
