= Three Little Dreams =

2010 picture book by Thomas Aquinas Maguire

- Author: Thomas Aquinas Maguire
- Illustrator: Thomas Aquinas Maguire
- Cover artist: Thomas Aquinas Maguire
- Genre: Children's picture book
- Publisher: Simply Read Books
- Publication date: July 15, 2010
- Publication place: Canada
- Media type: Watercolor and Graphite
- Pages: 24
- ISBN: 978-1-894965-79-8

Three Little Dreams is a wordless picture book illustrated by Thomas Aquinas Maguire, published on July 25, 2010, by Simply Read Books in Vancouver, British Columbia.

== Description ==
This is a boxed set of three separate books. The set of three books cover three different characters and their dreams. The dreams are entitled "Of Night and Of Flight", "Of Dragons and Drowse" and "Of Sheep and of Sleep". The books unfold in an accordion style and when completely unfurled present themselves as a single polyptych image. The sequence in the stories is flowing and represents the passage of time and single moments concurrently.

The books are cyclical and end where they begin, thus blurring the line between dream and reality.

"Of Night and Of Flight" This dream features a bird who wakes up and strangely has human arms and hands. He is a piano player but he dreams of being a real bird with real wings. In his dream he sprouts wings, falls asleep and wakes up to find that he has hands again.

"Of Dragons and Drowse" This dream features a young boy asleep on the couch - he awakes to a strange catlike red dragon flying by the window. He crawls out of his window onto the tail of the beast. The dragon delivers him home and he slowly floats back onto the couch.

"Of Sleep and of Sheep" In this story the moon morphs into a sheep who climbs into a girl's window - the sheep gives her some wool and she immediately falls asleep. The sheep then climbs out of the window and, in subsequent pages, morphs back into the moon.
