= O. R. Melling =

Irish-Canadian writer (born 1952)

- Born: Geraldine Valerie Whelan; 2 December 1952 (age 73); Bray, County Wicklow, Ireland
- Education: Trinity College, Toronto
- Occupation: Novelist
- Children: 1
- Writing career
- Genre: Fantasy literature
- Notable awards: Canadian Library Association Young Adult Book Award
- Website: ormelling.com

Geraldine Valerie Whelan (born 2 December 1952), known by the pen name O. R. Melling, is a writer of fantasy novels, mostly for children and young adults. Melling's novels focus on Irish and Celtic folklore. She writes reviews and film scripts as G. V. Whelan. She is sometimes published as Orla Melling.

== Early life and education ==
Melling was born in Ireland, but moved with her family to Toronto, Ontario when she was four. Her father was a musician and she had nine brothers and sisters.

Melling was educated at Loretto College School in Toronto. She studied philosophy, Celtic Studies and mediaeval history at Trinity College, University of Toronto.

== Career ==
Melling has said that she started writing after dropping out of studying law: "Writing gave me the excuse I needed to leave my law studies".

Melling has been awarded the Canadian Library Association Young Adult Book Award for The Druid's Tale, and the Ruth Schwartz Award for Children's Literature. The Druid's Tale has been translated into Czech and Japanese.

Her influences include Patricia Lynch.

Melling has also worked as a teacher of Irish dance and been an officer in the Royal Canadian Navy.

== Critical response ==
The critic Ciara Ní Bhroin has described Melling's novels as "weaving ... modern Canadian protagonists into ancient myth". She identifies a "nostalgic, regressive strain" in The Druid's Tale, and writes that "Melling both confirms and denies traditional portrayals of Ireland and the feminine". Ní Bhroin positions Melling's work within Anglo-Irish literature.

== Personal life ==
Melling lives in Bray, County Wicklow. She has a daughter.

== Books ==
- Melling, O.R. (1983). The Druid's Tune. Amulet. ISBN 9780143016748.
- — (1986). The Singing Stone. Amulet. ISBN 9780143016670.
- — (1989). Falling Out of Time. Ontario: Viking, Markham. ISBN 9780670814213.
- The Chronicles of Faerie series (1993–2003)
  - — (1993). The Hunter's Moon. Amulet Books. ISBN 9781435274303.
  - — (1999). The Summer King. Amulet. ISBN 978-0-616-14663-7.
  - — (2001). The Light-Bearer's Daughter. Amulet. ISBN 9780141309927.
  - — (2003). The Book of Dreams. Amulet. ISBN 9780810984189.
- — (1996). My Blue Country. Toronto: CNIB. ISBN 9780616753682.
- — (2013). People of the Great Journey. Hay House. ISBN 9781781802076.
