= Miya Wears Orange =

Children's book

Cover art for the book

Miya Wears Orange is a book intended for children between the ages of 6 and 8 written by Cree writer Wanda John-Kehewin. It is about a girl named Miya who learns about residential schools for the first time at school herself, becomes scared that she will be taken away, and has a conversation with her mother about it. Miya is the only Indigenous student in her class. The book is illustrated by Erika Rodriguez Medina.

Miya is named after John-Kehewin's own daughter. The book was favourably reviewed by Muskrat Magazine, where the reviewer shared that her daughter having an experience similar to Miya's when learning about residential schools. The review states that it "is not easy to write a children’s book about such a sensitive and painful subject; however, Miya Wears Orange succeeds by presenting it in a way that is both accessible and hopeful".

== See also ==
- The Orange Shirt Story
- Orange Shirt Day
- Children's literature
- List of Canadian children's books
