= Fitzhenry & Whiteside =

Canadian book publishing and distribution company

- Parent company: Sutherland House
- Founded: 1966
- Founders: Robert I. Fitzhenry and Cecil L. Whiteside
- Country of origin: Canada
- Headquarters location: Leaside, Ontario; Toronto, Ontario
- Distribution: self-distributed (Canada); Firefly Books Ltd (distributing for United States)
- Publication types: Books
- Imprints: Red Deer Press; Fifth House Books; Whitecap Books
- Official website: www.fitzhenry.ca

Fitzhenry & Whiteside, nicknamed Fitz & Witz, is a Canadian book publishing and distribution company, located in Leaside, Ontario. It publishes trade titles in children's and young adult fiction, textbooks, reference, history, biography, photography, sports and poetry.

Authors published with Fitzhenry & Whiteside include Bernice Thurman Hunter (The Girls They Left Behind; Red Maple Award shortlist 2007), Ian Krykorka and Kari-Lynn Winters (Gift Days, Buzz about Bees).

In 2025, Fitzhenry & Whiteside was acquired by Ken Whyte's Sutherland House.

== History ==
The company was founded in 1966 by two former employees of other publishing houses: Robert I. Fitzhenry and Cecil L. Whiteside. It began as a distributor in Canada for American publishers such as Harper & Row and Henry Holt and Company, then started publishing reference works and nonfiction. Their lineup still includes such titles as The Fitzhenry and Whiteside Book of Canadian Facts and Dates. In the 1990s and 2000s, the company bought several other Canadian publishers, including Fifth House, Trifolium Books, Stoddart Kids, Red Deer Press, and Whitecap Books expanding their repertoire to include children's fiction, science fiction, and cookbooks. By 1996, Fitzhenry and Whiteside had retired from the company, which was inherited by the Fitzhenry family.

== Awards ==
Six Fitzhenry & Whiteside titles have won Governor General's Literary Awards:

1. Northrop Frye on Shakespeare by Northrop Frye in 1986
2. A Screaming Kind of Day by Rachna Gilmore in 1999
3. Processional by Anne Compton in 2005
4. Greener Grass: The Famine Years by Caroline Pignat in 2009
5. The Gospel Truth by Caroline Pignat in 2015
6. A World We Have Lost by Bill Waiser in 2016

In addition, the company's books and authors have been finalists for the Governor General's Award, and have collected many other awards over the years.

== Fifth House division ==
Fifth House is a Canadian book publishing company, located in Leaside, Ontario, and a subsidiary of Fitzhenry & Whiteside. It publishes trade titles in history, native studies, photography, science & nature, and social science.

Fifth House has won Alberta Publisher of the Year two years running in 2007 and 2008.

Fifth House books have won many Saskatchewan and Alberta Book prizes and awards from the Canadian Authors Association as well as two gold awards from Cuisine Canada for High Plains: The Joy of Alberta Cuisine by Cinda Chavich.

Two titles, Lisa Christensen's A Hiker’s Guide to Art in the Canadian Rockies and Brian Brennan’s Scoundrels & Scallywags, have been shortlisted for the Grant MacEwan Literary Award, and in 2004 Brennan became the first recipient of the Dave Greber Award for freelance writing for Romancing the Rockies.
