= We Know the Truth: Stories to Inspire Reconciliation =

Canadian television documentary film

We Know the Truth: Stories to Inspire Reconciliation is a Canadian television documentary film, which was broadcast by CBC Television on September 30, 2021, to mark the National Day of Truth and Reconciliation. Hosted by Stephanie Cram of CBC Manitoba, the film profiles several survivors of the Indian residential school system, including Ernie Daniels, an activist who is working to convert the former residential school in Portage la Prairie, Manitoba into a national museum about the history of the residential schools.

The film was a nominee for the Donald Brittain Award at the 10th Canadian Screen Awards in 2022.
