= Alice Priestley =

Canadian children's writer and illustrator

- Born: 1962 (age 63–64); Toronto, Ontario, Canada
- Education: University of Toronto
- Occupation: Children's writer / illustrator
- Website: alicepriestley.com

Alice Priestley (born 1962 in Toronto) is a Canadian children's writer and illustrator. She has illustrated or written books published by Annick Press, Key Porter Books, and Second Story Press.

Priestley studied fine art and English at the University of Toronto. She lives in Toronto with her family.

== Works ==
=== Illustrator ===
- Nelson, Jenny (1991). Jessica and the Lost Stories. Toronto: Macmillan Canada. ISBN 978-0-7715-6953-1.
- Cumming, Peter (1993). Out on the Ice in the Middle of the Bay. Annick Press. ISBN 978-1-55037-870-2.
- Silsbe, Brenda (1994). Winning the Girl of the Sea. Annick Press. ISBN 978-1-550-37312-7.
- Gilmore, Rachna (1994). Lights for Gita. Gardiner, Me: Tilbury House. ISBN 978-0-88448-150-8.
- Silbe, Brenda (1995). The Watcher. Toronto: Annick Press. ISBN 978-1-55037-385-1.
- Smith-Ayala, Emilie (1996). Clouds on the Mountain. Annick Press. ISBN 978-1-550-37472-8.
- Gilmore, Rachna (1996). Roses for Gita. Gardiner, ME: Second Story Press. ISBN 978-0-929-00585-0.
- Gilmore, Rachna (2002). A Gift for Gita. Gardiner, ME: Tilbury House. ISBN 978-0-88448-239-0.
- Strauss, Anna (2002). Hush, Mama loves you. New York: Walker. ISBN 978-0-8027-8806-1.
- Setterington, Ken (2005). Mom and Mum are Getting Married!. Semiotext(e). ISBN 1-896764-84-3.
- Coates, Jan (1999). Rainbows in the Dark. Second Story Press. ISBN 978-1-896-76495-5.
- Hutchins, Hazel (2009). Together. Annick Press. ISBN 978-1-55451-208-9.
- Setterington, Ken (2020). Mom Marries Mum!. Second Story Press.
- Hazzard, N. M. L. (2024). Tizzy and Me: Fifteen Ways to Love a Mink. Red Deer Press. ISBN 978-0-889-95750-3.
- Levine, Karen; Baslaw, Sheila (2024). The Light Keeper. Second Story Press. ISBN 978-1-772-60388-0.

=== Author and illustrator ===
- Someone is Reading This Book. Annick Press. 1998. ISBN 1-55037-448-6.
