= Kari-Lynn Winters =

Canadian children's author

- Born: 1969 (age 56–57)
- Occupation: Author, university professor
- Genre: Children's literature

Kari-Lynn Winters, née Moore (born 1969) is a Canadian children's author, playwright, drama educator, and literacy professor. She taught children's literacy, literature, dance and drama education at the University of British Columbia from 2004 to 2009. In 2010, Winters became an assistant professor in the Faculty of Education at Brock University (Ontario) and co-editor of Teaching and Learning. She advanced to associate professor in 2014, and to full professor in 2021.

== Early life and education ==
Winters was born in St. Thomas, Ontario. She holds a teaching degree from the University of Toronto, in regular and special education for children ages 3–13. She is also a graduate of the National Theatre School of Canada, where she earned a certificate in technical theatre. Her master's thesis "Developing an Arts-Integrated Narrative Reading Comprehension Program for Less Proficient Grade 3 and 4 Students," on exploring the efficacy of using the arts to strengthen less proficient students' reading comprehension, was selected as best Master's Thesis in Literacy in Canada, 2005. Winters completed her PhD from the University of British Columbia in 2009 with a dissertation entitled "Authorship as Assemblage: Multimodal Literacies of Play, Literature, and Drama." Her dramatic work included writing scripts for and performing with Vancouver's theatre-for-literacy troupes Carousel Theatre and Tickle Trunk Players.

== Career ==
Winters has published numerous children's books, children's non-fiction articles, and academic articles, and has herself won multiple Excellence in Teaching awards and won the St. Catharines Arts Awards 2016 "Emerging Artist Award" and the St. Catharines Arts Educator Award in 2020.

Winters says she didn't always consider herself a writer; many of her elementary school years were spent either resisting composition or struggling to write. Her current work explores how she came to appreciate storytelling and children's literature and eventually became a writer herself, and ways to effect a similar transformation in her students. Winters has been featured in radio and newspaper interviews and her academic work has been cited by other literacy researchers.

From 2010 to 2012 Winters expanded her work to educational activism, from organizing an annual "Arts Matters" educational conference to raising funds for girls' education in Africa. Proceeds from her book Gift Days are being used to support the charity Because I am a Girl, a movement to "unleash" the power of girls and women in the developing world through education and women's rights; at its book launch in November 2012, enough money was raised to send 10 girls to school in Uganda for a year. Her advocacy for arts research and arts-based practices continued throughout the Covid pandemic, including creating a play and film for "What’s Art Got to Do With It? The role of arts and culture in a community’s survival during a global pandemic."

By 2020 she had twenty-nine books published or press.

== Books (selected) ==
- Jeffrey and Sloth (Orca Book Publishers, 2007)
- When Chickens Fly (Gumboot Books, 2009)
- On My Walk (Tradewind Books, 2009)
- On My Swim (Tradewind Books, 2018)
- On My Bike (Tradewind Books, 2017)
- On My Skis (Tradewind Books, 2016)
- Runaway Alphabet (Simply Read Books, 2010)
- aRHYTHMetic: A book and a half of poetry about math, by K. Winters, T. Stone, and L. Sherritt-Fleming, ill by S. Ritchie (Gumboot Books, 2009; Tickle Trunk Publications, 2011)
- aRYTHMétique, adapted by Christine Jutras-Tarakdjian (Gumboot, 2009; Tickle Trunk Publications, 2011)
- Gift Days (Fitzhenry & Whiteside, 2012)
- Buzz about Bees (Fitzhenry & Whiteside, 2013)
- Stinky Skunk Mel (Simply Read Books, 2014)
- No-Matter-What Friend (Tradewind Books, 2014)
- Hungry for Math: Poems to Munch On (Fitzhenry & Whiteside, 2014)
- Bite into Bloodsuckers (Fitzhenry & Whiteside, 2015)
- Bad Pirate (Pajama Press, 2015)
- Good Pirate (Pajama Press, 2016)
- French Toast (Pajama Press, 2016)
- Let's Play a Hockey Game (Scholastic, 2016)
- Hungry for Science: Poems to Crunch On (Fitzhenry & Whiteside, 2018)
- Hungry for The Arts: Poems to Chomp On (Fitzhenry & Whiteside, 2021)
- On the Line (Pajama Press, 2021)
- Just Bea (Tradewind Books, 2022)

== Anthology contributions ==
- "Rumors," in Stephen Rogers (ed.), My First Year in the Classroom: 50 Stories That Celebrate the Good, the Bad, and the Most Unforgettable Moments (Cincinnati: Adams Media, 2009)
- "Rhyme or Reason," ill. by S. Ritchie, in World of Stories (Gumboot Books, 2008)

POETRY

- "A Scientist Lives in Our Kitchen." Know Magazine, 9 (May/June, 2007), p. 18.

== Journal articles (selected) ==
- Winters, K. et al. (2017). "A Reason to Respond: Finding Agency Through the Arts." International Journal of Education & the Arts 18:25.
- Winters, Kari-Lynn, Griffin, S. (2014). "Singing is a Celebration of Language: Using Music to Enhance Young Children’s Vocabularies." Language and Literacy, 16(3), 78–91.
- Wager, A. & Winters, K. (2012). "Expanding Educators’ Awareness of Youth Homelessness through Critical Dramatic Inquiry." In Teaching and Learning 7(3).
- Winters, K. et al. (2010). "From image to ideology: analysing shifting identity positions of marginalized youth across the cultural sites of video production" In Pedagogies: An International Journal, 5(4), 298–312.
  - This article was later selected among Pedagogies 10th anniversary "Top Articles."
- Winters, K. (2010). "Quilts of authorship: A literature review of multimodal assemblage in the field of literacy education." In Canadian Journal for New Scholars in Education, 3(1).
- Winters, Kari-Lynn, Belliveau, George, & Sherritt-Fleming, Lori. (Spring, 2009). "Shifting identities, literacy, and a/r/t/ography: Exploring an educational theatre company." Language and Literacy, 11(1).
- Rogers, Theresa, Winters, Kari-Lynn, Bryan, G., Price, J., McCormick, F., House, L., Mezzarobba, D., & Sinclaire, C. (March, 2009). "Developing the IRIS: Toward Situated and Valid Assessment Measures in Collaborative Professional Development and School Reform in Literacy." The Reading Teacher, 59(6), 544–553.
- Winters, K. "Letting Arnold Lobel Pack My Luggage". (Spring 2006) The Dragon Lode: Journal of the Children's Literature and Reading Special Interest Group, International Reading Association, 24(2) 46–50.

== Children's non-fiction articles (selected) ==
- "Honey, I Shrunk My Liver." Know Magazine, 6 (Nov/Dec 2006), p. 4.
- "Monkeying Around with Perfume." Know Magazine, 9 (May/June, 2007), p. 3.
- "Measure Me A Measurement." Know Magazine, 11 (September/October, 2007), p. 18.
- "Colorful Mistakes." Fandangle Magazine for Children, (September, 2007).

== Children's fiction articles (selected) ==
- "Jeffrey's Wor(l)ds Meet Sloth," illustrated by Oana Capota. Chameleon Magazine, 2:1, 24-28 (2004).
- "Esper's Dream," illustrated by Tami Thirlwell. Chameleon Magazine, 3:1, 24-28 (2006).
- "Extreme Rollers." ChickaDEE Magazine, (January, 2008)
- "The Mightiest of All." Know Magazine, ( January, 2008)

== Academic books ==
- Winters, K. (2010). Beyond Words: Using the Arts to Enhance Early Reading Comprehension. Birmingham, AL: Look Again Press. Available online.
- Rogers, T., Winters, K., Perry, M., & LaMonde, A. (2014). Youth, Critical Literacies, and Civic Engagement: Arts, Media, and Literacy in the Lives of Adolescents. New York: Routledge.

== Academic book articles (selected) ==
- Winters, K. Rogers, T., Schofield, A (2006). "The Antigone Project: Exploring the Imaginative, Active, and Social Dimensions of Drama, Print Literacy, and Media." In Crumpler T., Schneider, J., and Rogers, T. (eds.). Process Drama: an Educational Tool for Developing Multiple Literacies. Portsmouth, NH: Heinemann.
- Winters, K. and Rogers, T. (2010). "Textual Play, Satire, and Counter Discourses of Street Youth Zining Practices." In Alvermann, D. (ed.) Adolescents' Online Literacies: Connecting Classrooms, Digital Media, and Popular Culture (New Literacies and Digital Epistemologies), pp. 91–108. New York: Peter Lang Publishing.

== Conference papers cited in third-party publications ==
- Rogers, T. and Winters, K. (2008). "Within 14 blocks: Zining with street youth in the YouthCLAIM project." Presented at the National Reading Conference. Orlando, FL.
- Rogers, T., Winters, K., Perry, M., & LaMonde, A. (2009). "The YouthCLAIM project: Researching critical literacies and arts-integrated media production among youth in classroom and community sites." Presented at the annual meeting of American Educational Research Association. San Diego, CA.
