= The Song Within My Heart =

Children's picture book by David Bouchard

- Author: David Bouchard
- Illustrator: Allen Sapp
- Language: English
- Subject: coming of age in a Cree household
- Genre: children's picture book
- Publication place: Canada

The Song within my Heart by Dave Bouchard is a children's picture book by David Bouchard with illustrations by Allen Sapp. It was first published in 2002 by Raincoast Books. A story about a young Cree boy, it is based on the memories of the illustrator as told to the author. Allen Sapp received a Governor General's Award for the illustrations in 2003.

== Plot summary ==
A young boy grows up in an average Cree household but has a very special bond with his grandmother. She takes her heritage very seriously and wants to pass the traditions and knowledge down unto her grandson. By doing so, she takes him to his first pow-wow. Through this cultural experience, he learns new things about his ancestry and does so by ways before he could not imagine. For instance, the people who play the drums at this pow-wow share their story through the rhythm and the beats of their drum. Not only does this young boy learn more about his heritage, he learns to look at things in a different perspective and realizes that his family history is all around him.

== The author ==
Author David Bouchard is a Canadian Metis author and has written over fifty works of literature for all ages. Bourchard is also a school teacher and principal, and travels the country speaking on the history of First Nations.

== Canadian Identity ==
David Bouchard reflects the Canadian Identity by travelling several countries and speaks about his language as a Metis. This represents Canadian Identity because he is sharing to multiple people one of Canada's main identity, the Metis language.

== The illustrator ==
The renowned Aboriginal artist, Dr. Allen Sapp, was raised on the Red Pheasant Reserve in Saskatchewan by his grandparents during the 1930s. The Canada Council for the Arts press release concerning the Governor-General's Award said: "With narrative paintings of beautiful simplicity, Allen Sapp creates a work of transcendent dignity, powerfully confirming the ties that connect the generations."
