= Imagine a Day =

2005 children's book by Sarah L. Thomson

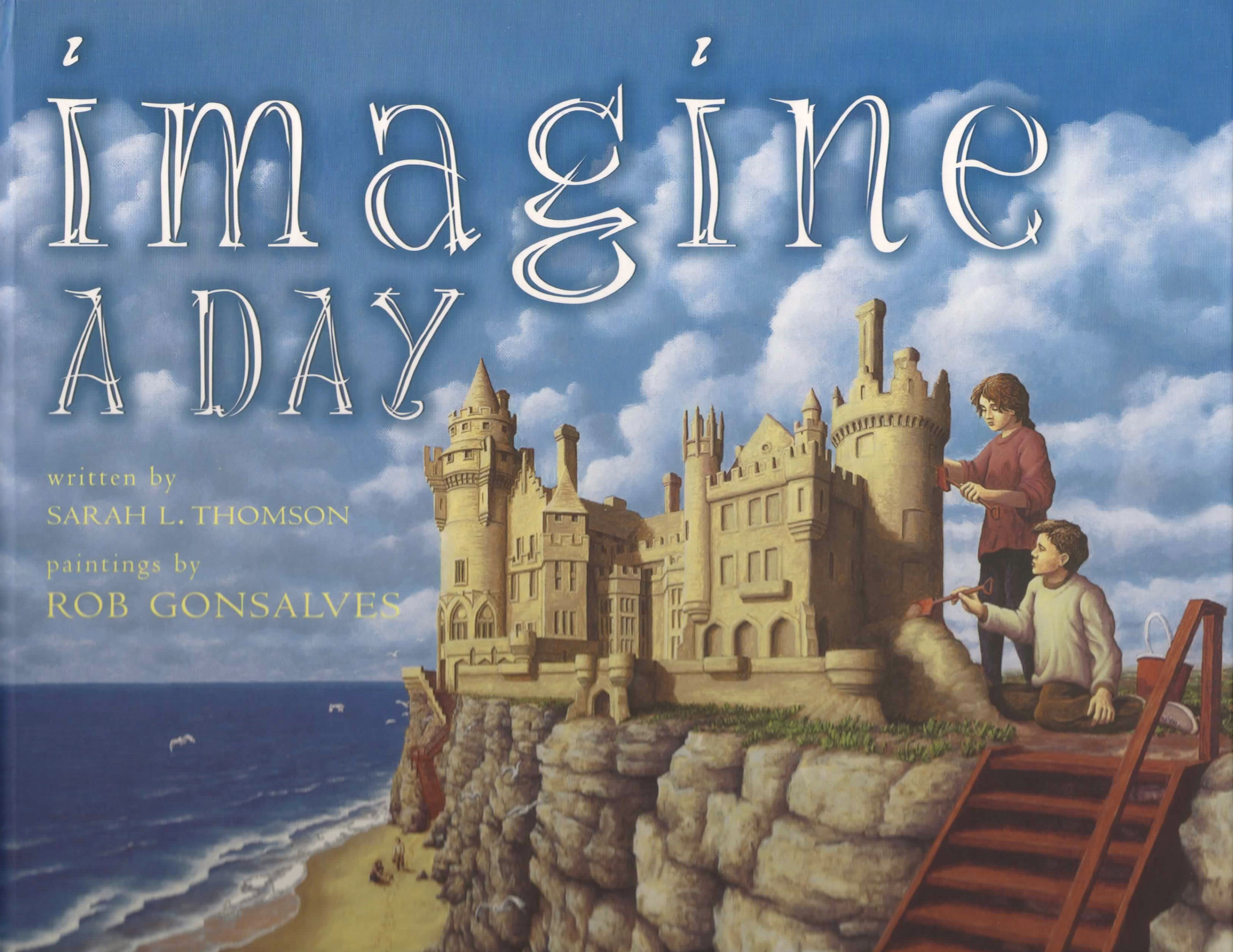
- Front cover of the book
- Author: Written by Sarah L. Thomson, Paintings by Rob Gonsalves
- Language: English
- Publisher: New York: Atheneum Books for Young Readers
- Publication date: 25 January 2005
- Publication place: United States
- Pages: 40 pages
- ISBN: 9780689852190

Imagine a Day is a children's picture book created by painter Rob Gonsalves, and writer Sarah L. Thomson. This book is the second book in companion to two other children's literature books, which also have a collection of Gonsalves paintings.

Imagine a Day is the second book in the "Imagine a..." book series, with Imagine a Night being the first to be published in 2003, followed by Imagine a Day published in 2005, Imagine a Place published in 2008, and most recently Imagine a World published in 2015.

Imagine a Day has received great attention due to Gonsalves' marvelous abstract work. Together each page unites a unique painting of imagination, with Thomson's poetic style of short phrases, creating a dream beyond ordinary horizons. This style promotes more engagement in the story and encourages the reader to think differently about their surroundings, and to be inspired creatively. Gonsalves strongly believed in the importance of imagination. He claims that one of his favorite quotes from Einstein, which says "imagination is more important than knowledge," was the key motivation to this work.

== Plot ==
This work of art contains paintings of great imagination that sometimes plays tricks on the eyes. It encourages the reader to think outside of the box and to make connotations to the world we live in. The book includes references to nature and all different things that one can imagine themselves doing. In addition to its literal meaning, the words aid to invoke ideas or feelings for the reader, by introducing phrases such as "when you don't need wings to soar" and "when everything you build touches the sky" to help create peculiar dreams of what life could be like.

The powerful symbolism of the book works in unison with paintings and text to create deeper meaning. It symbolizes objects as more than just its arbitrary symbol, as the quotation "when a tree is a ladder between earth and air" presents the tree as not just a piece of wood, with bark and branches growing from the ground, but as something to be recognized in a different fashion-as a ladder. By drawing on the tree’s connections with the earth and air, it also portrays the beauty of nature, and how to appreciate it.

The publisher states on the inside cover of the book, that Rob Gonsalves "stretches the limits of visual exploration with his breathtaking paintings and encourages parents and children alike to look beyond the limits of the everyday world and imagine."

Gonsalves provides images to his readers to worship imagination, as it can be very powerful. Thomson draws attention to this on the second last page, by depicting the Cathedral as the powerful symbol needed to see beyond the surface of true meaning.

Although the connections to symbolism in the book may seem to be too complex for children to unravel, it is the purpose of imagination that Gonsalves and Thomson are stressing. The significant outcome to be acknowledged is how imagination has no limits, and how it makes the child feel while being taken to another world in their mind.

== Awards ==
In 2005, Imagine a Day won the Governor General's Award for English-language children's illustration, which had been presented to Gonsalves by the Governor General of Canada.

Sarah L. Thomson has also won many awards for the books she has published on her own.
