= Amelia and Me =

2013 children's fiction novel by Heather Stemp

- Author: Heather Stemp
- Cover artist: Graham Blair
- Language: English
- Genre: Realistic fiction
- Set in: Harbour Grace, Newfoundland
- Publisher: Flanker Press
- Publication date: 13 August 2013
- Publication place: Canada
- Media type: Paperback, ebook
- Pages: 210
- ISBN: 978-1-77117-254-7

Amelia and Me is a 2013 children's fiction novel by Heather Stemp. The book is edited by Paul Butler. A photo gallery and glossary are included in the end of the paperback edition. The novel was originally written to record the author's family history. The setting and characters are non-fictional, with Ginny Ross, the main character, being the author's aunt. Amelia and Me was shortlisted for the 2014/15 Red Cedar Book Award, and is in the Canadian Children's Book Centre's Best Books for Kids & Teens Spring 2014 Selection.

== Characters ==
- Virginia (Ginny) Ross: A brave, determined, and smart twelve-year-old girl who wants to be an aviator.
- Joseph (Joe) Ross (Papa): Ginny's grandfather who supports her dreams, runs a grocery store.
- Renie Ross: Ginny's mother, stubborn while loving, believes planes are for men, and wants Ginny to be a polite, well-dressed lady.
- Uncle Harry: Mechanic and airport supervisor, supports Ginny's dreams and teaches her and Jennie Mae lessons on aviation and automobiles.
- Amelia Earhart
- Aunt Rose: Ginny's friendly and understanding aunt who tends for the Archibald Hotel.
- Llewellyn (Llew) Crane: A fifteen-year-old boy who works in Papa's store.
- Jennie Mae Stevenson: Ginny's best friend
- Ginny's father: Worked in Toronto and had a drinking problem.
- Elizabeth Harris: A kind lady about the age of Ginny's mom, whose husband recently died, assisted Ginny on her trip to Boston.
- Nana Ross: Ginny's grandmother
- Billy Ross: Ginny's six-year-old brother

== Plot ==
It was August 1931, during the Great Depression. Ginny Ross, her cousin Pat Cron, and her best friend Jennie Mae Stevenson sneaked out to watch the takeoff of City of New York. However, the plane crashed, and Ginny was caught.

Two days later, Jennie Mae, Llewellyn and Ginny went to search for the plane's owner's dog. They received the reward of a hundred dollars. Ginny let her papa take most of her share to pay for the store's next shipment. Ginny's mom forcefully took the rest for sewing supplies. Later that night, Ginny wrote a letter to Amelia Earhart explaining her situation.

One day, Ginny and Jennie Mae decided to make a model of a plane's cockpit with paint and a wooden crate. After nearly two weeks, the model cockpit was completed, and Uncle Harry agreed to teach the girls the basics of aviation.

Four weeks later, Ginny received a reply from Amelia Earhart. She went to tell her papa, but found him sleeping. She tried to wake him, but instead, he slipped off the chair. The doctor came, but it was too late. Papa had died.

Five months have passed since papa's funeral. Ginny's dad had replaced papa in running the store. While the kettle boiled, Ginny read Amelia's letter again. When the kettle whistled, Ginny left the letter on the table. Her mom picked it up and ripped it, then threw it into the stove. Ginny was told she will quit school and work full-time to keep the family together.

Early in the morning, Ginny packed and wrote a letter to Amelia. She borrowed money from Llewellyn and carried it along with the reward money she snuck back from her mom. She went on the train to Port aux Basques. On the train, Ginny met papa's ghost. Papa encouraged her to think some more, and told her she will never be alone.

Ginny also met Elizabeth Harris, a friendly woman whose husband recently died. Elizabeth told Ginny she could stay at her house while waiting for the ferry. Ginny felt guilty of lies, and confessed to Elizabeth that she was going to see Amelia Earhart. Later, she met papa again, and told him about her decision. Papa smiled and said he was proud of her.

Ginny boarded the ferry early on the seventh day after the train arrived at Port aux Basques. After the ferry arrived at North Sydney, she took the train to Boston. She asked the information desk lady for directions to Amelia's address, but got robbed on the way—the lady had given her the wrong directions.

On the way to Amelia's house, Ginny saw her other grandparents'—Mom and Pop Davis's—house. When she rang the bell, Mom Davis opened it and locked her in the bedroom. Ginny used the bedspread to escape.

When Ginny arrived at Amelia's house, a lady told her Amelia has not been there for months, and gave her directions to Rye, New York. Ginny, robbed of her money, went to the information lady at the train station for help. The lady helped her sneak onto the train to New York City.

In New York City, Ginny asked for directions to Rye, New York. With a map but without money, she had no choice but to walk. She walked for a few hours and slept in a culvert under the road. The next morning, an old lady with a chubby cat noticed Ginny and offered her a ride. Ginny arrived at Rye at two in the afternoon.

After a long time of walking in the rain, Ginny finally arrived at Amelia's house. After a bath and clean clothes, she told Amelia her story. Amelia told her that quitting school would only delay her plans, not end them, and promised to be in touch soon.

Ginny returned home to find her Nana having a nervous breakdown, her mom at her wit's end, and Billy crying and stealing. However, the atmosphere changed the next morning.

Five days later, Uncle Harry announced the season's next flight. On May 20, Bernt Balchen, Ed Gorski, and a third person would fly to Harbour Grace. Neither the name of the third person nor the final destination was announced. Ginny realized the secret person was Amelia Earhart. On the day of Amelia's arrival, Ginny was locked in her bedroom by her mom, but was saved with the keys by Billy.

A while after meeting Amelia again, Ginny found her mom bursting into the hotel. Amelia convinced Ginny's mom that Ginny was capable of becoming a pilot.

After Amelia departed for her solo transatlantic flight, Ginny anxiously waited for news. The next morning, Uncle Harry announced Amelia's successful landing in Paris. Ginny went to talk to her mom at the store. Her dad found unopened crates of supplies, and the store was in business again. Ginny confessed that she is not the kind of daughter her mom wants, but she will make money by flying and send it home. Her mom said she did not want to lose her, not her help.

The Ross family faced every day as it came. Billy began to help at the store. Ginny was taught by her teacher three evenings a week, and was learning faster than Pat and Jennie Mae. She wrote to Elizabeth regularly, and her mom's lecturing and hitting have stopped. Amelia wrote a letter saying she was searching for ways to involve women in aviation, and wanted to partner with a school. Ginny showed the letter to her mom, and she smiled and said she may be proud of her someday.

== Reception ==
Amelia and Me has received editorial reviews from The Telegram, Edwards Book Club, CM Magazine, Resource Links, and Canadian Children's Book News. The Telegram praised the background as "rich" and "solid", and Ginny Ross as a "great protagonist" that "brings gumption and momentum to the narrative". However, the Telegram commented that there is "something odd about this fusion of the speculative and actual". Edwards Book Club commented that the "frank and unsentimental portraits of hardship and forbearance ring especially true". CM Magazine wrote that Amelia and Me will "interest girls and women". Resource Links praised that the "description of life in Harbour Grace in the 1930s rings true in every detail". Canadian Children's Book News wrote that "this charming historical novel gives girls a spirited and likeable heroine".
