= Rob Gonsalves =

Canadian painter (1959–2017)

- Gonsalves, c. 2010–2017
- Born: July 10, 1959; Toronto, Ontario, Canada
- Died: June 14, 2017 (aged 57) near Brockville, Ontario, Canada
- Education: Ryerson University, OCAD
- Style: Magic Realism
- Awards: Governor General's Award for English-language children's illustration 2005 Imagine a Day
- Website: www.robgonsalves.live

Robert "Rob" Gonsalves (July 10, 1959 – June 14, 2017) was a Canadian painter of magic realism (surrealism). He produced original works, limited edition prints and illustrations for his own books.

His "Imagine a..." book series is widely celebrated in Canadian children's literature and education.

== Early life ==
Gonsalves was born in Toronto, Ontario, and was of Portuguese descent. As a teenager, he was inspired by Progressive Rock album cover art of groups like Genesis, Yes, and Gentle Giant. Their fantasy and surrealism sparked his artistic direction. His love of the urban environment and Victorian architecture found its way into his paintings. He studied Architecture at Ryerson Technical University and learned how to manipulate perspective. This became an important element in the narrative of his paintings.

He attended the Ontario College of Art and Design for a year.

== Career ==
In his post college years, Gonsalves worked full-time as an architect, also painting trompe-l'œil murals and theatre sets. After an enthusiastic response in 1990 at the Toronto Outdoor Art Exhibition, Gonsalves devoted himself to painting full-time.

Although Gonsalves' work is often categorized as surrealistic, it differs because the images are deliberately planned and result from conscious thought. Ideas are largely generated by the external world and involve recognizable human activities, using carefully planned illusionist devices. Gonsalves injects a sense of magic into realistic scenes. As a result, the term "Magic Realism" describes his work accurately. His work is an attempt to represent human beings' desire to believe the impossible, to be open to possibility.

Gonsalves exhibited at Art Expo New York and Los Angeles, Decor Atlanta and Las Vegas, Fine Art Forum, as well as one-man shows at Huckleberry Fine Art, Marcus Ashley Gallery in South Lake Tahoe, Hudson River Art Gallery, Saper Galleries (November 7 to December 31, 2004), Discovery Galleries, Ltd., and Kaleidoscope Gallery. Huckleberry Fine Art published the 1st limited edition prints which remains incomplete because of Gonsalves's death.

In June 2003, Simon & Schuster introduced North America and Canada to Imagine a Night, Gonsalves' first hardcover book featuring sixteen paintings. Due to the success of Imagine a Night, Simon & Schuster released a second book by Gonsalves, Imagine A Day, in 2004 for which he won the 2005 Governor General's Award in the Children's Literature – Illustration category.

His book Imagine a Place was released in 2008. He released another book, Imagine a World, in September 2015.

The website RobGonsalves.live was created in 2019 and is dedicated to keeping his legacy alive. Posters and eventually, new posthumous limited edition prints will become available.

== Art style and inspirations ==
Some commentators have compared Gonsalves's surrealistic style to that of Salvador Dalí or René Magritte.

Gonsalves had an incredibly distinctive and unique surrealist painting style. His paintings typically depict two scenes with visually similar features that gradually fade into each other. His piece Light Flurries (2010), for example, shows an evening view of Manhattan on one side and a snowing pine tree forest on the other; with the buildings gradually becoming the pines and their window lights becoming the snowfall. In another of his works titled Lighthouse (Candlepower) (1997), candles lit by a child and placed over rocks on a lake gradually become lighthouses.

Gonsalves' painting Water Dancing (2011) was inspired by a walk through a forest, where he was struck by the visuals of a river of water cascading over a cliff and into a pool below.

One of his most popular artworks is the piece The Sun Sets Sail (2001). The piece, backdropped by a yellow sunset, depicts a large bridge over a body of water slowly morphing into a line of full-rigged Tall Ships.

== Death and legacy ==
Gonsalves suffered from mental illness and died by suicide on June 14, 2017. His official Facebook page stated in part "Rob Gonsalves battled the dark but succumbed June 14th."

Fellow artist and widow, Lise Carruthers organized an effort to preserve his legacy in 2018. In 2019, a 4-foot-high black granite plinth was installed on his gravesite at the Necropolis Cemetery in Toronto Canada. Each side of the pedestal featured a different porcelain reproduction of a Gonsalves painting.

Gonsalves' "Imagine a..." book series is widely remembered as staple in Canadian school libraries and elementary classrooms, particularly throughout the 2000s and 2010s.

== In popular culture ==
In 2018, Ariana Grande released a music video for her song 'God is a Woman' in which one scene references Gonsalves' painting Water Dancing.
