= Northwest Passage (children's book) =

2013 picture book by Matthew James

- Author: Matthew James, based on the song by Stan Rogers
- Illustrator: Matthew James
- Cover artist: Michael Solomon
- Language: English
- Subject: Northwest Passage song
- Genre: Sea story
- Published: 2013 Groundwood Books
- Publication place: Canada
- Media type: Children's picture book
- Pages: 50
- ISBN: 978-1-55498-153-3

Northwest Passage is a book based upon the famous Canadian song "Northwest Passage". The song is a story of a man's travel through the arctic of Canada while following famed explorers like Alexander Mackenzie, David Thompson, John Franklin, and Henry Kelsey. The book is written and narrated by Matthew James, who is a Canadian musician, illustrator, and author and has been nominated for, and won, the Governor General's Award for children's literature. The book is full of unique illustrations, also done by Matt James, showing the story as it is mentioned in the song. It also includes a timeline of Canadian exploration, miniature biographies on explorers of the Northwest Passage, and portraits of major explorers.

== Plot ==
A book based on the well-known song "Northwest Passage" first sung by Stan Rogers in 1981, Northwest Passage tells a tale about the song and the facts behind it. The basis of the song and story is the fateful sea voyage made by John Franklin in 1845, which led to both his ships and his entire crew, as well as his life being lost.

=== Song ===
The song the book is based on, "Northwest Passage", includes many lyrics, including the chorus - based greatly of John Franklin's expedition - and a final verse that was never recorded. The song is considered one of the best Canadian songs ever, and the fourth best Canadian song of 2005.

The chorus of the song is:

Ah for just one time I would take the Northwest Passage,
To find the hand of Franklin reaching for the Beaufort Sea,
Tracing one warm line through a land so wild and savage,
And make a Northwest Passage to the sea.

=== Narration ===
The narration, done by Matt James, focuses on the fateful story, and facts about, John Franklin's disastrous journey. Matt James tells facts and details about the song. The narration includes a well-described story of the mystery surrounding the disappearance of John Franklin, who is described as brave, but not brilliant.
