= Bella's Tree =

Illustrated children's book

- First edition cover
- Author: Janet Russell
- Illustrator: Jirina Marton
- Published: 2009 Groundwood Books
- Publication place: Canada
- Media type: Print (hardcover)
- Pages: 40
- ISBN: 978-0-88899-870-5

Bella's Tree is an illustrated children's book written by Janet Russell, with illustrations by Jirina Marton. It was published in 2009 in Canada by Groundwood Books. In 2009, Bella's Tree was awarded the Governor General's Literary Award for Children's Literature—Illustrations.

== Plot summary ==
Bella's grandmother, Nan, is "crooked". All the berries she wished she had picked are now covered with snow. And on top of that, it is nearly Christmas and she has not gotten a Christmas tree. Bella asks Nan if she can cut down a tree for them, but Nan does not believe a little "slip of a thing" could handle an axe. After Bella proves that she is "big and strong and smart and well coordinated," Nan gives her the axe. Bella and her large dog Bruno set out to fetch a Christmas tree. The first tree they find is an alder tree. Bella asks the junco sitting in the tree if she might have the tree for her Nan for Christmas. The junco agrees as long as it can come sing in the tree on Christmas Day. When Bella brings the tree home, Nan tells her that it is not the right kind of tree. They decorate it anyway, and Nan teaches Bella a song to remind her to look for an evergreen tree.

The next day, Bella and Bruno set out to find an evergreen tree. Bella finds a spruce tree, promising the chickadee sitting in that it may come sing in the tree on Christmas Day. Once Nan finishes telling Bella that a spruce tree is not a Christmas tree, they set it next to the alder bush and decorate it. Nan teaches Bella another song to help her find a Christmas tree.

In the morning, Bella and Bruno set out once again in search of a Christmas tree. They bring home a pine tree, having promised the pine grosbeaks that they are welcome to sing in the tree on Christmas Day. Nan is still disheartened. In her opinion, Pine trees are not Christmas trees. They put the remaining ornaments on the pine tree. Nan is too sad to give Bella another song. She tells Bella to give up because it is the night before Christmas and it is too late to get a tree now. The decorations have all been used. Bella begs for another chance and another song, but Nan refuses.

Then Bruno, seeing Nan's sadness, pulls Bella back over the snow-covered hills and through the woods until they reach a fir tree full of cedar waxwings. Bella knows that this is the perfect Christmas tree, and she brings it home, agreeing to the waxwings' condition that they be allowed to come sing in the tree in the morning. When she gets home late that night, Bella sets the tree up next to the others.

In the morning, Nan is overjoyed to see the fir tree, and the junco, chickadee, and grosbeaks all fly to their trees ready to sing. Nan's smile "started to slack a slip" when she realized that they used up all the decorations on undeserving trees, but then fifty cedar waxwings flock to the fir tree and begin to sing, with the rest of the birds joining in. Nan is crooked no longer.

== Songs ==
=== Evergreen Song ===
to the tune of "Miss Mary Mack":
All trees have leaves,
But some leaves leave
Their trees in fall
On the ground to sprawl.

All trees have leaves,
But the leaves that leave
From deciduous trees
Can pile up to your knees.

All trees have leaves,
But some don't leave;
No, they don't go never,
They're evergreen forever.

=== Spruce Tree Song ===
to the tune of "This Old Man":
This old spruce, he had needles,
And all those needles had four sides each.
With a spin, twirl, give a whirl, in your finger, girl;
All day long that spruce needle twirl.

This old spruce, he had cones,
And all those cones they did hang down.
With a spin, twirl, give a whirl, in your finger, girl;
All day long that spruce needle twirl.

== About the Author ==
Janet Russell was inspired to write this book by her husband's mother, who really did love to pick berries, was never crooked, often enchanting and always exceedingly practical; by her daughter Antonia; and by the late Bruno, the biggest dog that ever lived. Janet is a seabird biologist as well as the publisher and audiobook producer of Rattling Books. This is her first book. She lives in Tors Cove, Newfoundland.

== About the Illustrator ==
Jirina Marton is originally from Prague, and she lived in Paris for many years before coming to Canada. She has exhibited her paintings throughout Europe, Canada, and Japan. She is the illustrator of many children's books, including Little Book of Northern Tales: The Bear Say North by Bob Barton, Arctic Adventures: Tales from the Lives of Inuit Artists by Raquel Rivera, and Marja's Skis by Jean E. Pendziwol, which was a Governor General's Award finalist for illustration. She lives in Colborne, Ontario.
