= The Chronicles of Faerie =

The Chronicles of Faerie is a young adult fantasy series by O.R. Melling. It consists of four books: The Hunter's Moon (1993), The Summer King (1990), The Light-Bearer's Daughter (2001), and The Book of Dreams (2003).
