= The Hunter's Moon (novel) =

1993 novel by O. R. Melling

- Author: O. R. Melling
- Language: English
- Series: Chronicles of Faerie
- Genre: Fantasy
- Publisher: Amulet Books
- Publication date: 1993
- Publication place: Canada
- Followed by: The Summer King

The Hunter's Moon is a fantasy novel by O.R. Melling about two teenage cousins, one Irish, the other Canadian, that set out to find a magic doorway to the Faraway Country, where humans must bow to the little people. It was published in 1993 by Amulet Books and is the first book in the Chronicles of Faerie, with the second being The Summer King, the third being The Light-Bearer's Daughter, and the fourth and final being The Book of Dreams. It was awarded the Ruth Schwartz Children's Book Award in 1994.

== Plot ==
Gwen, a Canadian, is visiting her cousin, Findabhair (finn-ah-veer), in Ireland. The two, who keep regular correspondence, share a deep love of Irish mythology. Since their youth, they have tried to find a doorway to another world called Faerieland. Now sixteen, they travel to Tara, without telling their parents, the ancient seat of the High Kings in Ireland in search of adventure.

While they are there, the cousins challenge an ancient law by sleeping in a fairy mound. That night the King of Faeries, Finvara, comes to take them away. Since he is King of Dreams, he comes to them in their sleep and asks them to come with him. Findabhair says yes, but Gwen refuses. Therefore, since he is bound by an ancient law, the King only takes Findabhair, leaving Gwen to wake up wondering about her cousin's safety. Gwen decides to rescue her cousin from her fate, only to find she is happy. Gwen does not want her to stay with the faeries because they are immortal, partying teenagers. As Gwen tries continuously to find the Faeries, which is hard for her since the King is hindering her, she meets many good friends, including a middle-aged businessman, a farm girl, a king (who becomes her boyfriend) of an island, called Island Island, and even befriends the second in command of the Faeries, Midir.

When she finally catches up with the faeries fast pace, she learns that she or her cousin must be the sacrifice to an evil ancient creature known as Crom Cruac, the Great Worm, supposedly the serpent from the Garden of Eden. Her cousin voluntarily chooses to be the sacrifice, upsetting Gwen and the King of Faeries, who has fallen in love with her. In the end, with the help of many friends, Findabhair decides not to be sacrificed, but to be the first person to fight the serpent. With their friends by their sides, Findabhair and Gwen attack the serpent after being equipped for battle by the Land of Light, but after a while Findabhair gets blasted with poison from the serpent and falls unconscious with her life on the edge. The King of Faeries, in a desperate act of love, gives himself up as the sacrifice. He is greatly mourned, and Midir becomes king. The friends decide to meet again in a year.

After a year, they meet again at Island Island and reminisce. Then they suddenly hear music. As they search for the source of the music, they find the king, alive. The worm had only taken his immortality instead of killing him, and now the faerie was mortal and without memory. They understand that it's going to be hard for the king, because of his loss. But overjoyed as they are, they promise to explain everything to him.

== Reception ==
In its review Kirkus Reviews praised the novel's richly drawn backdrop of Ireland and described the story as a strong opening to the series, noting its blend of magic, adventure, and personal stakes as the protagonist pursues her cousin into the realm of faerie.

== Cultural references ==
"The Hunter's Moon" contains numerous literary and culture references. There are two editions of the novel which include different references. The newer edition includes:

- "The Rocky Road to Dublin" by Dropkick Murphys
- "Something wicked this way comes" from Macbeth.
- Irish tourist attractions such as the Hill of Tara.
- The Lord of the Rings posters which hang on Findabhair's walls.

The original edition includes references to:

- Robin Hood: Prince of Thieves
- Bryan Adams
