= Yuck, A Love Story =

2000 children's picture book by Don Gillmor, illustrated by Marie-Louise Gay

- Author: Don Gillmor
- Publisher: Marie-Louise Gay

Yuck, A Love Story is a children's picture book by Don Gillmor, illustrated by Marie-Louise Gay. It was first published in 2000.

== Summary ==
The plot of Yuck, A Love Story centres on a young boy named Austin, who is upset that a girl named Amy is moving into the house next door. Feigning disinterest in Amy, Austin nevertheless wants to impress her. She is hard to impress, although he wears a superhero costume and builds a life-size statue of an Apatosaurus in her yard using Popsicle sticks. He tells his friend Sternberg that Amy is "yucky". He lassos the Moon to give to her as a birthday present, but it drags him to the Arctic before he can wrangle it back home. The Moon proves to be made of smelly blue cheese, which causes both Austin and Amy to say "Yuck" and decide they would prefer to have birthday cake.

== Reception ==
The review by Quill and Quire says, "The exuberant zaniness of Gay's watercolour illustrations nicely complements Gillmor's wry sense of humour." The School Library Journal describes the book as "An amusing picture book fantasy with an endearing young protagonist." Gregory Walters at Boyz Read says, "Gillmor's tale captures Austin's simultaneous feelings of repulsion and attraction to the new neighbor. Why is she so...different? The author adds whimsical details, worthy of smiles if not chuckles... Gay enhances the story with her quirky, endearing illustrations."

== Awards ==
- Winner of the 2000 Governor General's Award for Children's Illustration
- Finalist for the CBA Illustrator of the Year Award
