= The Light-Bearer's Daughter =

2001 book by O. R. Melling

- Author: O. R. Melling
- Language: English
- Series: Chronicles of Faerie
- Genre: Fantasy
- Publisher: Penguin Canada
- Publication date: 2001
- Publication place: Canada
- Preceded by: The Summer King
- Followed by: The Book of Dreams

The Light-Bearer's Daughter is a fantasy novel by O.R. Melling. It was published on March 1, 2001, and is the third book in the Chronicles of Faerie series, the first being The Hunter's Moon, the second being The Summer King, and the fourth and final being The Book of Dreams.

== Plot ==
The novel follows Dana, an 11-year-old girl living in Ireland with her father, Gabriel, an ecologist and musician. Dana’s mother vanished when she was very young, and the unresolved loss shapes much of her inner world.

When Gabriel announces that they will relocate to Canada, Dana rebels and runs away into the forests of Wicklow. There she is approached by a mysterious Faerie “Lady,” who tasks her with delivering a message to awaken the Mountain King, also called the Summer King, whose slumber threatens both the human and faerie worlds. Dana soon discovers that her mission is tied to an emerging environmental crisis: the destruction of a glen to build a new highway. Along her journey, Dana encounters boggles, a talking wolf, and other creatures of Celtic folklore. Her quest ultimately forces her to confront long-buried memories and uncover the truth about her mother, her identity, and her role in both realms.

== Reception ==
Critical reception has been mixed to positive. Kirkus Reviews described the plot as "muddled" and noted uneven dialogue, though the review acknowledged the author's clear affection for Ireland and Faerie traditions. Quill & Quire praised the book's pacing, evocative setting, and mythic structure, while noting that some thematic threads, particularly dreams as a bridge between realms, could have been developed further. CM Magazine highlighted the story's imaginative fantasy elements, Dana's character development, and the strong environmental themes, recommending it for readers age 11 and up.

The Light-Bearer’s Daughter has received several accolades: it won the Green Earth Book Award in 2008 and was named to the ALA Top 10 Youth Books for the Environment in the same year. It was also nominated for the Silver Birch Award and the Manitoba Reader’s Choice Award in 2003.

== Publication history ==
The Light-Bearer’s Daughter was first published on 1 March 2001 by Penguin Canada. Subsequent editions include a 2007 hardcover released by Amulet Books and several later paperback and e-book editions.
