= The Summer King (novel) =

1999 novel by O. R. Melling

- Author: O. R. Melling
- Language: English
- Series: Chronicles of Faerie
- Genre: Fantasy
- Publication date: 1999
- Publication place: Canada
- Preceded by: The Hunter's Moon
- Followed by: The Light-Bearer's Daughter

The Summer King is a fantasy novel by O. R. Melling about twin sisters and the Irish fairy world. It was first published on June 30, 1999, and is the second book in the Chronicles of Faerie series, the first being The Hunter's Moon, the third being The Light-Bearer's Daughter, and the fourth and last being The Book of Dreams.

== Plot ==
Laurel Rowan, a Canadian teenager grieving the recent death of her friend Deirdre, travels to Ireland to complete the trip they had planned together. While retracing Deirdre's steps, Laurel learns that her friend had become involved with the realm of Faerie and had taken part in a mysterious quest linked to the Summer King, a powerful supernatural figure whose fate affects both the human and faerie worlds.

Determined to understand what happened, Laurel joins forces with Deirdre's twin brother, Ian, and the two enter the faerie realm. Their search leads them through enchanted and dangerous landscapes as they uncover Deirdre's role in a prophecy meant to restore the weakened Summer King. Laurel ultimately takes up the task her friend left unfinished, helping to restore balance between the worlds and finding closure for her grief.

== Reception ==
In its review Kirkus Reviews called the novel a compelling fantasy featuring twin sisters and the interaction between humans and faerie realms, noting its themes of good versus evil and its exploration of themes such as responsibility and belief.

Philippa Sheppard, writing for Quill & Quire, praised the world-building and imaginative scope of the story, while suggesting that some aspects of the pacing and stylistic execution were uneven.
