= Adventures of Cow =

2005 children's picture book series

- The front cover art for Adventures of Cow.
- Author: Lori Korchek
- Illustrator: Marshall Taylor
- Genre: Children's
- Publisher: Tricycle Press
- Publication date: May 1, 2005
- Publication place: United States
- Media type: Print (hardcover)

Adventures of Cow is a 2005 children's picture book series written by Lori Korchek and illustrated by Marshall Taylor. The sequel, Adventures of Cow, Too, was published in 2007.

== Series ==
Adventures of Cow

A squish toy cow travels in a yellow backpack. She asks various misidentified farm animals how to get home, because she is very confused and not really smart. Back home, she talks to her family which are a penguin doorstep, a hippo vase, and a vegetable brush. Her aunt, a vegetable brush, suggests that she write books about her adventures. That causes the toy cow to become famous and appear on TV.

Adventures of Cow Too

Cow needs groceries and she has just a few items on the list. Also, Cow needs to make it home on time. It has vocabulary mix-ups and silly on-location photographs.

== Reception ==
Adventures of Cow was selected as a Sonder Books Stand Out (2005) and received positive reviews from Eclectica Magazine, The Book Stacks, Kirkus Reviews, and Armchair Interviews.

The School Library Journal reviewed in poorly, stating, "For children in the concrete stages of development, this book will be confusing, not funny. Other youngsters will just be bored."
