= On My Walk =

Children's book by Kari-Lynn Winters

- Author: Kari-Lynn Winters
- Illustrator: Christina Leist
- Language: English
- Genre: children's fiction
- Publisher: Tradewind Books
- Publication date: 2009
- Publication place: Canada
- Media type: Print (Hardcover)
- Pages: 32
- ISBN: 978-1-896580-61-6 (first edition, hardcover)
- OCLC: 423601674

On My Walk is a young children's book (recommended for ages 2–5) by Kari-Lynn Winters, illustrated by Christina Leist. It was published in 2009 by Tradewind Books.

== Awards ==
- Finalist: 2010 BC Book Prize ("Christie Harris Illustrated Children's Literature Prize") and sponsored tour
- Nominated: 2010-2011 Chocolate Lilly British Columbia Reader's Choice Award
- Selected: Toronto Public Library First and Best of 2010
- Selected: Resource Links Year's Best 2010
- Selected: Edmonton Public Library's 100 Great Books to Read Together, 2012
- Selected: TVOParents Book Club Best Books for your 6-8 Year Old (2013) and Books for the Budding Activist (2011)

== Plot ==
Mothers and toddlers take a stroll through Vancouver streets and parks, hearing the sounds of animals around them, and find themselves caught in a summer rainstorm on a Kitsilano beach. The writing style is a unique sing-song rhythm employing children's onomatopoeia.

== Stage adaptation ==
In 2016, the book was adapted for stage, with an original screenplay by Winters and Marcie Nestman. Commissioned by Carousal Theatre for Young People in Vancouver BC, the play opens in June 2016.
