= Jeffrey and Sloth =

2007 children's book by Kari-Lynn Winters and Ben Hodson

- Book cover, featuring the two characters Jeffrey and the Sloth (sitting in chair facing Jeffrey)
- Author: Kari-Lynn Winters
- Illustrator: Ben Hodson
- Language: English
- Genre: children's fiction
- Publisher: Orca Book Publishers
- Publication date: 2007
- Publication place: Canada
- Media type: Print (Hardcover, Paperback)
- Pages: 32
- ISBN: 978-1-55143-974-7 (first edition, softcover); ISBN 978-1-55143-323-3 (first edition, hardcover)
- OCLC: 180756886

Jeffrey and Sloth is a Canadian children's book by Kari-Lynn Winters and Ben Hodson. It was published in March 2007 by Orca Book Publishers.

Jeffrey and Sloth first appeared in a 2004 issue of Chameleon, a children's magazine published by the University of British Columbia, as "Jeffrey's Wor(l)ds Meet Sloth". Orca selected this book as one of 9 out of 1600 manuscripts chosen for publication in 2007. The book has come to life beyond the page, as a literacy play performed by Tickle Trunk Players in schools in Vancouver, Calgary, and Toronto.

== Awards ==
- Finalist: 2008 BC Book Prize (Christie Harris Illustrated Children's Literature Prize) and sponsored tour
- Winner: 2009 Chocolate Lilly British Columbia Reader's Choice Award, Silver Medal
- Winner: ABCs of Education best books of 2006-2007
- Nominated: 2008 BLUE SPRUCE Ontario Library Association award

== Plot ==
Jeffrey can't think of how to start his writing assignment so he doodles instead, only to have his doodle of a sloth come to life and order him about. Jeffrey struggles against the strong-willed Sloth, in the process telling a tale and completing his homework.
