= Buzz about Bees =

2013 book by Kari-Lynn Winters

- Author: Kari-Lynn Winters
- Language: English
- Genre: children's non-fiction
- Publisher: Fitzhenry and Whiteside
- Publication date: 2013
- Publication place: Canada
- Media type: Print (Hardcover)
- Pages: 32
- ISBN: 978-1554552023
- OCLC: 760975752

Buzz about Bees is a 2013 non-fiction book for ages 7+ by Kari-Lynn Winters, published by Fitzhenry & Whiteside. An award-winning entry in the publisher's nature series, following Lowdown on Earthworms, it introduces children to concepts of endangered species, the unique role bees play in the ecosystem, and their relationship with humans.

== Awards ==
- 2015: Shortlisted: Alberta provincial readers'-choice Rocky Mountain Book Award
- 2014: Shortlisted: Forest of Reading's "Silver Birch Express" award
- 2014: Nominated: Canadian Science Writers' Association's "Outstanding Youth Book"
- 2014: Selected: Ontario Library Association's "Best Bets"
- 2013: Selected: Resource Links magazine's "Best Books of 2013"
- 2013: Recommended, Canadian Toy Testing Council Toy Report 2014 "Best Books"
- 2013: Selected: Canadian Children's Book Centre's "Best Books for Kids and Teens"
