= Gift Days =

Children's book by Kari-Lynn Winters

Gift days
- Nassali, holding her paper on her way to school.
- Author: Kari-Lynn Winters
- Illustrator: Stephen Taylor
- Language: English
- Genre: children's fiction
- Publisher: Fitzhenry & Whiteside
- Publication date: 2012
- Publication place: Canada
- Media type: Print (Hardcover)
- Pages: 32
- ISBN: 9781554551927 (first edition, hardcover)

Gift Days is a children's book (recommended for ages 8 and up) by Kari-Lynn Winters, illustrated by Stephen Taylor. It was published in 2012 by Fitzhenry & Whiteside.

== Plot ==
Young Nassali longs to read and write like her brother, but since her mother's death from AIDS, Nassali is responsible for looking after her younger siblings and running the household. There is no time for books and learning. Then one day, she wakes up to discover that her chores have been taken care of. It is her first gift day. From that day on, once a week, her brother gives Nassali the gift of time so that she can pursue her dream of an education, just as her mother would have wanted.

== Awards ==
- Finalist: 2013 BC Book Prize ("Christie Harris Illustrated Children's Literature Prize")
- Finalist: Ontario Library Association's Rainforest of Reading, July 2013
- Top four: CBC Radio's Here and Now Recommendations For Children's Books, December 2012

== Educational activism ==
Proceeds from this book are being used to support the charity Because I am a Girl, a social movement to "unleash the power of girls and women to claim a brighter future for girls in the developing world" through education and women's rights; at its book launch in November 2012, enough money was raised to send 10 girls to school in Uganda for a year. Included with the book is information about organizations committed to supporting girls like Nassali. Winters' method of social activism, via social semiotics and critical positioning, and Gift Days demonstrate how one's socio-cultural environment contributes to literacy — "an education is the path to a better life."
