= Simply Read Books =

Canadian publishing house

- Country of origin: Canada
- Headquarters location: Vancouver, BC
- Distribution: Simon & Schuster (US); Turnaround Publisher Services (UK); NewSouth Books (Australia)
- Publication types: Books
- Fiction genres: children's literature
- Official website: www.simplyreadbooks.com

Simply Read Books is a children's specific publishing house situated in Vancouver, BC, Canada.

== Awards (incomplete list) ==
Books published by Simply Read Books have won the following awards:

- Governor General's Literary Award for Children's Literature, Illustration
- Marilyn Baillie Picture Book Award
- Awards for Excellence in Book Design in Canada by the Alcuin Society

== Authors and illustrators (incomplete list) ==
- Dan Bar-el
- Christine Dencer
- Iassen Ghiuselev
- Elisa Gutiérrez
- Ryan Heshka
- Tamara James
- Sarah Lolley
- Thomas Aquinas Maguire
- John Marsden (writer)
- Julie Morstad
- Matthew Porter
- Sara O'Leary
- Anne Renaud
- Ashley Spires
- Shaun Tan
- Duncan Weller
- Kari-Lynn Winters

== Controversy ==
- Simply Read Books has had complaints of late payments, breaches of contracts, and other allegations by many of its authors. This publisher had been the subject of negative articles in Publishers Weekly, the CBC (Canadian Broadcasting Company), and the Quill and Quire.
