= National Day for Truth and Reconciliation =

Canadian day of remembrance for victims of residential schools

National Day for Truth and Reconciliation Journée nationale de la vérité et de la réconciliation
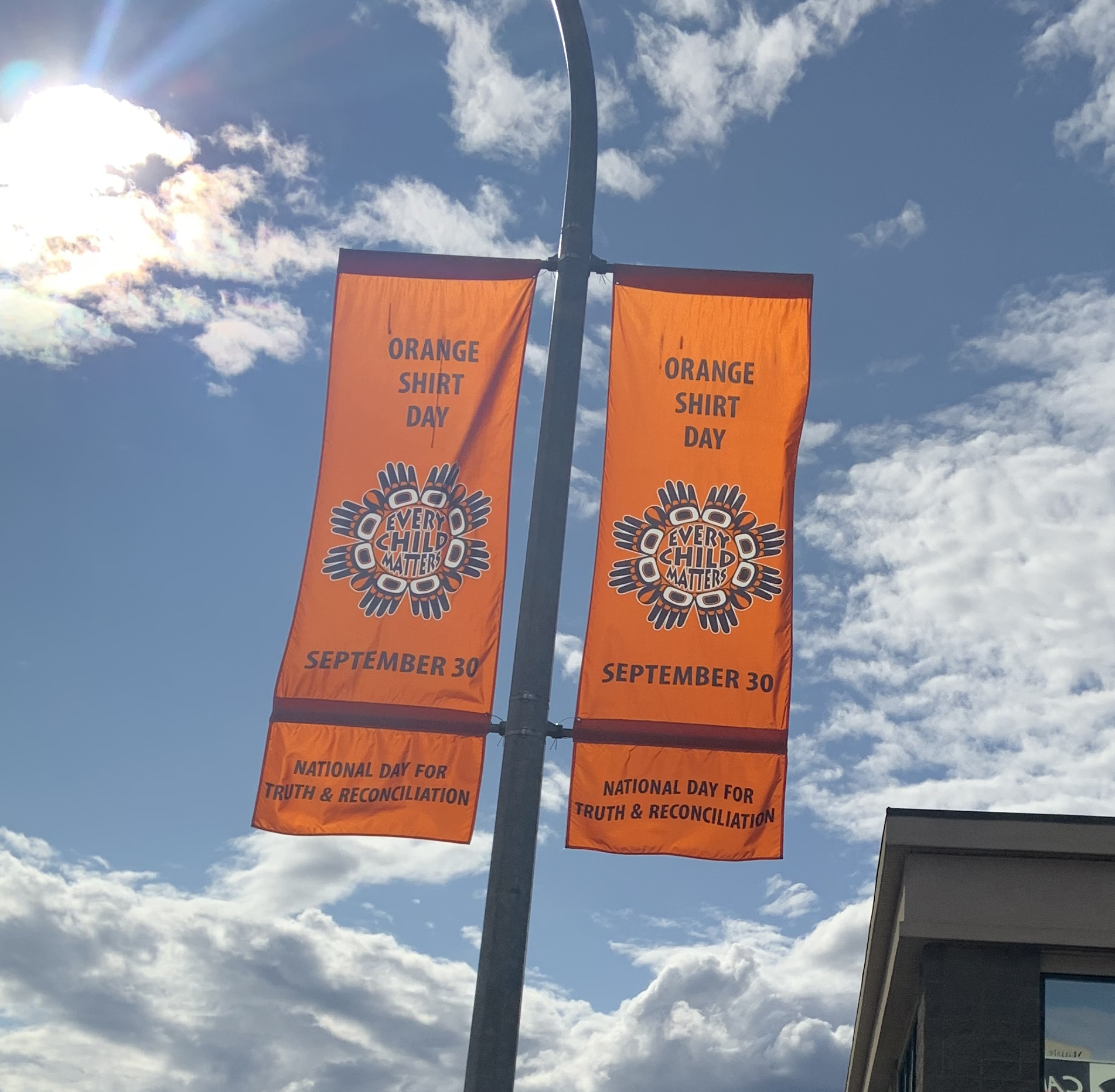
- Banners advertising Orange Shirt Day flying in Williams Lake, BC – a city located within T'exelc (Williams Lake First Nation territory)
- Also called: Orange Shirt Day; T&R Day
- Type: National
- Significance: National day to recognize the effect of the Canadian Indian residential school system
- Date: September 30
- Frequency: Annual
- First time: 2013 (Orange Shirt Day); 2021 (National Day for Truth and Reconciliation)
- Started by: Phyllis Webstad
- Related to: National Indigenous Peoples Day

The National Day for Truth and Reconciliation (NDTR; French: Journée nationale de la vérité et de la réconciliation; sometimes shortened to T&R Day), originally and still colloquially known as Orange Shirt Day (French: Jour du chandail orange), is a Canadian day of memorial to recognize the atrocities and multi-generational effects of the Canadian Indian residential school system. (Note: Indian has been used because of the historical nature of the article and the precision of the name. It was, and continues to be, used by government officials, Indigenous peoples and historians while referencing the school system. The use of the name also provides relevant context about the era in which the system was established, specifically one in which Indigenous peoples in Canada were homogeneously referred to as Indians rather than by language that distinguishes First Nations, Inuit, and Métis peoples. Use of Indian is limited throughout the article to proper nouns and references to government legislation.) It occurs every year on September 30.

As of March 2023, NDTR is a statutory holiday for:

- federal government employees and private-sector employees to whom the Canada Labour Code applies;
- provincial government employees in Alberta, Nova Scotia, and New Brunswick.
- all workers in British Columbia, Manitoba, the Northwest Territories, Nunavut, Prince Edward Island, and Yukon.

The Truth and Reconciliation Commission, established to document the effects of the residential school system, ran from 2008 to 2015, and concluded that the attempt to forcefully assimilate Indigenous communities was a cultural genocide. The residential school system was created as a civilizing mission to isolate Indigenous children from the influence of their own culture and religion in order to assimilate them into the dominant Euro-Canadian culture.

Orange Shirt Day was first established as a day of observance in 2013. The use of an orange shirt as a symbol was inspired by the accounts of Phyllis Jack Webstad, whose personal clothing—including a new orange shirt—was taken from her during her first day of residential schooling, and never returned. The orange shirt is thus used as a symbol of the forced assimilation of Indigenous children that the residential school system enforced.

The day was elevated to a statutory holiday for federal workers and workers in federally-regulated workplaces by the Parliament of Canada in 2021, and named "National Day for Truth and Reconciliation", in light of the claims of over 1,000 unmarked graves near former residential school sites.

== Background ==
=== Indian residential school system ===
Shortly after Confederation in 1867, the ministers in the new Cabinet of Canada inherited the responsibility of advising the Crown on the treaties signed between it and the First Nations of Canada. Prime Minister John A. Macdonald was faced with a country with disparate cultures and identities and wanted to forge a new Canadian identity to unite the country and ensure its survival. It was Macdonald's goal to absorb the First Nations into the general population of Canada and extinguish their culture. In 1887, he wrote "The great aim of our legislation has been to do away with the tribal system and assimilate the Indian people in all respects with the other inhabitants of the Dominion as speedily as they are fit to change." In 1878, he commissioned Nicholas Flood Davin to write a report about residential schools in the United States. One year later, Davin reported that only residential schools could separate aboriginal children from their parents and culture and cause them "to be merged and lost" within the nation. Davin argued that the government should work with the Christian churches to open these schools.

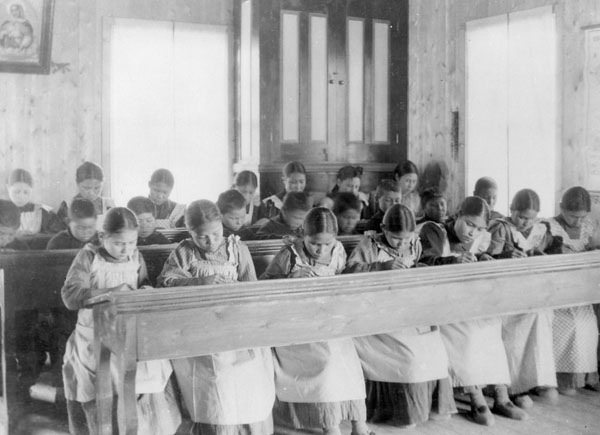
The schools aimed to eliminate Indigenous languages and cultures and replace them with the English or French language and Christian beliefs. Pictured is Fort Resolution, NWT.

Beginning in 1883, the government began funding Indian residential schools across Canada, which were run primarily by the Roman Catholic Church and the Anglican Church; but also included the United Church of Canada, the Methodist Church, and the Presbyterian Church. When the separation of children from their parents was resisted, the government responded by making school attendance compulsory in 1894 and empowered the Royal Canadian Mounted Police to seize children from reserves and bring them to the residential schools. When parents came to take their children away from the schools, the pass system was created, banning Indigenous people from leaving their reserve without a pass from an Indian agent.

Conditions at the schools were rough, as schools were underfunded and the infectious disease of tuberculosis was rampant. Over the course of the system's existence—more than a century long—approximately 150,000 children were placed in residential schools nationally. The Truth and Reconciliation Commission of Canada details deaths of approximately 3,200 children in residential schools, representing a 2.1% mortality rate. However, Justice Murray Sinclair, the chair of the Truth and Reconciliation Commission later stated that they only included deaths of children that they had records for and that the true number of deaths could be as high as 6,000.

Most of the recorded student deaths at residential schools took place before the 1950s. The most common cause of death was tuberculosis, which was also a common cause of death among children across Canada at that time; but, students also died from other causes, including other diseases, fire, accident, drowning, and hypothermia, some of which occurred while running away from school. Some residential schools had mortality rates of 30% or more. The mortality rates at residential schools were much higher than the mortality rates of Canadian children as a whole. Many deaths were the result of neglect, as schools frequently denied basic medical care or assistance to their students until just before they died; in many cases, school staff did not bother searching for missing children until the next day.

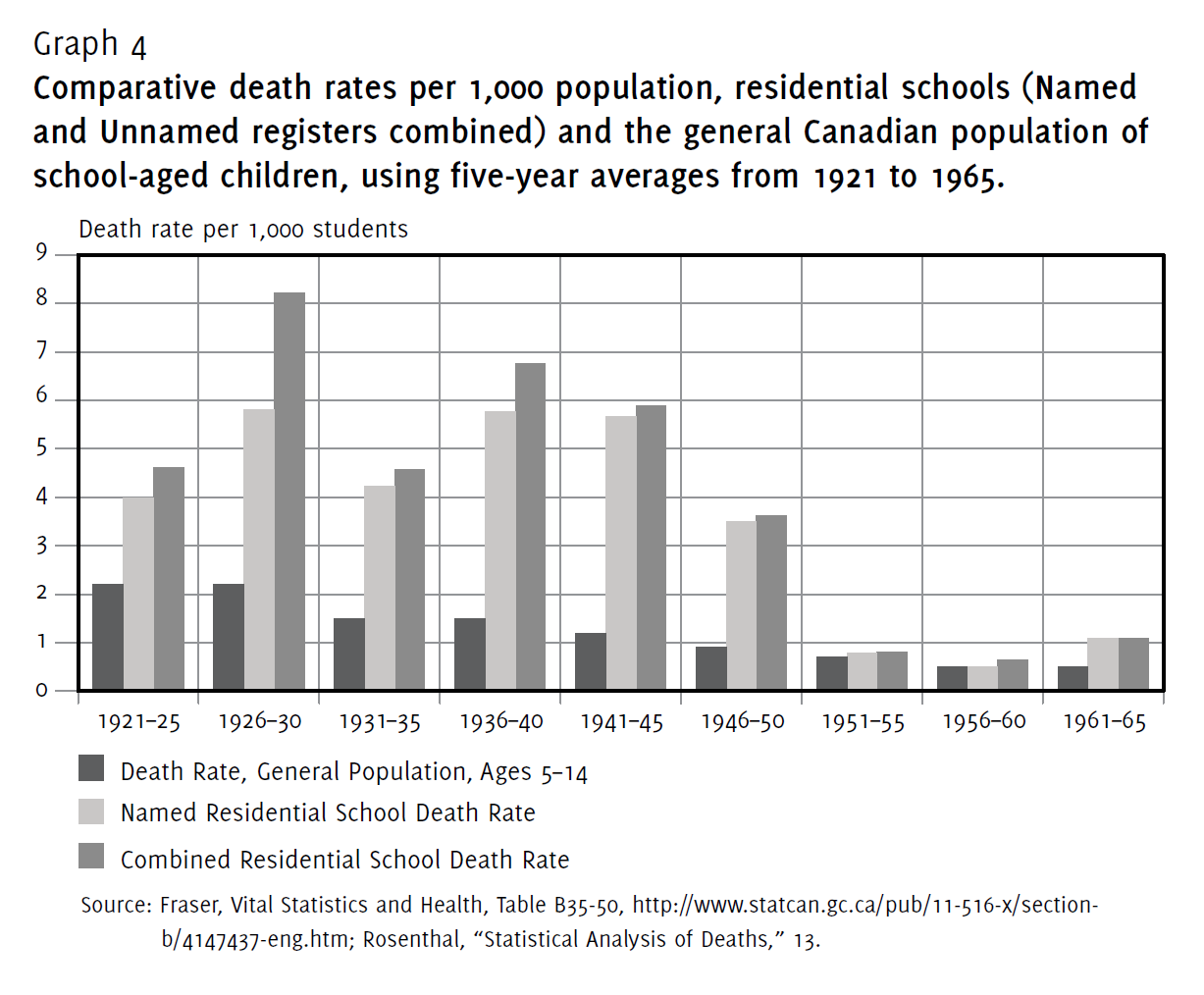
Comparative death rates per 1,000 for school aged children in Canada (1921–1965)

Dr. Peter Bryce reported to the Department of Indian Affairs in 1897 about the high student mortality rates at residential schools due to tuberculosis. Bryce's report was leaked to journalists, prompting calls for reform from across the country. Despite this public outcry, Bryce's recommendations were largely ignored. Duncan Campbell Scott, the deputy superintendent of Indian Affairs from 1913 to 1932, who supported the assimilation policy, wrote in 1914, "the system was open to criticism. Insufficient care was exercised in the admission of children to the schools. The well-known predisposition of Indians to tuberculosis resulted in a very large percentage of deaths among the pupils."

Many schools did not communicate the news of the deaths of students to the students' families, burying the children in unmarked graves; in one-third of recorded deaths, the names of the students who had died were not recorded. In some schools, sexual abuse was common and students were forced to work to help raise money for the school. Students were beaten for speaking their indigenous languages.

By the 1950s, the government began to relax restrictions on the First Nations of Canada and began to work towards shutting the schools down. The government seized control of the residential schools from the churches in 1969 and, by the 1980s, only a few schools remained open, with the last school, Kivalliq Hall, located in Rankin Inlet, closing in 1996.

=== Truth and Reconciliation ===
In 1986, the United Church of Canada apologized for its role in the residential school system. The Anglican church followed suit in 1992. Some Catholic organizations have apologized for their role in the residential school system and, in 2009, Pope Benedict XVI expressed sorrow for the experiences of the residential school survivors, but the Roman Catholic Church delayed a formal apology for its role in the residential school system. In 2017, Prime Minister Justin Trudeau asked the Pope to issue an apology over its role in the Indian residential school system. In 2022, Pope Francis travelled to Canada, where, at the site of a former residential school and in front of Indigenous representatives, he formally apologized for the Catholic Church's role in the residential school system.

In 1991, the Royal Commission on Aboriginal Peoples was formed to investigate the relationship between indigenous peoples in Canada, the government of Canada, and Canadian society as a whole. When its final report was presented five years later, it led the government to make a statement of reconciliation in 1998 and established the Aboriginal Healing Foundation.

Prime Minister Stephen Harper apologized in 2008, on behalf of the federal Cabinet, for the Indian residential school system and created the Truth and Reconciliation Commission of Canada to find out what happened at the schools. The commission released its final report in 2015, which concluded that the Indian residential school system was an act of "cultural genocide" against the First Nations of Canada, as it disrupted the ability of parents and communities to pass on their indigenous languages and cultural practices to their children, leading to 70% of Canada's Aboriginal languages being classified as endangered. It found that subpar education deliberately offered at the residential school system created a poorly educated indigenous population in Canada, which reduced the incomes those students could earn as adults and the educational achievement of their children and grandchildren, who were frequently raised in low-income homes. It also found that the sexual and physical abuse received at the schools created life-long trauma in residential school survivors, trauma and abuse which was often passed down to their children and grandchildren, which continues to create victims of the residential school system today.

== History ==
=== History of Orange Shirt Day ===
Orange Shirt Day was first established as an observance in 2013, as part of an effort to promote awareness and education of the Canadian residential school system and the effect it has had on Indigenous communities for over a century.

The inspiration for Orange Shirt Day came from residential school survivor Phyllis Jack Webstad, who shared her story at a St. Joseph Mission (SJM) Residential School Commemoration Project and Reunion event held in Williams Lake, British Columbia, in the spring of 2013. Webstad recounted her first day of residential schooling at six years old, when she was stripped of her clothes, including the new orange shirt her grandmother bought her, which was never returned. The orange shirt now symbolizes how the residential school system took away the indigenous identities of its students. However, the association of the colour with the First Nations goes back to antiquity, the colour represents sunshine, truth-telling, health, regeneration, strength and power.

Today, Orange Shirt Day exists as a legacy of the SJM Project, and September 30, the annual date of the event, signifies the time of year when Indigenous children were historically taken from their homes to residential schools. The official tagline of the day, "Every Child Matters", reminds Canadians that all peoples' cultural experiences are important.

Education on the history of residential schools and their assimilation practices are also encouraged, drawing from Webstad's experience in particular. For instance, many communities have held memorial walks, film screenings, and public lectures to raise awareness about Indigenous history. Accordingly, school boards across Canada have begun to use this event to teach children about the system.

=== Federal government recognition ===
Minister of Indigenous Services Jane Philpott and Minister of Indigenous and Northern Affairs Carolyn Bennett in 2017 encouraged people across Canada to participate in this commemorative and educational event. The following year, the Department of Canadian Heritage and Multiculturalism announced that it was considering tabling a bill in Parliament to establish a statutory holiday that recognized the legacy of residential schools; September 30 was one of the dates considered. The Heritage Committee chose Orange Shirt Day, and Georgina Jolibois submitted a private member's bill to the House of Commons, where it passed on March 21, 2019. However, the bill was unable to make it through the Senate before parliament was dissolved ahead of an election.

During the subsequent parliamentary session, Heritage Minister Steven Guilbeault tabled a new bill on September 29, 2020, proposing Orange Shirt Day become a national statutory holiday, similar to the previous proposal by Jolibois. The new holiday would be officially named the National Day for Truth and Reconciliation. On May 28, 2021, the day after it was reported that the remains of 215 bodies (now referred to as 200 "targets of interest" by Dr. Sarah Beaulieu who performed the search) were discovered in an unmarked cemetery on the grounds of the former Kamloops Indian Residential School, all parties in the House of Commons agreed to fast-track the bill, which passed in the House by unanimous consent. The bill passed the Senate unanimously six days later and received royal assent on June 3, 2021.

On September 30, 2021, Queen Elizabeth II, Canada's head of state, issued a message marking the day:

I join with all Canadians on this first National Day for Truth and Reconciliation to reflect on the painful history that Indigenous peoples endured in residential schools in Canada and on the work that remains to heal and to continue to build an inclusive society.

The legislation made September 30 a statutory holiday for federal government employees and private-sector employees to whom the Canada Labour Code applies.

==== Controversy ====
National Day for Truth and Reconciliation was first observed as a federal holiday in 2021. On the first year it was observed, Prime Minister Justin Trudeau had been invited to spend the day with the Tk'emlúps te Secwépemc nation near Kamloops, B.C., near the place the first Indian residential school unmarked graves were alleged to have been discovered earlier that year. Trudeau ignored the invitation, and his schedule showed him having meetings in Ottawa that day. However, Trudeau instead took an unannounced private holiday in Tofino, British Columbia, attracting widespread criticism from the public and media alike. Kúkpi7 (Chief) Rosanne Casimir of the Tk'emlúps te Secwépemc described his lack of attendance as a "gut punch to the community." Trudeau later apologized and vowed to "make it right".

In 2023's National Truth and Reconciliation Day, Justin Trudeau said that denialism was on the rise, and the whole truth needed to be uncovered.

In August 2026, Rebel News announced it was selling orange T-shirts on its website with slogans including "Still no proof," "You can't handle the truth," "Buried Truth" and "Dig Deeper," as well as "Canada was built not stolen." This was condemned by Phyllis Webstad and other Indigenous activists and politicians. Ezra Levant, founder and owner of Rebel News, said "the stated purpose of the National Truth and Reconciliation Day is noble – to honour residential school survivors and their communities by recognizing the lasting impacts of Canada's residential school system, so Canadians can better understand its legacy as part of our ongoing journey toward truth, healing, and reconciliation. But five years later, Canadians are still being told that there are some truths they're not allowed to question." Rebel News staff are "dedicated to freedom of expression including the right to seek the truth" and "these orange shirts are a response for people who are forced to wear orange shirts at school or at work, as part of an 'official' political narrative."

=== Provincial/territorial government recognition ===
provincial government employees all workers

The governments of British Columbia, Manitoba, Nova Scotia, Northwest Territories, Nunavut, Prince Edward Island, and the Yukon added September 30 to their relevant legislations as a holiday to some extent. As of March 2023, NDTR is a statutory holiday for all workers in British Columbia, Northwest Territories, Prince Edward Island, and Yukon.

In 2021, subsequently following the federal government's creation of the new federal holiday, the Government of the Northwest Territories amended their Public Service Act to allow for NWT employees to observe the holiday that year. The following year, on June 3, 2022, the Legislative Assembly of the Northwest Territories brought Bill 47 into force, making National Day for Truth and Reconciliation a statutory holiday for all employees in the territory.

In 2021, Premier Dennis King of Prince Edward Island introduced an amendment to the Employment Standards Act to officially recognize September 30 as a provincial statutory holiday for residents, which passed on November 17 that year.

In spring 2022, Commissioner of Nunavut Eva Aariak gave assent at the Legislative Assembly of Nunavut to make National Day for Truth and Reconciliation a holiday for territorial government employees and territorially-regulated businesses.

In November 2022, the Legislature of Yukon unanimously approved National Truth and Reconciliation Day as statutory holiday in the territory. The bill was sponsored by MLA Annie Blake.

In February 2023, B.C. Minister Harry Bains introduced a bill in the BC Legislature to make September 30 a paid statutory holiday in the province. The legislation was passed on March 9, 2023, making National Day for Truth and Reconciliation a statutory holiday for provincial workers, via amendments to the province's Employment Standards Act.

== Film and television ==
On October 11, 2020, CBC Television and the Aboriginal Peoples Television Network jointly aired Every Child Matters: Reconciliation Through Education, a television special produced by the National Centre for Truth and Reconciliation to mark Orange Shirt Day by highlighting the stories of various residential school survivors. The special received two Canadian Screen Award nominations at the 9th Canadian Screen Awards in 2021, for Best Children's or Youth Non-Fiction Program or Series and Best Picture Editing in a Factual Program or Series (Craig Anderson, Cathy Gulkin, James Kinistino and Ken Yan).

Webstad was profiled in the 2021 documentary film Returning Home.

In September 2021, CBC Television aired the documentary We Know the Truth: Stories to Inspire Reconciliation.

== Official shirts ==
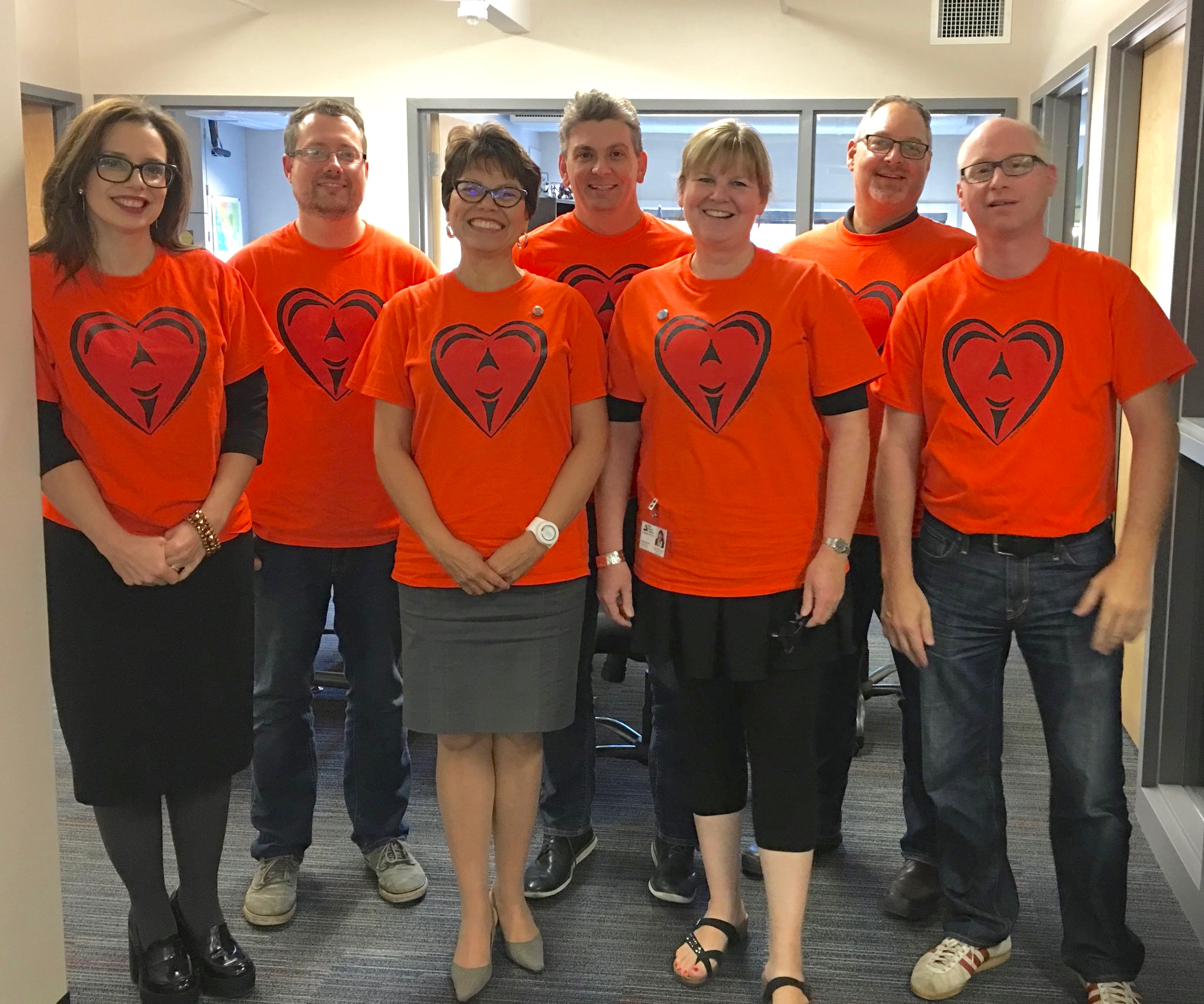
Teachers in a Canadian school wearing orange shirts for Orange Shirt Day (2016)

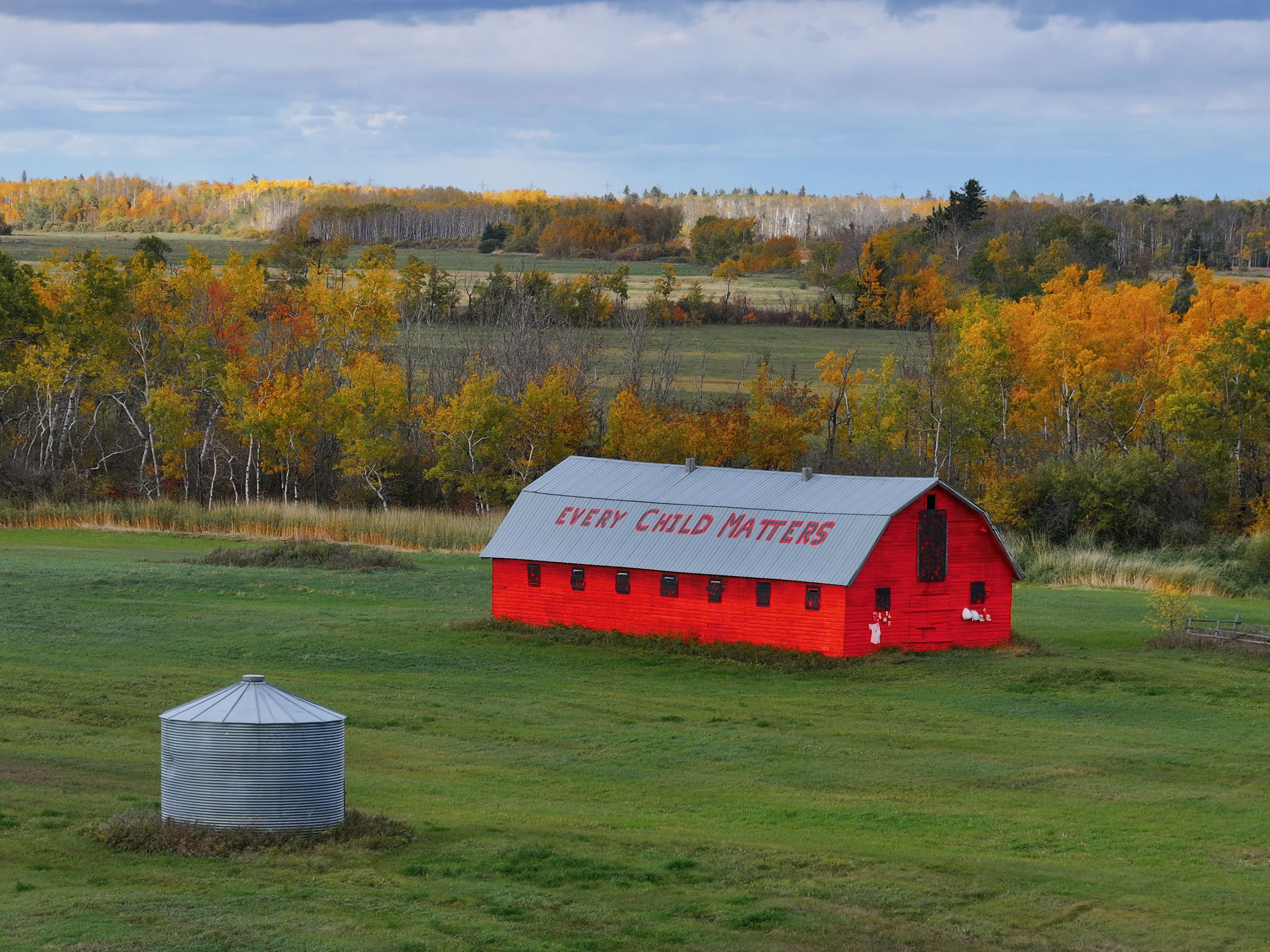
"Every Child Matters" painted on a barn in Manitoba

The Orange Shirt Society was founded by the people involved in the creation of Orange Shirt Day, and is headquartered in Williams Lake, British Columbia. Every year, they release an official Orange Shirt Day T-shirt, which features a design by an Indigenous artist and the tagline "Every Child Matters"; proceeds from the sales of the shirt go towards the Orange Shirt Society.

In 2017, the supply of official orange shirts did not meet demand. As a workaround, some communities created their own shirts. Designer Carey Newman made one that sold out in under two days. Newman's father attended a residential school and his design commemorated this.

The Orange Shirt Society then approved of other Indigenous artists creating orange shirts. Their policy states that while they retain copyright over Orange Shirt Day, other people and organizations may make their own shirts provided that some of the profits go towards the Orange Shirt Society or other Indigenous charities and causes, and meet other technical requirements as stated on their website.

== See also ==
- Canadian Indian residential school system – Schools to assimilate Indigenous children
- First Nations in Canada – Indigenous people in Canada who are not Inuit or Métis
- Indigenous peoples in Canada
- National Centre for Truth and Reconciliation – Canadian archive of residential schools history
- National Indigenous Peoples Day – Day recognizing First Nations of Canada

Other Countries:

- I Apologize campaign – A grassroots initiative in Turkey
- Indigenous Peoples' Day – United States
- National Sorry Day – Australia
