= 1960 in science fiction =

The year 1960 was marked, in science fiction, by the following events.

== Births and deaths ==
=== Births ===
- Dafydd ab Hugh
- Fyodor Berezin
- Eric Brown
- Yuli Burkin
- Daína Chaviano
- Brenda Cooper
- Kelley Eskridge
- Neil Gaiman
- Charles E. Gannon
- Nicola Griffith
- Peter F. Hamilton
- Nalo Hopkinson
- Dave Hutchinson
- Emmanuel Jouanne (d. 2008)
- Steven L. Kent
- Ian McDonald
- Linda Nagata
- Philip Palmer
- Kristine Kathryn Rusch
- Robert J. Sawyer
- Roland C. Wagner (d. 2012)
- Don Webb
- Andrzej Ziemiański

=== Deaths ===
- Victor Rousseau Emanuel (b. 1879)
- John Russell Fearn (b. 1908)
- Nevil Shute (b. 1899)
- Eden Phillpotts (b. 1862)
- John Taine (b. 1883) (pseudonym of Eric Temple Bell)

== Literary releases ==
=== Novels ===
- Drunkard's Walk by Frederik Pohl, a professor unravels a conspiracy involving free will and predestination.
- Flesh by Philip José Farmer, space explorers return to a future Earth dominated by a fertility cult.
- The High Crusade by Poul Anderson, medieval knights capture an alien spaceship and embark on interstellar adventures.
- Rogue Moon by Algis Budrys, scientists explore a deadly alien artifact on the Moon, facing existential challenges.
- The Status Civilization by Robert Sheckley, a man navigates a dystopian society where criminals are exiled to a savage world.
- Storm Over Warlock by Andre Norton, a survivor on an alien planet allies with native beings against an alien threat.
- Trouble with Lichen by John Wyndham, a biochemist discovers a lichen that slows aging, leading to societal upheaval.
- Venus Plus X by Theodore Sturgeon, a man encounters a future society with unique views on gender and sexuality.
- Vulcan's Hammer by Philip K. Dick, an AI dictatorship faces rebellion and internal conflict.

=== Short stories ===
- "First Men to the Moon" (novella) by Wernher von Braun

=== Children's books ===
- A Mystery for Mr. Bass by Eleanor Cameron, children solve a mystery on the Mushroom Planet.

== Movies ==
| Title | Director | Cast | Country | Subgenre/Notes |
|---|---|---|---|---|
| 12 to the Moon | David Bradley | Ken Clark, Michi Kobi, Tom Conway | United States | |
| The Amazing Transparent Man | Edgar G. Ulmer | Marguerite Chapman, Douglas Kennedy, James Griffith | United States | Horror |
| Atom Age Vampire (a.k.a. Seddok, l'erede di Satana) | Anton Giulio Majano | Alberto Lupo, Susanne Loret, Sergio Fantoni | Italy | Horror |
| Atomic War Bride (a.k.a. Rat) | Veljko Bulajić | Antun Vrdoljak, Zlatko Madunić, Ljubiša Jovanović | Yugoslavia | Drama Romance |
| Beyond the Time Barrier | Edgar G. Ulmer | Robert Clarke, Darlene Tompkins, Arianne Ulmer | United States | Romance |
| Dinosaurus! | Irvin Yeaworth | Ward Ramsey, Paul Lukather, Kristina Hanson | United States | Adventure Comedy Fantasy Horror |
| The Human Vapor (a.k.a. Gasu ningen dai 1 gô) | Ishirō Honda | Tatsuya Mihashi, Kaoru Yachigusa, Yoshio Tsuchiya | Japan | Crime Thriller |
| Last Woman on Earth | Roger Corman | Betsy Jones-Moreland, Anthony Carbone, Robert Towne | United States | Drama Horror Mystery Romance |
| The Lost World | Irwin Allen | Michael Rennie, Jill St. John, David Hedison | United States | Adventure Fantasy |
| Man in the Moon | Basil Dearden | Kenneth More, Shirley Anne Field, Michael Hordern | United Kingdom | |
| Mistress of the World (a.k.a. Herrin der Welt) | William Dieterle | Martha Hyer, Micheline Presle, Carlos Thompson | West Germany; France; Italy | Adventure Crime |
| The Secret of the Telegian (a.k.a. Densô ningen) | Jun Fukuda | Kōji Tsuruta, Akihiko Hirata, Yoshio Tsuchiya | Japan | Horror |
| The Silent Star (a.k.a. Der schweigende Stern, First Spaceship on Venus, Planet of the Dead, Spaceship Venus Does Not Reply) | Kurt Maetzig | Yoko Tani, Oldřich Lukeš, Ignacy Machowski | East Germany; Poland | |
| Space Men (a.k.a. Assignment Outer Space) | Antonio Margheriti | Rik Van Nutter, Gabriella Farinon, David Montresor | Italy | |
| The Time Machine | George Pal | Rod Taylor, Alan Young, Yvette Mimieux | United Kingdom | Adventure Romance Thriller (Note: Won an Academy Award for Visual Effects.) |
| Village of the Damned | Wolf Rilla | George Sanders, Barbara Shelley | United Kingdom; United States | Horror |
| Visit to a Small Planet | Norman Taurog | Jerry Lewis, Joan Blackman, Earl Holliman | United States | Comedy |

== Awards ==
- Starship Troopers by Robert A. Heinlein won the Hugo Award for Best Novel.

== See also ==
- 1960 in science
