= Time and Mr. Bass =

1967 novel by Eleanor Cameron

- Author: Eleanor Cameron
- Illustrator: Fred H. Meise
- Language: English
- Series: The Mushroom Planet Books
- Genre: Science fiction Children's
- Publisher: Little, Brown and Company
- Publication date: 1967
- Publication place: United States
- Media type: Print (Hardcover)
- Pages: 247 pp
- Preceded by: Jewels from the Moon

Time and Mr. Bass is a 1967 children's science fiction novel by Canadian author Eleanor Cameron. The novel followed The Wonderful Flight to the Mushroom Planet (1954), Stowaway to the Mushroom Planet (1956), Mr. Bass's Planetoid (1958), A Mystery for Mr. Bass (1960), Jewels from the Moon and the Meteor That Couldn't Stay (1964), and was illustrated by Fred H. Meise. It is the concluding installment of her Mushroom Planet series.

== See also ==
- The Wonderful Flight to the Mushroom Planet, the first book in the series
