= Charlotte Sometimes (novel) =

1969 novel by Penelope Farmer

- First edition
- Author: Penelope Farmer
- Illustrator: Chris Connor
- Language: English
- Genre: Children's novel
- Publisher: Chatto & Windus
- Publication date: 1969
- Publication place: United Kingdom
- Media type: Print
- Preceded by: Emma in Winter

Charlotte Sometimes is a children's novel by the English writer Penelope Farmer, published in 1969 in Britain and the United States. It is the third and best-known of three books featuring the Makepeace sisters, Charlotte and Emma, sometimes known as the Aviary Hall books. The story follows a girl starting at boarding school who finds one morning she has travelled mysteriously back more than 40 years and is known as Clare. Charlotte and Clare change places each night, alternating between 1918 and Charlotte's time; although Charlotte and Clare never meet, they communicate through diary notes in an exercise book. The story is written from Charlotte's point of view: the narrative never follows Clare. Charlotte becomes trapped in Clare's time, struggling to maintain her identity.

== Background ==
At the age of 21, Penelope Farmer was contracted for her first collection of short stories, The China People. One story originally intended for it proved too long to include. This was rewritten as the first chapter of The Summer Birds (1962), her first book featuring Charlotte and Emma Makepeace. A second book, Emma in Winter, with Emma as the main character, followed in 1966. Charlotte Sometimes was first published in 1969 by Harcourt in the United States, and by Chatto & Windus in the UK in the same year.

Penelope Farmer arranged many incidents in Charlotte Sometimes ahead of time based on family experiences. She later wrote that Charlotte and Emma were originally based on her mother and her mother's sister as children, having no parents and "having to be everything to each other", one being the responsible one, the other being rather difficult. She wrote, "Emma and Charlotte have grown in their own ways and aren't exactly based on my mother and her sister now, but this is where it started." Penelope Farmer's mother, Penelope Boothby, who was "talkative and unconventional", besides being the inspiration for Emma, also inspired the character of Emily. The boarding school in the novel is set near where Penelope Farmer lived in London, but based on the West Heath Girls' School in Sevenoaks, Kent, which she and her twin sister Judith attended in the 1950s. Elements in the book based on the school include the pillared front door, the glass verandah and the cedar tree, which still stands, as of 2020. Some characters were based on real students of the time. The episode when Charlotte walks onto the glass verandah is based on a real event, when Penelope Farmer climbed on the glass verandah and broke it.

== Plot ==
=== Part one ===
Charlotte arrives at a new boarding school, and is shown around by a prefect named Sarah. Sarah's mother also attended the school. She is to share a room with other girls, Susannah, Elizabeth, Janet, and Vanessa. The next morning she finds herself in the same place, but in the year 1918 – with war still going on. A younger girl called Emily calls Charlotte her sister and addresses her as "Clare". She tries to spend the day in 1918 without being noticed. Each night, Charlotte finds herself swapping between her own time and Clare's time. They must learn to live two different lives. Charlotte and Clare manage to write to each other in Clare's diary, which they share and hide in their bed.

Emily and Clare are supposed to leave their room soon and go into lodgings with the Chisel Brown family. They have to make sure this happens when Clare is in 1918, because they won't be able to switch again after that.

=== Part two ===
Charlotte, expecting to have returned to her own time for the last time, is shocked to find that she has not, and is still in 1918. She will go into lodgings with the Chisel Brown family: it appears she will be trapped in the past. In the house, Miss Agnes Chisel Brown shows Charlotte and Emily the toys she once played with, including toy soldiers and a solitaire board with marbles. She tells the two girls about her brother Arthur, who died in the war. Charlotte reflects, forward and back: to Arthur in the past; her own sister Emma in the future; and Clare, trapped in Charlotte's time. She struggles with her identity, being Charlotte sometimes but Clare at other times.

Charlotte and Emily form a plan to enter the school by night in an attempt to get Charlotte into the bed which will take Charlotte back to her own time. Inside her room, which is now being used as the school sickroom, Charlotte finds the bed is occupied, and thus she cannot return home. She escapes being seen by Nurse Gregory but is seen by another student, Ruth.

Charlotte is not the only one who struggles with identity. Emily tells of the wretchedness of being motherless and unwanted, moving between homes while her father fights in the war. Meanwhile, Charlotte dreams she is fighting to stay as Charlotte. She dreams about Arthur.

A letter arrives for Clare and Emily from their father. Emily does not let Charlotte read it, to the bewilderment of the other girls. Charlotte, thoughtful as always, wonders who Sarah's mother is: perhaps it will be Charlotte herself if she is trapped in 1918?

At night, Charlotte dreams about Arthur again, as a drummer boy, and that she has turned into Agnes. Her crisis of identity comes to a head as she struggles to preserve her identity as Charlotte.

One evening, the Chisel Browns hold a seance in an attempt to speak to Arthur. The girls hide behind the curtains to observe. During the seance, they hear Clare's voice crying out for Emily. Emily cries out, and the two girls are discovered and disciplined. Later, Miss Agnes asks about the voice they heard at the seance – Clare's. She then tells Charlotte and Emily of Arthur's war experiences.

Finally, the Armistice comes. The war is over: people dance and celebrate in the street, and Charlotte and Emily join in, even though it would anger Mr Chisel Brown. In disgrace, Charlotte and Emily are sent back to the school. Miss Agnes gives them the toys as a gift.

=== Part three ===
Ruth recalls her "dream" of seeing Clare whilst in the sickroom. Because of the flu epidemic the students are able to play wild games in the dormitories, and eventually Charlotte is able to sleep in the bed that will return her to her own time.

On arriving back, Charlotte is startled to learn that her roommate Elizabeth had deduced the truth about her swap with Clare. Charlotte wonders about Sarah's mother and what has become of Emily and Clare. At the school, Charlotte sees the elderly Miss Wilkin. Charlotte realises that she had known Miss Wilkin when she was a young teacher in 1918.

One day, Charlotte learns what has become of Emily and Clare through a conversation with Sarah. Sarah's mother is Emily, and Clare died in the flu epidemic after the war. Later, Charlotte and Elizabeth discuss the events Charlotte has experienced. They find the exercise book in one of the legs of the bed, where it has been for forty years. It includes the last letter Charlotte wrote to Clare.

Charlotte receives a package from Emily as an adult. It contains a letter from Emily, and the toys which Miss Agnes had given them over forty years ago. Charlotte places the marbles from the solitaire set in a jar and fills it with water, which the other girls admire. Charlotte feels a sense of personal identity in now having her own decoration to her dresser, yet muses that the marbles belonged to her when she was living the life of another person, namely Clare. The end of term comes, and the boarders leave the school in the school bus, singing rhymes.

== Continuity ==
The first novel featuring Charlotte and Emma Makepeace was The Summer Birds, published in 1962, set in the South Downs in southern England. Charlotte Sometimes begins one year after the events in The Summer Birds after Charlotte has left her small village school, and covers the period of her first term at boarding school. Although Charlotte's year is not explicitly stated in Charlotte Sometimes, several passages suggest that Charlotte's year is 1963, the year after The Summer Birds was written. (Note: While the novel does not state Charlotte's year, it indicates that 14 September was a Saturday in both Charlotte's and Clare's years; that Charlotte travelled back "over forty years"; and that, had Charlotte become trapped in the past and grown up in Clare's place, she would be "a woman of nearly sixty when Emma was still only twelve," with 1963 – the year after The Summer Birds was written – being the only year fitting these descriptions. Although some reviewers have given 1958 as Charlotte's year, being exactly forty years after 1918, the year 1958 is not given in the book.)

While written three years after Emma in Winter (1966) — which was set during Charlotte's second term at boarding school — the events of Charlotte Sometimes occur beforehand, during Charlotte's first term.

Charlotte's sister Emma and their grandfather Elijah do not appear in Charlotte Sometimes, although there are references to them. For example, Charlotte compares Emily with her sister Emma in her own time, and compares the Chisel Brown family home with her own home, Aviary Hall.

Emma in Winter begins during the same Christmas holidays at which Charlotte Sometimes ends, and indicates that Charlotte will stay a week with one of the friends she made at boarding school. Emma in Winter then follows Emma's story while Charlotte returns to boarding school.

== Themes ==
=== Identity ===
While writing Emma in Winter, Farmer was unaware that identity was such a dominant theme in the book. She only realised that when she read Margery Fisher's comments on the book in Growing Point. She had a similar realisation, this time on her own, while writing Charlotte Sometimes. She writes that "halfway through Charlotte Sometimes I realized that I was writing a book about identity. I am a twin, a non-identical one, and apparently one of the chief problems of non-identical twins is always the establishment of a genuine and separate sense of identity. Looking back I can see this has in fact been an obsession with me, since the age of twelve or so at least."

Author David Rees also points out that identity as a major theme. He wrote, "Its most memorable passages are poignant or resigned or concerned with absence, loss, or death.... Its theme is not so much maturing relationships, but identity.... Charlotte begins to wonder, with increasing dismay, if she really is Charlotte: perhaps she has turned into Clare, rather than just substituted for her. This may be an adult fear – the fear of not being everything you and other people have always said you are, the realization that you may be someone totally different."

=== Time travel ===
Charlotte Sometimes continues the theme, begun in Emma in Winter, of time travel into the past. While this is unexplained in Charlotte Sometimes, a theorised explanation appears in Emma in Winter. Emma and Bobby are reading journals in the study of Elijah – Emma and Charlotte's grandfather – in which they find an article theorising about the non-linear nature of time. It describes time as being like a coiled spring, which can be pushed together, so that some moments in time can be very near a moment in another time.

== Reviews ==
Charlotte Sometimes received widespread critical acclaim.

Margery Fisher, in a 1969 review for her children's literature journal Growing Point, wrote, "Like Emma in Winter, this is really a study in disintegration, the study of a girl finding an identity by losing it.... Above all, here is a dream-allegory which teaches not through statement but through feeling. We sense the meaning of Charlotte's changes of identity in the way that she senses them herself.... [It is] a book of quite exceptional distinction... a haunting, convincing story which comes close to being a masterpiece of its kind...."

Children's novelist Eleanor Cameron wrote, "Farmer writes with style. She is vivid in her depiction of place: on almost every page, scattered with colourful figures of speech, we are drawn into the school and the surroundings of the school through sights and sounds and smells and textures... above all we are moved by the depth and poignancy of the relationship between Charlotte and Emily." She continues, "Farmer is always gifted in her grasp of possibilities that bring us up short with surprise and delight and satisfaction."

Neil Millar in The Christian Science Monitor wrote, "Charlotte Sometimes is a book of quite exceptional distinction.... The book is essentially about humanity caught up in the still trickery of time.... Not easily forgotten."

In 1969, The Sunday Times described the book as "this year's most haunting fantasy".

Children's publisher Margaret K. McElderry wrote, "[Charlotte Sometimes] is a fascinating exploration of the fragile barriers between layers of time, handled with great skill in the writing and delicacy of perception.

The British children's author David Rees wrote in 1980 of how "the book is none the worse for breaking the conventional bounds of the children's novel. It is probably Penelope Farmer's finest novel – complex, taut, not a word wrong – and it thoroughly deserves the popularity it has attained."

Peggy Heeks writes in Twentieth-Century Children's Writers that Charlotte Sometimes "shows a brilliant handling of the time-switch technique and a sincerity which rejects slick solutions to the dilemmas of the two heroines."

Writer Hannah Gersen, in a review for The Millions, wrote, "The book is good, really good.... I can see why this novel inspired The Cure. It's a somewhat gloomy book, an eerie story about childhood, identity, loneliness, and death. At the same time, it has all the pleasures of a good time-travel yarn." Gersen continues, "Adolescence is all about forging an identity, and this novel speaks to those questions of “who am I?” and “how do other people see me?” in an abstract, haunting way."

== Editions ==
Two versions of the novel exist. A revised edition published by Dell in 1985 has a number of changes made by the author. Almost all the revisions were minor, such as modernisation of vocabulary and punctuation, and minor re-wording of some sentences. The only large change is that a few events in the last chapter of the story were removed. These include a poignant episode where Charlotte, back in her own time, receives a package and a letter from Clare's sister, Emily, as an adult. Also removed is the original ending, in which the end of term comes and the boarders ride away in the school bus, Charlotte among them, heading home to Aviary Hall. The 1985 edition ends with Charlotte and Elizabeth finding Clare's exercise book, hidden in the leg of the bed for over forty years.

The original 1969 text of the book was re-published by The New York Review Children's Collection in 2007.

== Influence, adaptations and similar novels ==
=== Audio and television adaptations ===
The BBC One children's television programme Jackanory featured Charlotte Sometimes as a five-part abridged, serialised reading in January 1974, read by Rosalie Crutchley. Daphne Jones adapted the text as a serial, and the programme featured photographs by Jimmy Matthews Joyce. The executive producer was Anna Home.

BBC Radio 4 aired an abridged reading of the novel, read by Deborah Findlay, in July–August 1994. The seven-part abridged version was created by Hilary Brand, with the Sally Avens as the producer.

In 1993, Chivers Children's Audio Books released an adaptation of Charlotte Sometimes on audio cassette.

=== Influence ===
In 1980, British writer David Rees published The Marble in the Water, a collection of essays on British and US children's literature. Its title comes from the eighth chapter of part 2 of Charlotte Sometimes. When Charlotte observes the marbles placed by Emily in a jar of water, she notes how big they look in the water, yet ordinary when taken out: "But when she put her fingers into the water and pulled a marble out, it was small by comparison with those still in the glass, and unimportant too" (p. 157).

In 1981, a single entitled "Charlotte Sometimes" was released by English band The Cure. Its lyrics concern Charlotte, the novel's central character. They refer to the opening paragraphs: "By bedtime all the faces, the voices had blurred for Charlotte to one face, one voice.... The light seemed too bright for them, glaring on white walls.", and to several events near the end of the book: people dancing in the streets at Armistice; and a school walk when Charlotte cries upon hearing of Clare's fate. The title of the single's B-side, "Splintered in Her Head", was also taken from a line in the novel. The Cure later released another song based on the novel, "The Empty World", on their 1984 album The Top. In 2002 the film-maker Eric Byler released a film entitled Charlotte Sometimes. Its storyline is unrelated to Penelope Farmer's novel, although its title comes from the song by The Cure, based on the novel.

In 2007, Penelope Farmer herself wrote another novel, Lifting the World, in which a high school student writes a story in class with a similar premise to Charlotte Sometimes. In his story, the student went to sleep and woke up in the same house, but one hundred years earlier. The inhabitants of the house looked at him strangely, asking him what he was doing there, and where he came from, and drove him out of the house.

"Charlotte Sometimes" was formerly used as a stage name by the American singer-songwriter Jessica Charlotte Poland.

=== Similar novels of the period ===
Other similar novels of the period include Jessamy (1967) by Barbara Sleigh. In Jessamy, written in a matter-of-fact style, a young girl experiences a time-slip, with the narrative switching between World War I and the present day. In both novels, people, places and items which were seen in the past show up again in the present day narrative.
