= Emma in Winter =

1966 novel by Penelope Farmer

- Emma in Winter first edition (UK) cover, illustrated by Laszlo Acs
- Author: Penelope Farmer
- Illustrator: Laszlo Acs (Chatto & Windus edition); James J. Spanfeller (Harcourt edition)
- Cover artist: Laszlo Acs (Chatto & Windus edition); James J. Spanfeller (Harcourt edition)
- Language: English
- Genre: Children's novel
- Publisher: Chatto & Windus (UK); Harcourt (USA)
- Publication date: 1966
- Publication place: United Kingdom
- Media type: Print
- Pages: 160 pp (Chatto & Windus first edition, hardback)
- ISBN: 0-7011-0105-9 (Chatto & Windus first edition, hardback)
- Preceded by: The Summer Birds
- Followed by: Charlotte Sometimes

Emma in Winter is a children's novel by British writer Penelope Farmer, published in 1966 by Chatto & Windus in the UK, and by Harcourt in the USA. It is the second of three books featuring the Makepeace sisters, Charlotte and Emma, These three books are sometimes known as the Aviary Hall books.

== Background ==
At the age of twenty-one, Penelope Farmer was contracted for her first collection of short stories, The China People. One story originally intended for this collection proved too long to include. This was rewritten as the first chapter of The Summer Birds (1962), her first book featuring Charlotte and Emma Makepeace. The Summer Birds received a Carnegie Medal commendation in 1963. A second book, Emma in Winter, set roughly two years later, with Emma as the main character followed in 1966. The main settings of both these books are a small village school in the South Downs in southern England, and Aviary Hall, the girls' home. Charlotte Sometimes followed in 1969, set slightly before the events of Emma in Winter, which is about Charlotte's first term in a London boarding school.

According to Farmer, Charlotte and Emma, who grow up in their Grandfather Elijah's house, were originally based on her mother and her mother's sister as children, having no parents and "…having to be everything to each other," one being the responsible one, the other being rather difficult.

Penelope Farmer stated that while writing Emma in Winter, she did not realise identity was such a predominant theme in the novel until she encountered Margery Fisher's comments about the book in Growing Point. She had a similar realisation, this time on her own, while writing Charlotte Sometimes.

Emma in Winter is dedicated to Judy (1939‒1991), Penelope Farmer's older twin sister.

== Plot summary ==
It is wintertime. Emma's older sister Charlotte leaves Aviary Hall to stay with a schoolfriend, and then to return to her second term at her London boarding school. Emma and her classmate Bobby Fumpkins simultaneously begin a series of dreams of being able to fly again, like they could in The Summer Birds. Bobby, being fat, is consistently teased by his classmates. Emma is also initially hostile towards Bobby, but realises that not only does Bobby appear in these dreams, he is also having the same dreams. As the two oldest children in the school, Bobby and Emma are appointed head boy and head girl.

In the dreams, they fly over their village and the South Downs, with the North Downs and the sea visible in the distance. They are observed and shadowed by an evil presence, initially appearing as a pair of eyes watching them. Strangely, the trees in their dreams consistently shrink downwards into the ground. Bobby realises that in their dreams, they are being dragged backwards in time. In successive dreams, they travel further and further back in time, visiting the Ice Age and seeing a mammoth, and a distant prehistoric era where they notice a monstrous dinosaur. They speculate if they will eventually arrive at the beginning of the world, and if they will see the Garden of Eden.

Eventually, in their final dream, Emma and Bobby are dragged back to the beginning of the world. They stand on a rocky shore facing the sea, and are confronted by the evil being, revealed as a grotesque, distorted form of their teacher, Miss Hallibutt. The being threatens to consume them by taking away their thoughts of reality. After transforming itself into replicas of Emma and Bobby themselves, its attempts are defeated by the two children being able to concentrate on reality and of their home and their school. The children are jerked out of the dream world and return to reality.

As term draws to a close, the thaw comes, and the children at school react with great joy. Emma realises that Charlotte will soon return home after her second term at the boarding school. Bobby and Emma walk home, with the children knowing they will not return to the dream world. As Bobby runs up the laneway to his home, Emma calls out to him, "Pleasant dreams, Bob, pleasant dreams!"

== Continuity ==
Emma in Winter features the same village school setting as The Summer Birds. It is set around a year and a half after the events of The Summer Birds, and follows soon after the events of Charlotte Sometimes. Charlotte has left their small village school, and is now in her second term at boarding school. While in the absence of the mysterious birdboy, the children are not able to fly, in Emma and Bobby's dreams, they retain this ability.

Emma in Winter gives some explanation for the time travel phenomenon seen in both this book and in Charlotte Sometimes. Emma and Bobby sneak into Grandfather Elijah's study, and read an article where time is described as being like a coiled spring, which can be pushed together, so that some moments in time can be very near a moment in another time.

The book continues a theme introduced in The Summer Birds in referencing the beginning of the world. The Summer Birds has the description, "The next morning the sun caught sparkle on every leaf and the air smelled fresh and wet¬–it was like the beginning of the world morning." In Emma in Winter, Emma and Bobby in their shared dream adventure, would wonder if they will see the Garden of Eden, with the two later travelling back in time to the beginning of the world.

== Reviews ==
Children's literary critic Margery Fisher reviewed Emma in Winter in her journal, Growing Point, writing that it "uncovers the subconscious a little and gives tangible form to the emotions of children in a dream-sequence brilliantly sustained in the author's elegant, rhythmic style." She writes that it is not a book for everyone, but "for some it may become a key to more than just a story."

Amy Kellman reviewed Emma in Winter in Library Journal, writing that "Miss Farmer has a gift for creating character and mood, with the natural setting of a small English village or the larger world of the dreams. The book won't appeal immediately to the child looking for a fast-moving plot, but all children should have a chance at it."

The book review publication, Virginia Kirkus' Service reviewed the novel in 1966, writing, "In Emma in Winter the focus is narrow, the development internal. The author displays her usual wizardry at evoking sensations, but youngsters are likely to become impatient with the psychological and psychic unravelling of Emma and Bobby long before the end."

The Junior Bookshelf had a less positive view of the book, opining that admirers of The Summer Birds will almost certainly be disappointed. It writes that the author's use of dreams is "a clever idea but not very carefully worked out. Why does the dream always start at the point at which it last left off? Dreams do not usually behave like that." The review continues, "It is an anticlimax when the menacing presence of the early dreams resolves into a stupid caricature of the children's teacher, just at a time when their dream experience should have been at its most terrifying."

Mary Hill Arbuthnot and Zena Sutherland reviewed Emma in Winter, along with the other books in the series, The Summer Birds and Charlotte Sometimes. They write of the three books that, "…the style is smooth, the mood subdued, and the characterization perceptive…"

Writer and psychologist Hugh Crago reviewed the trilogy in Signal. He writes that its unpredictability and its unanswered questions are marks of Farmer's success. "This magic [...] is in itself a wholly satisfying symbol for the unconscious mind – and the more satisfying for not being explained as such." He continues, "Emma in Winter is charged with a sense of the enormous stature of emotions, which dwarf the humans who have them in a most frightening way."

Crago writes that the unpretentiousness of Emma in Winter in one sense, "...seems the culmination of the Penelope Farmer's work. It maintains a subtle tension between control and chaos that she has never repeated."

== Editions ==
1st edition (UK), 160pp, illustrated by Laszlo Acs. London: Chatto & Windus, 1966, second impression 1974. ISBN 0-7011-0105-9

1st edition (USA), 160pp, illustrated by James J. Spanfeller. New York: Harcourt, Brace & World, 1966. OCLC Number: 301330

Reprint. New York: Dell Yearling, 1987.
