= Whichford House =

House in Warwickshire, England

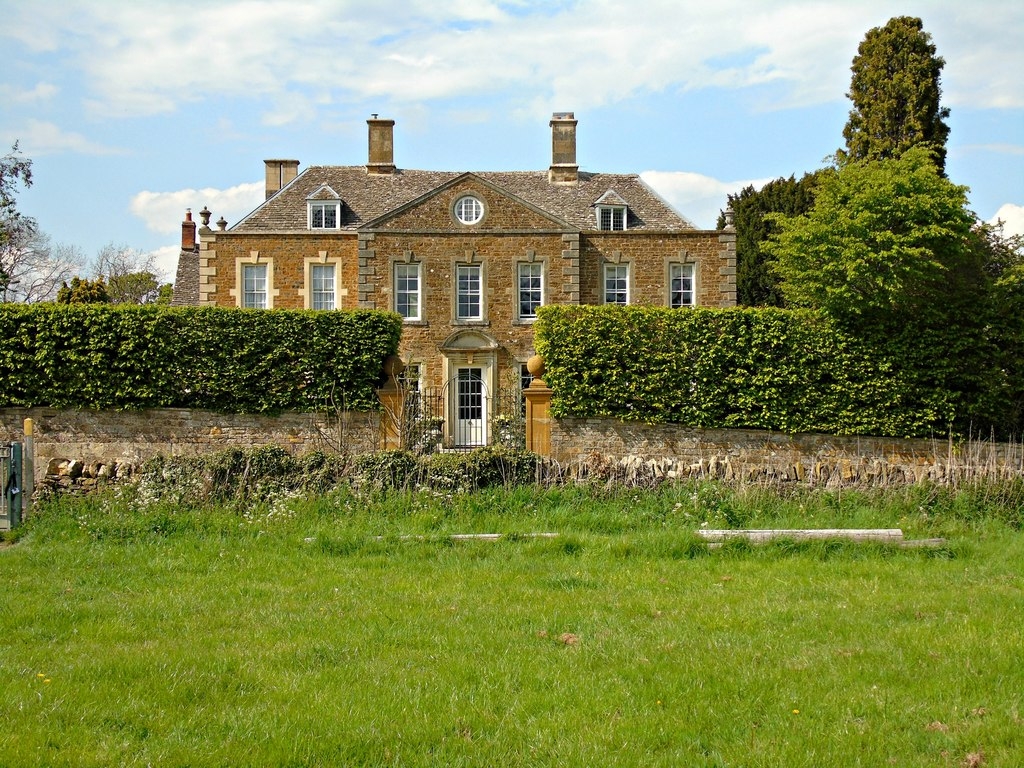
- The south front of Whichford House
- Interactive map of Whichford House
- 52.00940°N 1.54609°W
- Location: Ascott Road, Whichford, Warwickshire, England

Site notes
- Architectural style: Georgian with earlier elements

Listed Building – Grade II*
- Official name: Whichford House and attached balustrades
- Designated: 20 January 1967
- Reference no.: 1116069

Whichford House is a Grade II* listed Georgian country house situated in the village of Whichford, Warwickshire, England. Described by historians as "the finest rectory in the Cotswolds", the house exemplifies the architectural evolution of English domestic buildings across four centuries, blending 17-century origins with grand Georgian design. It is also noted for formal gardens originally laid out by landscape architect James Russell and later revived by Judith Sharpe.

== Location ==
Whichford House stands just north of Chipping Norton and shares the limestone vernacular and landscape of the Cotswolds. It lies immediately east of St Michael’s Church, overlooking a steep valley and distant Brailes Hill.

== History ==
=== Early rectory ===
Fabric bearing the date 1662 survives from the original west range, indicating a substantial parsonage by the mid-17th century.

=== Georgian expansion (c. 1730) ===
Rector John Ingram embarked on a major enlargement about 1730, intending a seven-bay classical house; only five bays were completed before he left the parish in 1747. Interiors feature a grand stair with Corinthian cornice, marble chimney-piece carved with grape clusters, and niche cupboards with pediments.

=== 19th–20th century alterations ===
Rev. Richard Broome Pillinge appended a modest south-west wing c. 1840, later judged structurally unsound and aesthetically inferior. In 1954 the Church sold the rectory to publisher George Rainbird, who, with James Russell, transformed the grounds. Major John Waddington Oakes (owner 1983–2004) amalgamated reception rooms to create a vast central hall.

=== 21st century ===
A sympathetic new west wing, completed 2006, finally restored the Georgian symmetry envisioned in 1730. Private owners since 2024 have begun further conservation and sustainability works.

== Architecture ==
The house combines:

- 17th-century range – marlstone rubble, chamfered beams, blocked hall hearth.
- Georgian south front – five-bay ashlar façade, central pediment, sash windows, refined joinery.
- 2006 west wing – architecturally matched to complete the "classical composition".

== Gardens ==
Rainbird’s commission to James Russell produced a celebrated axial scheme: a paved terrace and herbaceous borders directing the view to Brailes Hill. Country Life praised the "cool classicism" of Russell’s design and noted that "the shades of Russell and Rainbird still inhabit, but their work has been rejuvenated" after restoration by Simon & Bridget Herrtage with designer Judith Sharpe.

Key features include a Russell parterre, white-gravel court, orangery and woodland edge plantings. The gardens open for charity under the National Gardens Scheme.

== Notable residents ==
- Rev. John Ingram – rector and patron of the Georgian works (1722–1752)
- George Rainbird – publisher; garden patron (owner 1954–1983)
- Major John Waddington Oakes – High Sheriff of Warwickshire (1980s–2000s)

== Heritage status ==
Listed Grade II* on 20 January 1967 for exceptional architectural and historic interest.

== See also ==
- James Russell (garden designer)
- Georgian architecture
- Cotswolds
