= The Wonderful Flight to the Mushroom Planet =

1954 children's novel by Eleanor Cameron

- Front cover of the first edition
- Author: Eleanor Cameron
- Illustrator: Robert Henneberger
- Cover artist: Henneberger
- Series: Mushroom Planet
- Genre: Science fiction, children's literature
- Publisher: Little, Brown and Company (Atlantic Monthly Press)
- Publication date: September 1954
- Publication place: Canada
- Media type: Print (hardcover)
- Pages: 214
- OCLC: 166449
- LC Class: PZ7.C143 Wo
- Followed by: Stowaway to the Mushroom Planet

The Wonderful Flight to the Mushroom Planet is a children's science fiction novel written by Eleanor Cameron, illustrated by Robert Henneberger, and published by Little, Brown in 1954. It is set in Pacific Grove, California, and on Basidium, a tiny habitable moon of Earth, invisible from the planet in its orbit 50,000 miles away. The "Mushroom Planet", visited by the protagonists David Topman and Chuck Masterson, is covered in various types of mushrooms and is populated by little green people who are in a state of distress.

The Wonderful Flight was published under the Atlantic Monthly Press imprint of Little, Brown in September 1954, and it received a starred review from Kirkus Reviews. The Wonderful Flight to the Mushroom Planet proved very popular, spawning four sequels and two short stories over the following 13 years.

== Plot summary ==
When two boys find an ad in a newspaper asking for two young boys to build a spaceship, they quickly construct one out of old tin and scrap wood (including the hull of a derelict rowboat), and bring it to the advertiser. This man is the mysterious Mr. Tyco Bass, an inventor and scientist. Using his marvelous stroboscopic polarizing filter he shows the boys a previously undetected satellite of the Earth, which he calls Basidium-X. He refits their spaceship, giving them some special fuel he invented to power it, and tells them to fly to the mushroom planet (after getting their parents' permission). He warns them that their trip will only be successful if they bring a mascot.

When it is time for launch, they grab David's hen, Mrs. Pennyfeather, at the last moment for a mascot, and rocket into space. They find the planet of Basidium to be a small, verdant world covered in soft moss and tree-size mushrooms. They quickly meet some residents of the mushroom planet, small men with large heads and slightly green skin, of the same people as the mysterious Mr. Bass. They tell the boys that their planet has had a crisis and that everyone is slowly dying of a mysterious sickness. The boys meet up with the king of the planet, the Great Ta, and end up solving the natives' problem before returning to Earth.

== Series ==
Cameron followed up with five sequels.

- Stowaway to the Mushroom Planet (1956)
- Mr. Bass's Planetoid (1958)
- A Mystery for Mr. Bass (1960)
- Jewels from the Moon and the Meteor That Couldn't Stay (1964)
- Time and Mr. Bass (1967)

== Other editions ==
- Viaje Maravilloso Al Planeta de los Hongos (1965), Spanish language edition
- Scholastic (1966), paperback
- Joy Street / Little, Brown (1988), paperback; cover by Peter Sís
- Little, Brown (1998); cover by Kevin Hawkes
- Little, Brown (2003); cover by Steve Vance

== See also ==
- 1954 in science fiction
- Little green men
