= Rowland Hilder =

British marine, landscape artist, illustrator (1905–1993)

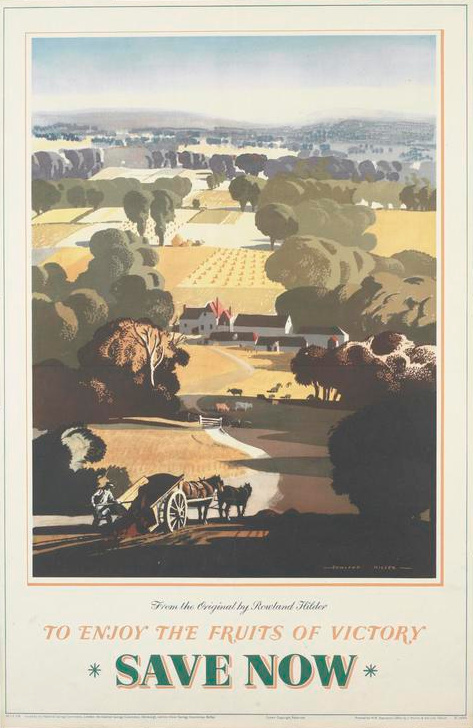
"To Enjoy the Fruits of Victory - Save Now"; poster for HMSO

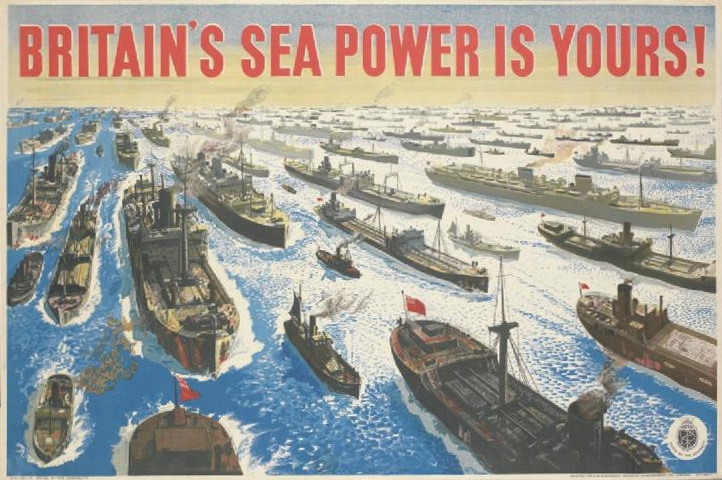
"Britain's Sea Power is Yours!" a Second World War poster for the Admiralty

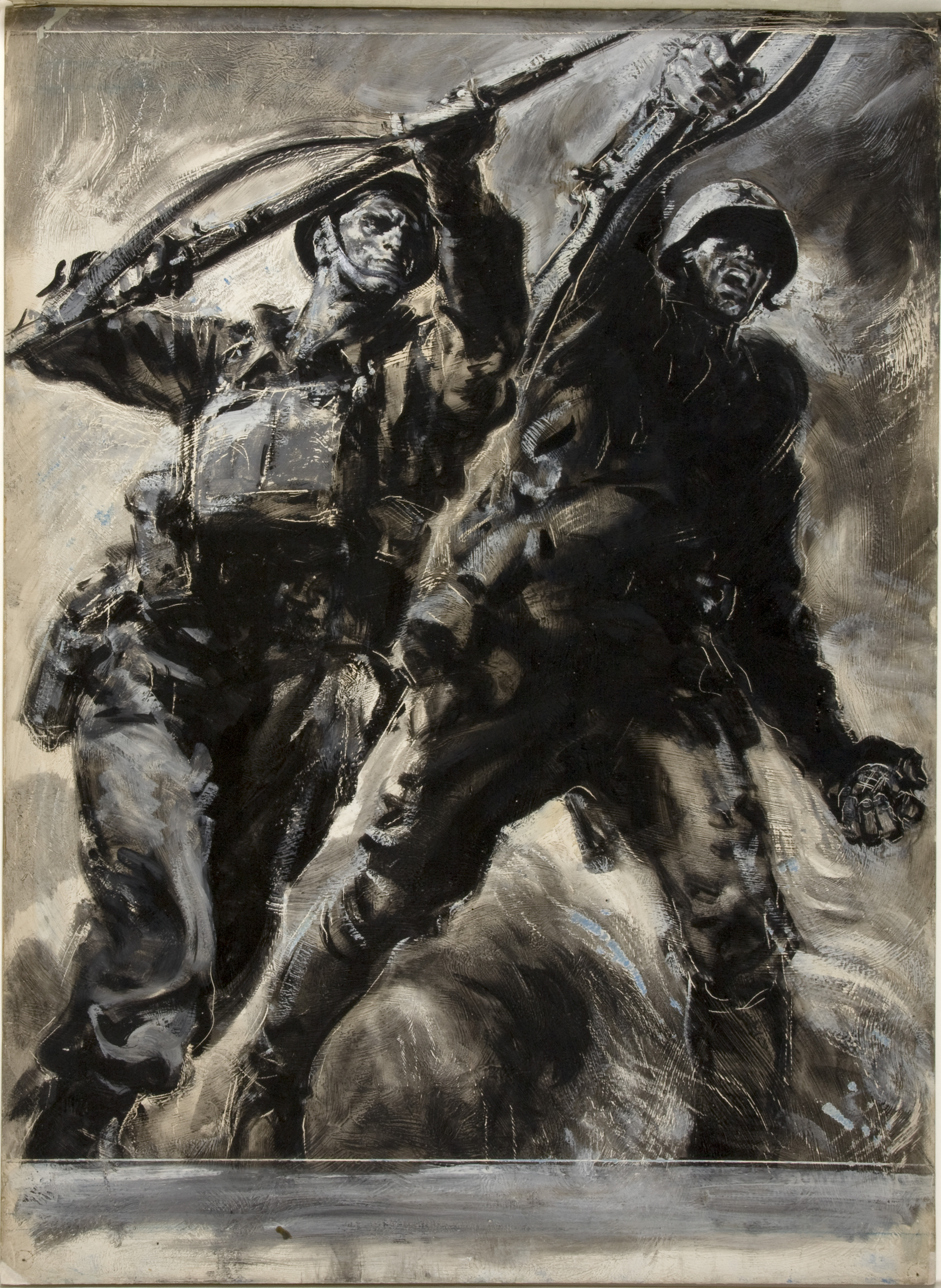
A Hilder picture from the Second World War

Rowland Frederick Hilder OBE (28 June 1905 – 21 April 1993) was an English landscape artist and book illustrator.

== Early life ==
He was born in New York to Roland and Kitty Hilder (née Fissenden). Following the outbreak of the First World War, Hilder's English father decided in 1915 to return to his native county of Kent, England, to enlist in the army.

Hilder studied at Goldsmiths' College, in south London where he met botanical artist Edith Blenkiron (1903-1992). They married and had two children. As a student with little money he cycled into Kent and discovered the Shoreham Valley in the North Downs where he sketched the same barn drawn by the painter Samuel Palmer in the 1820s. This interest in the countryside began a lifelong passion for drawing landscapes in both pencil and watercolour, initially of Kent, "the Garden of England", and the Thames with its sailing vessels and old buildings.

== Career ==
Hilder was commissioned by Oxford University Press to illustrate books. He was awarded the Times Illustrator award for his end papers and monochrome drawings of Stevenson's Treasure Island in 1929. In the 1930s he illustrated several books. In 1929 Hilder was commissioned by Shell Mex Ltd to illustrate "Then and Now", a travel guide which started a long relationship with the company with posters sponsored by them. In 1953 when asked by the publisher George Rainbird to provide background landscapes to a series of wildflowers by another artist, Hilder showed him pictures of flowers by his wife Edith. Rainbird then commissioned them both to create the Shell "Flowers of the Countryside" series. Demand was so great that Shell set up an office to deal with correspondence and 13 million plates were published.

He was also a cover artist for Radio Times and, together with Edith, illustrated the Ladybird Book of British Wild Flowers published in 1957.

He was an army camouflage officer during the Second World War and then became a mainstay of the Ministry of Information.

Hilder served as President of the Royal Institute of Painters in Watercolours from 1964 to 1974. He was awarded an OBE in 1986.

== Influence ==
He has been called 'the Turner of his generation', and according to the Dictionary of National Biography 'The description "Rowland Hilder country" (attached primarily to the weald of Kent) evokes a landscape as distinctive and personal as "Constable's country" along the Suffolk Stour.'
