= Penelope Farmer =

English children's writer, born 1939

Penelope Jane Farmer (born 1939) is an English fiction writer well known for children's fantasy novels. Her best-known novel is Charlotte Sometimes (1969), a boarding-school story that features a multiple time slip.

== Life ==
Farmer was born a fraternal twin in Westerham, Kent, on 14 June 1939, as the third child of Hugh Robert MacDonald (died 26 May 2004) and Penelope Boothby Farmer. Her parents and hospital staff were unaware of her existence until some 25 minutes after the birth of her twin sister Judith. Throughout Farmer's life, twinship has been a defining element in her understanding of her identity. The importance of Farmer's relationship with her twin sister Judith was reflected in her books, having published Two, or: The Book of Twins and Doubles in 1996, and Sisters: An Anthology in 1999. The twins have an older brother, Tim, and a younger sister, Sally.

After attending a boarding school, she read history at St Anne's College, Oxford and did postgraduate work at Bedford College, University of London.

She visited South Africa in 1994, talking with people about their views on the election. She later wrote an article about this, published in the Index on Censorship.

In 2000, Farmer published an article about the challenges facing the Hong Kong Chinese community in the UK.

According to Penelope Farmer's personal blog site, she was in 2012 living on Lanzarote in the Canary Islands. She there described herself as "a writer – published for many years, now struggling", and listed "her grandchildren" among those she loved and missed. Other relations were mentioned: the departure of her daughter and a granddaughter (23 April 2004). The 22 April 2010 entry states that her son was among those staying with her, with his daughters aged eight and twelve.

== Writing career ==
Farmer's first publication was The China People, a collection of literary fairy tales for young people, in 1960. One story written for this collection was judged too long to include. This was re-written as the first chapter of her first novel for children, The Summer Birds. In 1963, this received a Carnegie Medal commendation and was cited as an American Library Association Notable Book. The Summer Birds was soon followed by its sequels, Emma in Winter (1966) and Charlotte Sometimes (1969), and by A Castle of Bone (1972), Year King (1977), Thicker than Water (1989), Penelope: A Novel (1993), and Granny and Me (1998).

Farmer stated that she, while writing Emma in Winter, did not realize that identity was such a predominant theme in the novel until she encountered Margery Fisher's comments on the book. She had a similar realization, this time on her own, while writing Charlotte Sometimes.

== Works ==
- The China People (1960)
- The Summer Birds (1962)
- The Magic Stone (1964)
- Emma in Winter (1966) – sequel
- Sea Gull (1966)
- Charlotte Sometimes (1969) – sequel
- Serpent's Teeth: The Story of Cadmus (1971)
- Dragonfly summer (1971)
- Daedalus and Icarus (1971)
- Story of Persephone (1972)
- A Castle of Bone (1972)
- William and Mary (1974)
- August the Fourth (1975)
- Heracles (1975)
- Year King (1977)
- Beginnings: Creation Myths of the World (1978)
- Standing in the Shadow (1984)
- Away from Home (1987)
- Eve: Her Story (1988)
- Glasshouses (1989)
- Snakes and Ladders (1993)
- Thicker Than Water (1993)
- Two, or: The Book of Twins and Doubles (1996)
- Penelope: A Novel (1996)
- Sisters: An Anthology (1999)
- Virago Book of Grandmothers (2000)
- Goodnight Ophelia (2015)
