= Edith Hilder =

Flower artist (1904–1922)

Edith Hilder (1904–1992) was a flower artist who painted in watercolour, illustrated books, and decorated fabric and pottery. Her work appeared at the Royal Academy and at annual exhibitions of the Royal Society of Painters in Watercolours. She was notable as a painter in her own right as well as in collaboration with her American-born husband, Rowland Hilder, with whom she worked on many projects including Shell guides and a popular Ladybird book.

== Life and career ==
Edith Hilder was born Edith Blenkiron on November 11, 1904, the daughter of a boot and shoe buyer. She studied art at Goldsmith’s college, London where she met fellow student and future husband, Rowland Hilder. He had received a commission to work on books by Mary Webb including a new version of ‘Precious Bane’, a best seller, published in 1924. Edith travelled with Rowland and his mother to Shropshire to study winter scenes for a set of illustrations for the commission. In 1929, the couple married and went on to have one son, Anthony born in 1936, also a painter, and a daughter, Mary.

From the 1920’s to the 1950s, Shell oil commissioned the Hilders to produce an illustrated Guide to the Flowers of the Countryside (1955), a popular series of advertisements, and the Shell Guide to Kent (1958), the first in a series of volumes devoted to English counties. The combination of their differing styles, Edith's botanically accurate watercolours and Rowland’s looser landscape backgrounds, proved popular and were serialized in the leading colour magazines of the time. After the Second World War, the couple set up a family business, The Heron Press, which printed greeting cards depicting scenes that became known as ‘Hilderscapes’. In 1955, a selection of Edith’s paintings for the Shell guide was published in book form with descriptions by Geoffrey Grigson. Edith's work appeared at the Royal Academy and at the annually held exhibitions of the Royal Society of Painters in Watercolours. These combined with the publications established her as a notable painter.

In 1957, British Wild Flowers, a Ladybird nature book containing the couple’s work was published. A second book on garden flowers was offered as a commission to the couple. Edith was keen to undertake the commission but Rowland declined, feeling it would detract from his reputation as a serious artist. Sketching and Painting Indoors, another collaboration between the married couple also came out in 1957. In the late 1950’s, the couple put together a joint exhibition, which went on to success in the United States of America. In 1963, Edith published Drawing Wild Flowers with Studio Drawing Books. The Hilders lived for many years in Blackheath, London. Edith died in 1992 and Rowland just nine months later.
