= Eleanor Cameron =

Canadian-American children's author and critic (1912–1996)

- Cameron and Leonard Wibberley in 1965
- Born: Eleanor Frances Butler; March 23, 1912; Winnipeg, Manitoba, Canada
- Died: October 11, 1996 (aged 84); Monterey, California, U.S.
- Occupations: Writer, librarian
- Writing career
- Period: 1950–1996
- Genre: Children's literature

Eleanor Frances (Butler) Cameron (March 23, 1912 – October 11, 1996) was a children's author and critic. She published 20 books in her lifetime, including The Wonderful Flight to the Mushroom Planet (1954) and its sequels, a collection of critical essays called The Green and Burning Tree (1969), and The Court of the Stone Children (1973), which won the U.S. National Book Award in category Children's Books.

== Biography ==
Cameron was born in Winnipeg, Manitoba, in Canada on March 23, 1912. Her family moved to South Charleston, Ohio when she was three years old, and then to Berkeley, California, when she was six. A few years later, her parents divorced. At age 16, she moved with her mother and stepfather to Los Angeles. Cameron studied at UCLA and the Art Center School of Los Angeles. She joined the Los Angeles Public Library in 1930 and later worked as a research librarian for the Los Angeles Board of Education and two different advertising companies. She married Ian Cameron, a printmaker and publisher, in 1934 and the couple had a son, David, in 1944.

Cameron's first published book, The Unheard Music (1950), was partially based on her experience as a librarian and was positively received by critics, though it didn't sell particularly well. Cameron did not turn to writing children's books until eight-year-old David asked her to write a space story featuring him as the main character. That book, The Wonderful Flight to the Mushroom Planet (1954), proved to be very popular, spawning four sequels and two short stories over the following 13 years.

With the success of the Mushroom Planet books, Cameron focused on writing for children. Between 1959 and 1988 she produced 12 additional children's novels, including The Court of the Stone Children (1973) and the semi-autobiographical five book Julia Redfern series (1971–1988).

In addition to her fiction work, Cameron wrote two books of criticism and reflection on children's literature. The first, The Green and Burning Tree, was released in 1969 and led to an increased profile for Cameron in the world of children's literature. Throughout the 1970s, 1980s, and early 1990s Cameron worked as a traveling speaker and contributor to publications such as The Horn Book Magazine, Wilson Library Bulletin, and Children's Literature in Education. She was also a member of the founding editorial board for the children's magazine Cricket, which debuted in 1973. Her second book of essays, The Seed and the Vision: On the Writing and Appreciation of Children's Books, came out in 1993. It is her final published book.

From late 1967 until her death, Cameron made her home in Pebble Beach, California. She died in hospice in Monterey, California, on October 11, 1996, at the age of 84.

== Charlie and the Chocolate Factory controversy ==
From October 1972 to October 1973 a controversy started by Cameron concerning Roald Dahl's Charlie and the Chocolate Factory embroiled the pages of The Horn Book Magazine. In a three-part essay entitled "McLuhan, Youth and Literature" Cameron criticized the controversial theories of media theorist Marshall McLuhan. In part one she described Dahl's book as "one of the most tasteless books ever written for children" and described it as "sadistic" and "phony". She was especially chagrined by its use as a classroom read-aloud. Dahl replied in the February 1973 issue of Horn Book. He wrote that Cameron was entitled to her opinion about his book, but that she had attacked his character as well. He also scoffed at her recommendation that teachers find better literature to share with their students: "I would dearly like to see Ms. Cameron trying to read Little Women, or Robinson Crusoe for that matter to a class of today's children. This lady is completely out of touch with reality. She would be howled out of the classroom."

Elsewhere in her essay, Cameron decried the Oompa-Loompas, who were portrayed as abused, half-naked, African pygmy slaves. The pictures and descriptions of the Oompa-Loompas in Charlie were revised by Dahl and his publisher Knopf for the 1973 edition to make the characters into dwarves from Loompaland, whom Willy Wonka adores. The brief amount of time between the criticism and the publication of the revised edition of Charlie makes it likely that the changes had already been put in motion by the time the essay was published.

== Legacy ==
Beside winning the National Book Award for Young People's Literature, Cameron's won the 1972 Boston Globe–Horn Book Award for A Room Made of Windows, was one National Book Award runner-up in 1976 for To the Green Mountains, and received the Kerlan Award in 1985 for her body of work.

Since 1992 Super-Con-Duck-Tivity has presented the Eleanor Cameron Award for Middle Grades, one of its three annual Golden Duck Awards for Excellence in Children's Science Fiction, to the author of an English-language novel written for elementary school children (grades 2 to 6). It is funded largely by DucKon, a yearly science fiction convention in the Chicago region.

== Bibliography ==
=== Fiction ===
==== Mushroom Planet series ====
- The Wonderful Flight to the Mushroom Planet (1954)
- Stowaway to the Mushroom Planet (1956)
- Mr. Bass's Planetoid (1958)
- A Mystery for Mr. Bass (1960)
- Jewels from the Moon and the Meteor That Couldn't Stay (1964)
- Time and Mr. Bass (1967)

==== Julia Redfern ====
- A Room Made of Windows (1971)
- Julia and the Hand of God (1977)
- That Julia Redfern (1982)
- Julia's Magic (1984)
- The Private Worlds of Julia Redfern (1988)

==== Redwood Cove ====
- The Terrible Churnadryne (1959)
- The Mysterious Christmas Shell (1961)

==== Stand-alone adult novel ====
- The Unheard Music (1950)

==== Stand-alone children's novels ====
- The Beast with the Magical Horn (1963)
- A Spell is Cast (1964)
- The Court of the Stone Children (1973)
- To the Green Mountains (1975)
- Beyond Silence (1980)

=== Nonfiction ===
==== Books ====
- The Green and Burning Tree: On the Writing and Enjoyment of Children's Books (1969)
- The Seed and the Vision: On the Writing and Appreciation of Children's Books (1993)

==== Articles, essays, and reviews ====
- "Write a Story for Me!" Wilson Library Bulletin 31: 8 (April 1957)
- "The Unforgettable Glimpse". Wilson Library Bulletin 37 (Oct 1962)
- "Unicorn". [poem] Horn Book 39 (Oct 1963)
- "Of Style and the Stylist". Horn Book 40 (Feb 1964)
- "The Dearest Freshness Deep Down Things". Horn Book 40 (Oct 1964)
- "Why Not for Children?" Horn Book 42 (Feb 1966)
- "The Owl Service: A Study". Wilson Library Bulletin 44: 4 (Dec 1969)
- "The Art of Elizabeth Enright". Horn Book 45 (Dec 1969) and 46 (Feb 1970)
- "The Power of Private Vision". San Francisco Sunday Examiner & Chronicle circa November 1970
- "The First Four Years by Laura Ingalls Wilder". The New York Times Book Review, March 28, 1971
- "High Fantasy: A Wizard of Earthsea". Horn Book 47 (April 1971)
- "Cameron Books Based on Pacific Grove". The Pacific Grove Tribune and Pebble Beach Green Sheet, March 17, 1971
- "At Her Back She Always Heard: A Sound of Chariots by Mollie Hunter". The New York Times Book Review, November 5, 1972
- "McLuhan, Youth, and Literature", Horn Book 48 (Oct 1972, Dec 1972) and 49 (Feb 1973)
- "Greenwitch". The New York Times, May 4, 1974: 43
- "A Question of Taste". Children's Literature in Education, Vol. 7, Issue 2 (June 1976)
- "Of Dreams, Art, and the Unconscious". The Openhearted Audience: Ten Authors Talk About Writing for Children. Virginia Haviland, ed., 1980
- "A Branch of the Tree: Children's Literature as World Literature". Prelude: Mini-Seminars on Using Books Creatively, Series 4, Children's Book Council, 1979. Sound recording.
- "Art and Morality" Proceedings of the Seventh Annual Conference of the Children's Literature Association. Priscilla A. Ord, ed., March 1980
- "A Response to Perry Nodelman's 'Beyond Explanation'" Children's Literature 12, Francelia Butler, ed. Modern Language Association, 1980
- "Fantasy, Science Fiction and the Mushroom Planet Books". Children's Literature Association Quarterly 6 (Winter 1981)
- "One Woman as Writer and Feminist", Children's Literature Association Quarterly 7 (Winter 1982)
- "The Inmost Secret". Horn Book 59 (Feb 1983)
- "A Second Look: Gone-Away Lake". Horn Book 60: 5 (Sep/Oct 1984)
- "A Gathering of Gargoyles by Meredith Ann Pierce". The New York Times Book Review, December 30, 1984
- "The Eternal Moment". Children's Literature Association Quarterly 9 (Winter 1984)
- "With Winkled Brow and Cool Fresh Eye". Horn Book 61 (May/June 1985) and 61 (July/August 1985)
- "A Writer's Journey". Innocence and Experience: Essays and Conversation on Children's Literature. Barbara Harrison and Gregory Maguire, eds. Lothrop Lee & Shepard Books, 1987
- "Books Remembered: Eleanor Cameron". The Children's Book Council 41 (Jan–Aug 1987)
- "Afterword". Charlotte Sometimes by Penelope Farmer. Dell Yearling, 1987
- When I Was a Child. Barbara Rosen, ed. Children's Literature Association, 1992
- "A Discussion of Peter Dickinson's Eva". Horn Book 70: 3 (May/June 1994)
- "A Child Besotted with Words". Books that Invite Talk, Wonder, and Play with Language. Janice Kristo and Amy McClure, eds. National Council of Teachers of English, 1996
