= Whichford =

Village in Warwickshire, England

Coordinates: 52.010°N 1.544°W

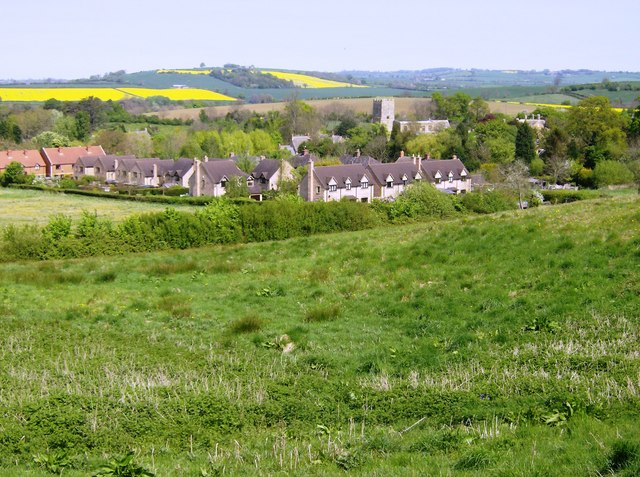
- View of Whichford

- Location within Warwickshire
- Population: 336 (2011 Census)
- OS grid reference: SP3134
- Civil parish: Whichford
- District: Stratford-on-Avon
- Shire county: Warwickshire
- Region: West Midlands
- Country: England
- Sovereign state: United Kingdom
- Post town: Shipston-on-Stour
- Postcode district: CV36
- Dialling code: 01608
- Police: Warwickshire
- Fire: Warwickshire
- Ambulance: West Midlands
- UK Parliament: Stratford-on-Avon
- Website: Whichford and Ascott

Whichford is a village and civil parish in Warwickshire, England, about 5 miles (8 km) southeast of Shipston-on-Stour. The parish adjoins the county boundary with Oxfordshire and the village is about 4 1/2 miles (7 km) north of the Oxfordshire town Chipping Norton.

The parish includes the hamlet Ascott, about 1/2 mile (800 m) east of Whichford village. The 2011 Census recorded the parish's population as 336.

== Manor and toponymy ==
The Domesday Book of 1086 records Wicford as a manor of 15 hides. In a document of about 1130 the name is spelt Wicheforda. Its etymology is not certain but it may mean "Ford of the Hwicce", who were an Anglo-Saxon tribe that settled and founded a kingdom in the area in the latter part of the 6th century AD.

Ascott is a common English name meaning "eastern cottage(s)".

== Parish church ==
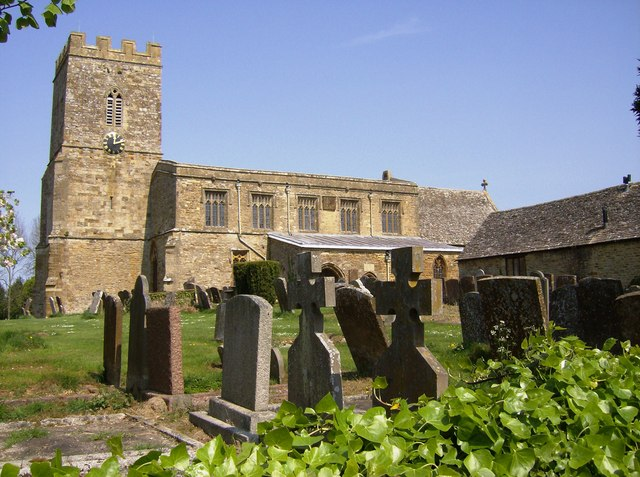
Church of St Michael

The oldest part of the Church of England parish church of St Michael is the 12th-century Norman south doorway. The nave and part of the chancel are also 12th-century. In the 13th century the chancel was enlarged and the north aisle was added. There were many alterations in the 14th century including the addition of the northwest tower, south chapel and insertion of several new windows. The nave clerestory was added in the 15th century. St Michael's is a Grade II listed building.

St Michael's west tower has a ring of eight bells. William Bagley of Chacombe, Northamptonshire cast the sixth bell in 1695. William Taylor, who at the time had bell-foundries at Loughborough and Oxford, cast the seventh bell in 1848. John Taylor & Co of Loughborough cast the third, fourth, fifth and tenor bells in 1904. At the time these completed a ring of six bells. The ring was increased to eight in 1998, when John Taylor & Co cast and hung the present treble and second bells. St Michael's has also a Sanctus bell that William Bagley cast in 1706.

== Whichford House ==
Whichford House was built in the 17th century as St Michael's rectory. In the 18th century it was enhanced with an open stairwell, and a stone chimneypiece and wooden panelling in one of the principal rooms. The House is a Grade II* listed building.

== Notable people ==
- George Rainbird (1905-1986), British publisher, lived at Whichford House

== Amenities ==
Whichford has a pub, the Norman Knight.

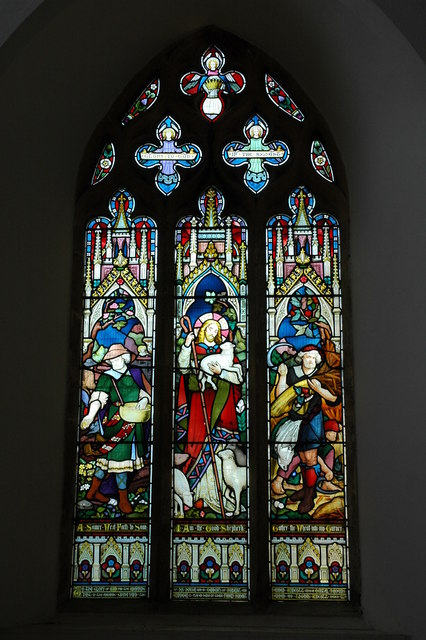
Gothic Revival stained glass window in the church representing Jesus as the Good Shepherd

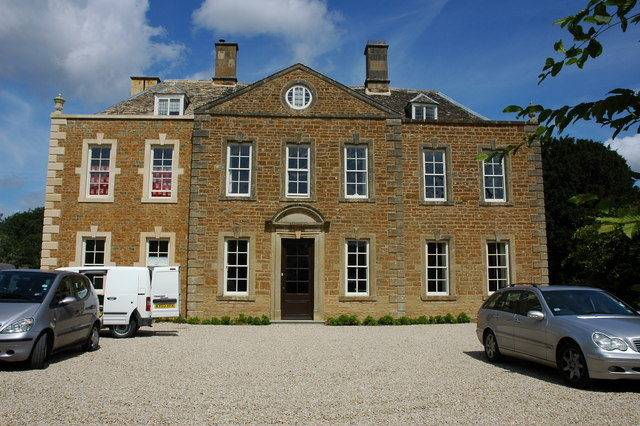
Whichford House

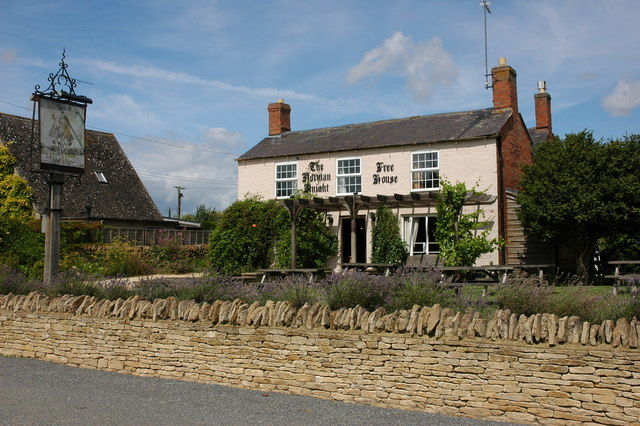
The Norman Knight pub

== Bibliography ==
- Mills, A. D. (1991). A Dictionary of British Place-Names. Oxford: Oxford University Press. ISBN 0-19-869156-4.
- Pevsner, Nikolaus; Wedgwood, Alexandra (1966). Warwickshire. The Buildings of England. Harmondsworth: Penguin Books. pp. 470–471.
- Salzman, LF, ed. (1949). "Whichford". A History of the County of Warwick. Victoria County History. Vol. V: Kington Hundred. London: Oxford University Press for the Institute of Historical Research. pp. 205–209.
