= James Fisher (naturalist) =

British broadcaster and naturalist (1912–1970)

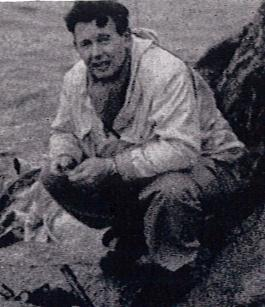
- Fisher on the 1955 Rockall expedition
- Born: James Maxwell McConnell Fisher; 3 September 1912; Clifton, Bristol, England
- Died: 25 September 1970 (aged 58); Hendon, England
- Occupations: author; ornithologist; naturalist; broadcaster
- Spouse: Margery Lilian Edith Turner
- Children: 6, including Edmund Fisher
- Father: Kenneth Fisher
- Relatives: Arnold Boyd (maternal uncle)
- Writing career
- Subject: Birds
- Notable work: Wild America

James Maxwell McConnell Fisher (3 September 1912 – 25 September 1970) was a British author, editor, broadcaster, naturalist and ornithologist. He was also a leading authority on Gilbert White and made over 1,000 radio and television broadcasts on natural history subjects.

== Early life ==
Fisher was the son of Kenneth Fisher (also a keen ornithologist and headmaster of Oundle School from 1922 to 1945); his maternal uncle was the Cheshire naturalist Arnold Boyd. He was educated at Eton, and began studying medicine at Magdalen College, Oxford, but later switched to zoology. He took part in the Oxford Arctic expedition in 1933 as ornithologist.

== Career ==
After university he joined London Zoo as an assistant curator, and during the war studied rooks for the Ministry of Agriculture. He later became a leading member of the RSPB and IUCN, a member of the National Parks Commission and vice-chairman of the Countryside Commission. Fisher presented the BBC Radio series Birds In Britain from its inception in March 1951 until its end, twelve years later.

Fisher was one of the members of the small party that on 18 September 1955 raised the Union Flag and took official possession for the UK of the tiny, uninhabited, rocky islet of Rockall, in the North Atlantic.

As well as writing his own books, he was an editor of Collins' New Naturalist series. He was the resident ornithologist in the regular "Nature Parliament" series broadcast in the 1950s on BBC radio as part of Children's Hour. It is likely that his writing and broadcasting played a significant role in the growth of interest in birdwatching in the United Kingdom in the post-Second World War period.

He was awarded the British Trust for Ornithology's Bernard Tucker Medal in 1966.

== Personal life ==
He was married to Margery Lilian Edith Turner, and they had six children, including the publisher Edmund Fisher. James Fisher died in a car crash on 25 September 1970, aged 58.

== Legacy ==
After Fisher's death he was commemorated in two ways. A public appeal allowed the seabird island of Copinsay, Orkney, to be purchased as a permanent nature reserve dedicated to his name. His papers were subsequently purchased by Bruce Coleman and John Burton, and presented to The National Archives.

== Bibliography ==
- 1939: Animals as Friends and how to Keep Them (J. M. Dent and Sons) with Margaret Shaw.
- 1939 Birds as Animals (W. Heinemann)
- 1939 The Living Thoughts of Darwin (Cassell) with Julian Huxley.
- 1941 The Natural History of Selborne (Penguin Books, 1941) editor of Gilbert White's work.
- 1941 Watching Birds (Pelican, paperback—sold over 3 million copies.
- 1942 The Birds of Britain (W. Collins)
- 1944 Birds of the Village (Penguin Books)
- 1947 Bird Recognition 1: sea-birds & waders (Pelican Books) (Penguin Books; revised edition 1954)
- 1951 Bird Recognition 2: birds of prey and water-fowl (Pelican Books) (Penguin Books)
- 1952 Birds of the Field (Collins)
- 1952 The Fulmar (Collins)
- 1952 Nature Parliament (J. M. Dent)
- 1953 A Thousand Geese (Collins, London), with Peter Scott
- 1954 A History of Birds (Houghton Mifflin, Boston, Mass.)
- 1954 The Wonderful World; The adventure of the earth we live on (Hanover House) Art editor: F. H. K. Henrion
- 1954 Sea-birds: an introduction to the natural history of the sea-birds of the North Atlantic (Collins), with Ronald Lockley
- 1955 Bird Recognition 3: rails, game-birds and larger perching and singing birds (Pelican Books). (Penguin Books)
- 1956 Adventure of the Sea (Rathbone Books)
- 1956 Birds and Beasts (Phoenix House)
- 1956 Rockall (Bles)
- 1956 Wild America (Collins), with Roger Tory Peterson.
- 1957 The Wonderful World of the Sea (Garden City Books)
- 1958 Adventure of the Air (Rathbone Books)
- 1958 Shackleton and the Antarctic (Houghton Mifflin, Boston, Mass.) with Margery Turner Fisher.
- 1959 The Wonderful World of the Air (Garden City Books)
- 1960 Nature: Earth, Plants, Animals (Macdonald) with Julian Huxley.
- 1961 The Doubleday Pictorial Library of Nature: earth, plants, animals (Doubleday, Garden City, N.Y.) with Julian Huxley.
- 1964 Shell Nature Book (Littlehampton Book Services, 1964) with Geoffrey Grigson.
- 1964 The World of Birds (Doubleday, Garden City, N.Y.) with Roger Tory Peterson.
- 1966 The Migration of Birds (Bodley Head) illustrated by Crispin Fisher.
- 1966 The Shell List of British and Irish Birds (Ebury Press)
- 1966 The Shell Bird Book (Ebury Press)
- 1966 Shell Nature Lovers' Atlas of England, Scotland & Wales (Ebury Press)
- 1967 Zoos of the World: The Story of Animals in Captivity (Natural History Press)
- 1969 The Red Book – Wildlife in Danger (Viking) with Noel Simon and Jack Vincent.
- 1971 Birds: an introduction to ornithology (Aldus Books) posthumously with Roger Tory Peterson.
- 1973 List of Mammals which Have Become Extinct or are Possibly Extinct Since 1600 (International Union for Conservation of Nature and Natural Resources) posthumously with H. A. Goodwin and J. M. Goodwin.
- 1974 Watching Birds (Poyser, 1974) posthumously with Jim Flegg, illustrated by Crispin Fisher.
- 1983 Darwin (Arnoldo Mondadori Editore, Milan) posthumously with Julian Huxley and Antonello La Vergata.

=== Contributions ===
- 1931 Marion Isabel Newbigin, Julian Huxley, Trevor Samuel Muffitt, Ernst Bernhard Almquist, Richard Elmhirst Biological Foundations in Education: a textbook for teacher training. (Allen & Unwin)
- 1948 Henry Eliot Howard, Territory in Bird Life. Collins (second edition, 1948) – Foreword, with Julian Huxley
- 1954 Evolution as a Process (1954) editors Julian Huxley, A. C. Hardy and E. B. Ford.
- 1976 Archibald Thorburn, Thorburn's Birds (Overlook Press) posthumously. Illustrated by Archibald Thorburn.
