= Kenneth Fisher (headmaster) =

British educationalist, headmaster at Oundle School from 1922 to 1945

- Born: 18 July 1882; Timperley
- Died: 2 October 1945 (aged 63); Oundle
- Alma mater: Manchester Grammar School; Magdalen College; University of Jena
- Position held: head teacher (1922–1945)

Kenneth Fisher JP (18 July 1882 – 2 October 1945) was a British educator and ornithologist. He was headmaster of Oundle School, an independent school in Oundle, Northamptonshire, England, run by the Worshipful Company of Grocers, from 1922 to 1945

== Early life and education ==
Fisher was born in Cheshire, son of J. H. Fisher. He was educated at Manchester Grammar School and Magdalen College, Oxford as a demy, and took a Ph.D. from the University of Jena in Germany before continuing his research at Manchester University.

== Career ==
He was senior science master at Clifton College from 1909 to 1919, having managed a Brunner Mond & Co munitions factory at Northwich in Cheshire during the First World War. From 1920 to 1922 he was senior science master at Eton, where he reorganized science education, and then took over headmastership at Oundle, where he remained until 1945; his headmastership was reckoned "a period of considerable success", during which many new buildings were constructed at the school.

Kenneth Fisher died "suddenly at Oundle on 2 October 1946, two months after retiring from the headmastership of Oundle School".

== Personal life ==
In 1911, Fisher married Isabel, daughter of James Boyd, of Altrincham, Cheshire (now part of Greater Manchester). They had three sons, the eldest being the naturalist James Fisher, and a daughter. Fisher was an enthusiastic amateur ornithologist, studying amongst others the marsh warblers at Clifton and short-eared owls in Northamptonshire, and contributing to British Birds a piece on goosanders seen at the Staines Reservoirs.
