= Arnold Boyd =

English naturalist (1885–1959)

Arnold Whitworth Boyd MC, MA, FZS, FRES, MBOU
- Born: 20 January 1885; Altrincham, Cheshire
- Died: 16 October 1959 (aged 74); Northwich, Cheshire
- Known for: Ornithology; Natural history
- Relatives: James Fisher (nephew)

Arnold Whitworth Boyd MC, MA, FZS, FRES, MBOU (20 January 1885 – 16 October 1959) was an ornithologist and naturalist from Altrincham, Cheshire, England.

Boyd was born on 20 January 1885. He was a long-time contributor to The Guardian 's "Country Diary" column, taking over a slot from his friend Thomas Coward in 1933, on the latter's death. In 1950, he revised Coward's The Birds of the British Isles and their Eggs for a new edition.

He made occasional radio appearances, such as a 1936 episode of My Week-End out of Doors on 'Cheshire Meres', and a 1957 Birds In Britain episode on great crested grebes, edited and introduced by his nephew James and produced by Winwood Reade.

In 1954 he was the founding President of the Manchester Ornithological Society, while continuing to be the East Cheshire regional representative of the British Trust for Ornithology, of which he was by then a past chairman.

Boyd died in Northwich, Cheshire on 16 October 1959.

Boyd was uncle to James Fisher, who also became a leading ornithologist and natural history writer and broadcaster. Following Fisher's death, many of Boyd's diaries, other papers and related material were acquired by Liverpool Museum.

== See also ==
- New Naturalist

== Bibliography ==
- The Country Diary of a Cheshire Man. Collins. 1946.
- A Country Parish: Great Budworth in the county of Chester. New Naturalist. Collins. 1951.

=== Articles ===
- "Tally Ho! or The Big Day". Bird Notes. 25 (8). Royal Society for the Protection of Birds: 307–8. Autumn 1953.
