= Peter Beales =

British rosarian (1936–2013)

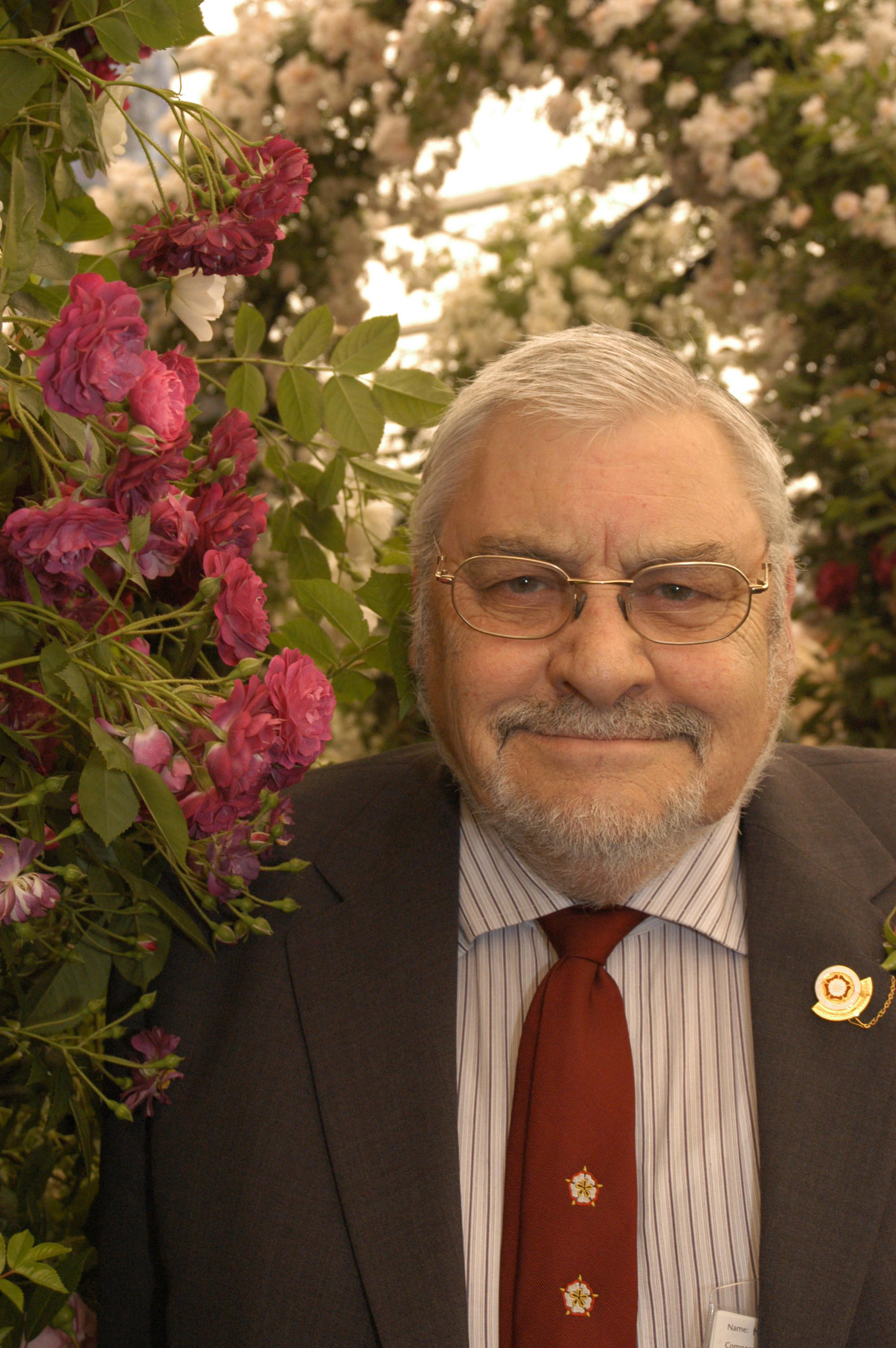
- Peter Beales MBE
- Born: Peter Leslie Beales; 22 July 1936; Norfolk
- Died: 26 January 2013 (aged 76); Norfolk
- Occupation: Rosarian
- Known for: rose breeder/nurseryman, author, lecturer
- Awards: Victoria Medal of Honour

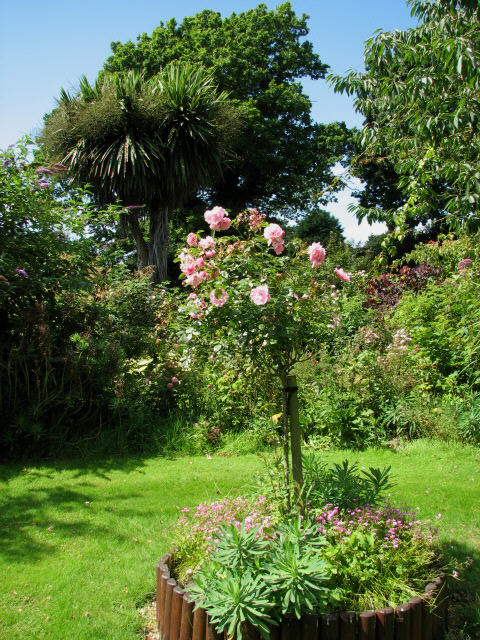
The rose gardens at Peter Beales nursery, Attleborough are home to over 1,200 rose varieties (Evelyn Simak, geograph.org.uk)

Peter Beales MBE, (22 July 1936 – 26 January 2013) was a British rosarian, author and lecturer. Beales was considered one of the leading experts on roses, especially species and classic roses, preserving many old varieties and introducing 70 new cultivars during his lifetime. He served as the President of the Royal National Rose Society from 2003 until 2005. Speaking of his contribution on BBC news, Alan Titchmarsh said: "It was the old and classic roses that Peter loved best and by growing them and making them available to a wider range of gardeners, he did tremendous work in terms of our rose-growing heritage."

== Early life and career ==
Peter Leslie Beales was born in Norfolk on 22 July 1936 and brought up by his grandparents near North Walsham. He studied at Norwich City College and then trained with LeGrice Roses in North Walsham before national service, during which time he met his wife Joan. Peter then worked as manager at Hillings Rose Nursery in Surrey, under the guidance of legendary rosarian Graham Stuart Thomas. He succeeded Thomas as foreman of roses.

== Establishment of rose nursery ==
In 1968, Peter Beales started Peter Beales Roses Ltd. – initially in Swardeston, Norfolk, before moving to the market town of Attleborough. Beales' passion and specialism was wild and classic breeds of roses, many of which he saved from extinction by collecting and breeding them. Over time, the family-run nursery grew to become a major specialist centre, growing and retailing over 1,200 different varieties of rose. Beales' nursery holds more than 100 types of wild roses, recognised by the Royal Horticultural Society (RHS) as the most extensive collection of its kind in Britain. Beales' nursery also holds the National Collection of Rosa Spp (species roses). Peter Beales Roses has bred and introduced more than 70 rose cultivars. The company set up a full e-commerce website in 1997.

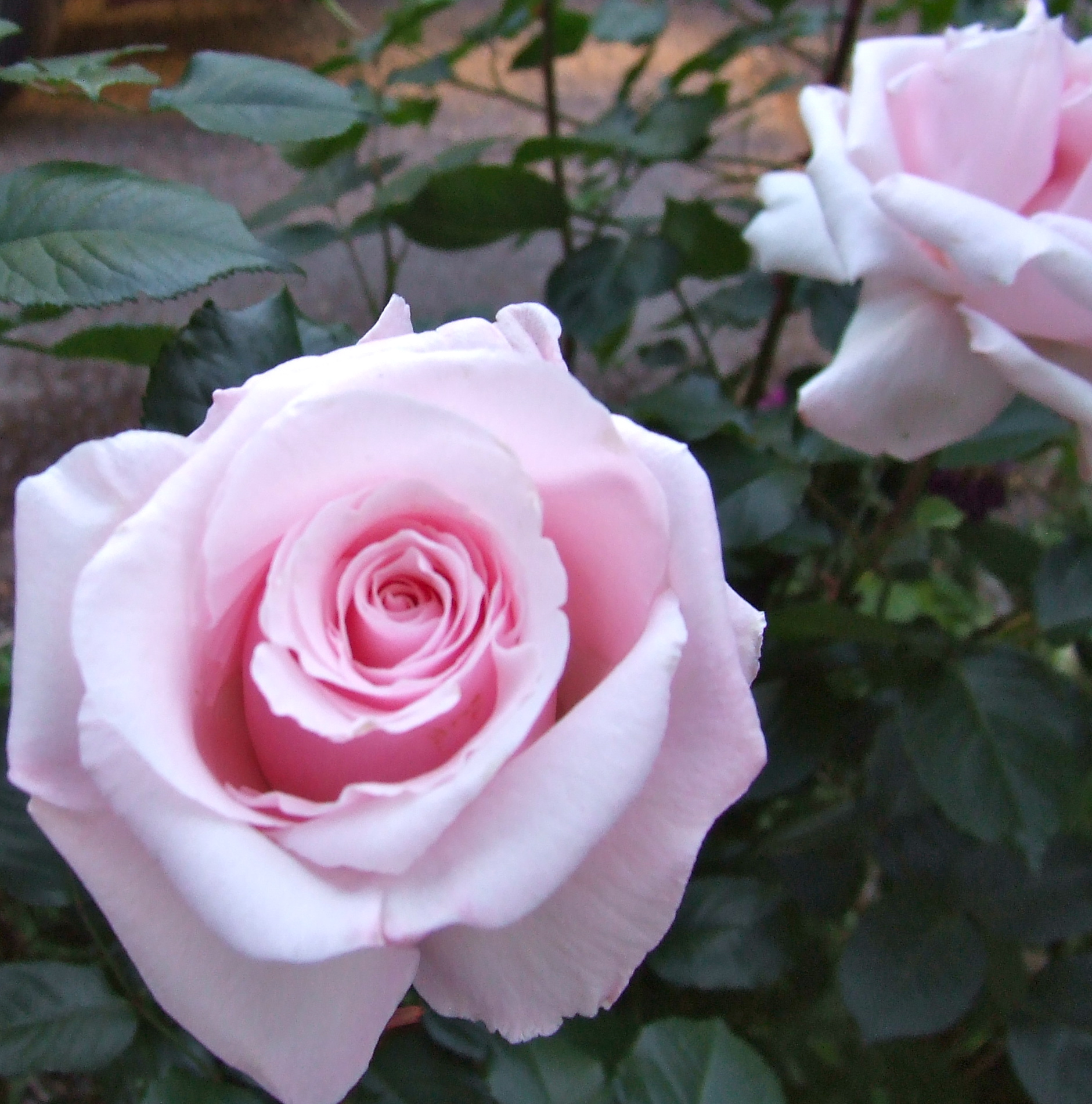
Anna Pavlova, 1981, one of the 70 cultivars raised by Peter Beales

== Industry involvement and accolades ==
Peter Beales began exhibiting at the Chelsea Flower Show in 1971 and received 19 gold medals during his career. He also received the Lawrence Medal in 1997 and 2007 for the best exhibit at any RHS show.

The RHS awarded Peter Beales the Victoria Medal of Honour, the society's top award, in 2003 for his work to promote gardening and roses.

== Publishing and speaking career ==
The first publications from Peter Beales were pamphlets for a Jarrolds series on roses in the 1970s. His first major publication was the book Classic Roses in 1985. Other titles followed, including Twentieth-Century Roses in 1988, Roses in 1992, Visions of Roses in 1996, New Classic Roses in 1997, and A Passion for Roses in 2004. He lectured around the world on the subject and received a Lifetime Achievement Award from the Garden Media Guild in 2009.

Beales was appointed an MBE in 2005. Three years later, he published an autobiography, Rose Petals and Muddy Footprints. In 2012, Peter Beales Roses introduced the Queen's Jubilee Rose at Chelsea Flower Show. Peter Beales died on 26 January 2013 at the age of 76.

== "Manor House" roses ==
=== Partial list of Beales cultivars ===
- 'Anne-Marie Laing'
- 'Care 2000'
- 'Clarence House'
- 'Dixieland Linda'
- 'Dorothy Wilson'
- 'Evelyn May'
- 'Everest Double Fragrance'
- 'Great Ormond Street'
- 'Hunslet Moss'
- 'James Mason'
- 'Janet B Wood'
- 'Jill Dando'
- 'John Grooms'
- 'Lady Romsey'
- 'Macmillan Nurse'
- 'Mannington Cascade'
- 'Norwich Castle'
- 'Anna Pavlova'
- 'Pinta'
- 'Royal Smile'
