= Graham Stuart Thomas =

English horticulturalist and garden designer

- Graham Thomas holding his namesake rose, bred by David Austin
- Born: Graham Stuart Thomas; 3 April 1909; Cambridge
- Died: 17 April 2003 (aged 94); Woking
- Occupations: Botanist, garden designer, author, artist
- Known for: Roses, garden design, garden writing
- Awards: OBE; Victoria Medal of Honour; Veitch Memorial Medal

Graham Stuart Thomas OBE VMH (3 April 1909 – 17 April 2003) was an English horticulturist, who is likely best known for his work with garden roses, his restoration and stewardship of over 100 National Trust gardens and for writing 19 books on gardening, many of which remain classics today. However, as he states in the Preface to his outstanding book, The Rock Garden and its Plants: From Grotto to Alpine House, "My earliest enthusiasms in gardening were for....alpines." p8

In his obituary in the Los Angeles Times, Clair Martin, rose curator of Huntington Botanical Gardens said: "Thomas set about preserving the heritage of old roses when many of them were on the verge of extinction".

== Early life ==
Graham Stuart Thomas was born in Cambridge into a family of keen amateur gardeners and musicians. His father William Richard Thomas was a clerk to Cambridge University syndicate. He is said to have developed his interest in plants at the age of six, when he was given a fuchsia as a gift. On another occasion, he spent a birthday present of half a crown buying alpine plants on Cambridge Market. By the age of eight. he had decided to make gardening his career.

At 17, he joined Cambridge University Botanic Garden, which enabled him to also attend university lectures on horticulture and botany. These lectures were his only formal education in the field of horticulture, although as a member of staff at the botanic garden he built up a practical and theoretical knowledge that would become the foundation of his career. One of his earliest design projects was working on the rose garden there.

== Horticultural career ==
In 1930, Thomas joined the then famous Six Hills Nursery in Stevenage, working under alpine expert Clarence Elliott. The following year he became foreman at T. Hilling & Co (Hillings), a renowned 300-acre nursery near Chobham, Surrey.

It was while working at Hillings that Thomas met the formidable garden designer Gertrude Jekyll, then aged 88, when he wrote her a letter and she invited him for a cup of tea and a chat about gardening. She became a mentor to the young gardener, passing on her theories of garden design as an art. It was around this time that Thomas began to collect old shrub and climbing rose varieties, many of which had fallen out of favour because they only flowered once during the season.

Thomas became partner at Sunningdale Nurseries – then the most revered nursery in the country – with Jim Russell. The partners became known for planting schemes that focused on form and foliage, as much as flowers. At Sunningdale, Thomas established his entire collection of roses. It was here also that he began introducing new or rediscovered garden plants – notable introductions from this period include the perennial Geranium 'Claridge Druce'. While Thomas would become associated with many other projects, he would remain a director of the Sunningdale nursery until 1971.

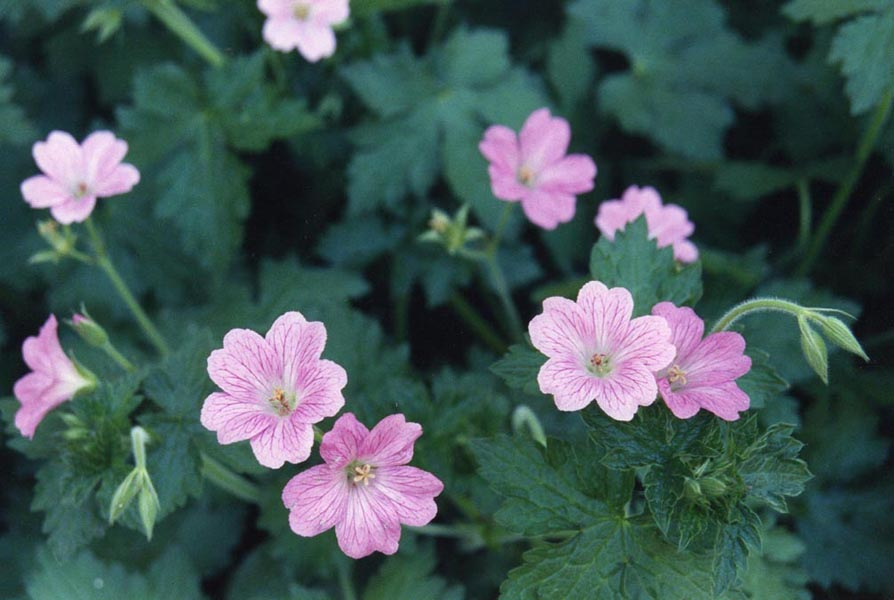
Geranium x oxonianum 'Claridge Druce' was a notable introduction by Graham Thomas while he was at Sunningdale Nurseries

Thomas's first important publication about roses was a booklet called The Manual of Shrub Roses, describing all the varieties, with advice on cultivation. In the foreword he described the booklet's aim as: "To bring forth these lovely things from retirement." His classic books on roses – Old Shrub Roses (1955), Shrub Roses Of Today (1962) and Climbing Roses Old And New (1965) followed and cemented his influence. They also provided much-needed information about the history and extent of the genus at a time when old varieties were being overshadowed by their repeat flowering and showier cousins hybrid teas and floribundas.

== Work with the National Trust ==
Thomas began an informal association with the National Trust in the late 1940s, initially working at Hidcote Manor when it passed to the Trust in 1948. The relationship was formalised when he became its official gardens adviser in 1955. This was a relationship that was to continue for the succeeding 20 years and gave him the opportunity to work with a vast array of plants in spectacular historic settings, such as Sissinghurst Castle and Mount Stewart. It is Mottisfont Abbey – a creation that he himself described as a "masterpiece" – where his rose collection found its final home, and where his garden design skills can be best appreciated.

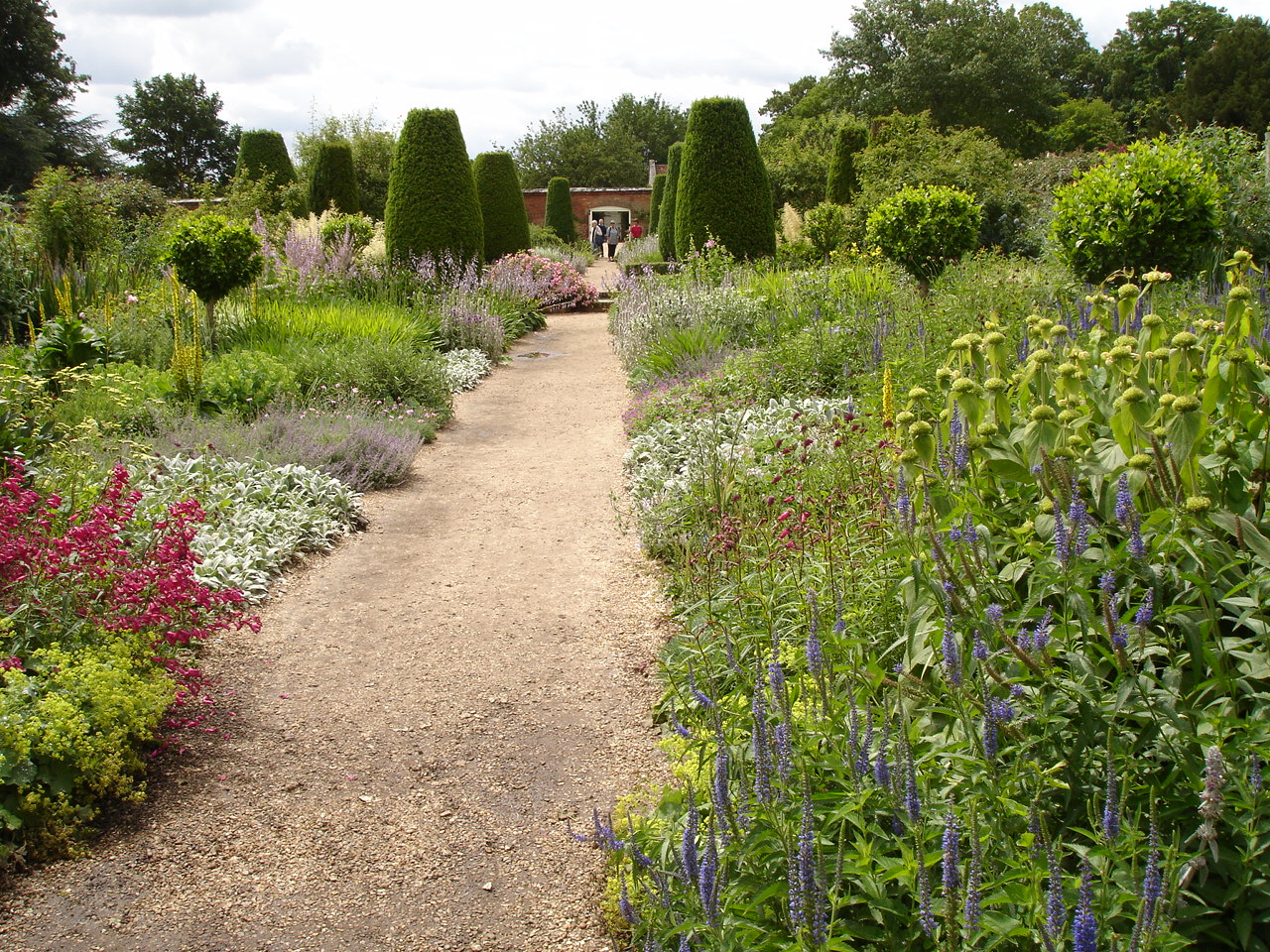
Mottisfont Abbey – Graham Stuart Thomas's "masterpiece"

He also assisted with the 1968 restoration of the Sezincote gardens.

== Gardening accolades and legacy ==
In 1975, Thomas received the OBE for his work with the National Trust. Other awards included the Royal Horticultural Society's Veitch Memorial Medal in 1966 and Victoria Medal of Honour in 1968. He received a Gold Medal from the RHS for his paintings and drawings, the Dean Hole Medal from the Royal National Rose Society and the Garden Writers' Guild Lifetime Achievement Award in 1996.

In addition to his garden designs, books and illustrations, Thomas is remembered by name in various garden plants, including the vigorous honeysuckle Lonicera periclymenum 'Graham Thomas' and the 1983 David Austin rose 'Graham Thomas'.

He influenced a number of other notable rose growers, including Peter Beales, who worked with him for a short time at Hillings.

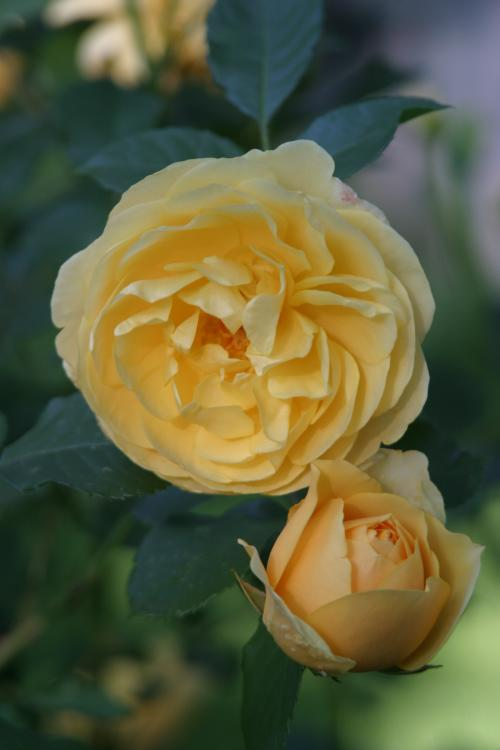
Rose 'Graham Thomas' was introduced by David Austin in 1983. Austin and Thomas shared a love of old roses

== Books ==
Books written by Graham Stuart Thomas include:

- The Old Shrub Roses (1955)
- Colour in the Winter Garden (1957)
- Shrub Roses of Today (1962)
- Climbing Roses Old and New (1965)
- Perennial Garden Plants (1975)
- Plants for Ground Cover (1977)
- Gardens of the National Trust (1979)
- The Art of Planting (1984)
- Complete Flower Paintings and Drawings of Graham Stuart Thomas (1987)
- The Rock Garden and its Plants: From Grotto to Alpine House (1989 Sagapress/Timber Press)
- Ornamental Shrubs, Climbers and Bamboos, (1992)
- The Graham Stuart Thomas Rose Book, (1994) (republication of Old Shrub Roses, Shrub Roses of Today, and Climbing Roses Old and New)
- Cuttings from My Garden Notebooks (1997)
- Treasured Perennials (1999)
- Graham Stuart Thomas' Three Gardens of Pleasant Flowers: With Notes on Their Design, Maintenance and Plants (2001)
- The Garden Through the Year (2002)
- Recollections of Great Gardeners (2003)

== External sources ==
- 2001 Graham Thomas interview with Carolyn Parker for Journal of the Heritage Rose Foundation (reproduced on Rosesfromatoz.com in 2006)
- Graham Stuart Thomas botanical drawings at RHS website
- Graham Stuart Thomas article on his favourite roses, from Historic Rose Journal, 2000
