= The Summer Birds =

1962 children's novel by Penelope Farmer

- First edition
- Author: Penelope Farmer
- Language: English
- Genre: Children's novel
- Publisher: Chatto & Windus (UK); Harcourt Brace (US)
- Publication date: 1962
- Publication place: United Kingdom
- Media type: Print
- Followed by: Emma in Winter

The Summer Birds is a children's novel by British writer Penelope Farmer, published in 1962 by Chatto & Windus, and receiving a Carnegie Medal commendation.

It is the first of three books featuring the Makepeace sisters, Charlotte and Emma, These three books are sometimes known as the Aviary Hall books.

== Background ==
At the age of twenty-one, Penelope Farmer was contracted for her first collection of short stories, The China People. Whilst working as a teacher for the London County Council Education Department, she was approached by editor Margaret K. McElderry of Harcourt Brace to write a children's novel. Farmer took one story originally intended for The China People, but which proved too long to include, writing, "It was too big an idea, too bony as a short story." This was rewritten as the first chapter of The Summer Birds (1962), her first book featuring Charlotte and Emma Makepeace. The main settings of the book are a small village school in the South Downs in southern England, and Aviary Hall, the girls' home.

According to Farmer, Charlotte and Emma, who grow up in their Grandfather Elijah's house, were originally based on her mother and her mother's sister as children, having no parents and "…having to be everything to each other," one being the responsible one, the other being rather difficult.

== Plot summary ==
Charlotte and Emma Makepeace are children living with their grandfather, Elijah, in a country house in the South Downs in southern England. Named Aviary Hall, the house is decorated with stuffed birds and images of birds. On the way to their small English village school, they meet and befriend a mysterious boy who tells them that he is able to teach them to fly. Over the following days and weeks, the boy teaches Charlotte to fly, and then the other children at the school learn this ability. The boy remains invisible to the adults, with the exception of the schoolteacher, Miss Hallibutt, who herself, as a child, had wished that she could fly. The boy tells her that he is unable to teach her to fly: he can only teach children.

The children spend an idyllic summer flying above their village and the downs. As summer draws to an end, the boy offers to take the children on a journey, and the children prepare to go with the boy. Charlotte realises that the boy is not telling them the whole truth, and forces the boy to admit the truth. The boy reveals that while he wants to take them back to his country where they can fly forever, and be children forever, without adult responsibilities, the cost of following him is that they will never be able to return to their homes and their loved ones. The children decide that this indeed is too high a price to pay, and all decline to travel with the boy, with the exception of one girl, who has neither parents, nor a happy life to return to. The children return to their homes and prepare to begin a new term at school.

== Continuity ==
The sequel novel, Emma in Winter continues the theme of flying. In the absence of the mysterious bird-boy, the children are not able to fly in their waking life. However, in Emma and Bobby's dreams, they retain this ability. Emma in Winter features the same village school setting as The Summer Birds, set around a year and a half after the events of The Summer Birds, with Charlotte now in her second term at a boarding school.

The Summer Birds introduces a theme of referencing the beginning of the world. Chapter 1 of Part Two has the description, "The next morning the sun caught sparkle on every leaf and the air smelled fresh and wet – it was like the beginning of the world morning." In Emma in Winter, Emma and Bobby in their shared dream adventure, would wonder if they will see the Garden of Eden, with the two later travelling back in time to the beginning of the world.

== Reviews ==
The Summer Birds was highly acclaimed by reviewers on its release, with some reviewers understandably comparing it to J. M. Barrie's Peter Pan, as both books feature themes such as flying and unending childhood. Hugh Crago reviewed the book in Signal, writing, "The Summer Birds is Peter Pan pared down, the whimsy, the sentimentality and the extravagant pantomime mythmaking cut away, leaving the essential core of genuine wonder..."

In 1963, Marion R. Hewitt reviewed the book in an article about Penelope Farmer in The Junior Bookshelf. She writes that the children in the story are "real and vital", in particular Charlotte,

...[a] solid, sensible child but so sensitive that she feels everyone's hurts. One knows, with deep pity, that she will always carry the weight of the world on her shoulders. She is all children's conscience as the boy is their fantasy.

She continues her praise of Farmer's insightful descriptions of the events and emotions in the book,

This is a beautiful book. The description of the Downs at night has an ethereal poetry and the sadness of the farewell [when the nameless boy returns to his island home] is delicately and truthfully shown. It is part of growing up, and the author never cheats by glossing over unhappiness. But just as truthfully the joy of living, happiness and excitement of childhood is shown as the children fight and clown their way through the summer.

== Awards ==
The Summer Birds received a Carnegie Medal commendation in 1963. It was also listed that year as an American Library Association Notable Book.

== Adaptations ==
In 1987, PBS Video released an educational adaptation of The Summer Birds on video. This video combines narration, artwork, sound effects and music to introduce a number of featured children's books to children.

== Sequels ==
A second book, Emma in Winter, set roughly one and a half years later, with Emma as the main character, followed in 1966. Charlotte Sometimes followed in 1969, set slightly before the events of Emma in Winter, which follows Charlotte's first term at boarding school, about a year after the events in The Summer Birds.
