= Edmund Fisher (publisher) =

British publisher (1939–1995)

- Born: Edmund Boyd Fisher; 23 February 1939
- Died: 1 March 1995 (aged 56); London, England
- Education: Eton College
- Alma mater: Magdalen College, Oxford
- Occupation: Publisher
- Spouses: Elizabeth Berlin; Anne-Louise Harder
- Children: 4
- Parent(s): James Fisher; Margery Fisher
- Relatives: Irving Berlin (father-in-law)

Edmund Boyd Fisher (23 February 1939 – 1 March 1995) was a British publisher.

== Early life ==
Edmund Boyd Fisher was born on 23 February 1939, the son of the naturalist James Fisher, and the literary critic and academic Margery Fisher (née Turner). He was educated at Eton, where he was a scholar, and at Magdalen College, Oxford.

== Career ==
Fisher started working with the British Printing Corporation, followed by training at Doubleday in New York, after which he was employed by W. H. Allen & Co., and then George Rainbird. After Rainbird retired and sold his publishing house to Roy Thomson, Fisher took over as its head, until Thomson appointed him as managing director of Michael Joseph, which Thomson had also acquired.

Fisher was "famous for his long, liquid lunches and dinners".

== Personal life ==
He married Elizabeth Berlin, the daughter of Irving Berlin, whom he met when he was working for Doubleday in New York. They had two daughters, and eventually divorced. He later married Anne-Louise Harder, and they had two sons. Fisher died in London from cancer on 1 March 1995.
