= David May (journalist) =

English investigative journalist and editor (1948–2019)

- Born: David Robert Maldwyn May; 13 December 1948; Plymouth, Devon, England
- Died: 27 October 2019 (aged 70); Plymouth, Devon, England
- Occupations: Investigative journalist; Editor
- Years active: 1968–2013
- Spouse: Charlotte Veysey (m. 1976; div. 1986)
- Children: 2

David Robert Maldwyn May (13 December 1948 – 27 October 2019) was an English investigative journalist and editor. He began working at the Kensington Times before joining the London listings magazine Time Out as news editor and later was appointed joint editor with Jerome Brune. May began working at The Sunday Times as a freelance reporter in 1975, covering domestic and foreign stories and becoming its news editor and also worked for its investigative Insight team. He left the newspaper and print journalism in 1982 and joined ITN as a journalist for News at Ten and later for Channel 4 News, producing multiple campaigning documentaries. May later worked in public relations for Channel 5 and Channel 4 before joining the BBC as its head of strategic communications in 2001.

== Early life ==
May was born in Plymouth on 13 December 1948. His father, John May, was a master builder and his mother, Gwynneth (née Jones Francis), ran the soft furnishings department at the Co-op in Plymouth. May was educated firstly at Hyde Park Junior School at then at Widey Technical Secondary School in the city. He wanted to go to art college but decided otherwise and went to pursue a career in journalism.

== Career ==
In 1968, May moved to London from Plymouth with the intention of becoming a journalist and had a chance meeting with the London listings magazine Time Out founder Tony Elliott, who encouraged him to get some experience at a local newspaper. He obtained a job at the Kensington Times, authoring stories that the paper had no interest in, such as gay rights, women's rights, and council corruption, for instance – he sold to various anti-establishment publications such as the underground paper Friends under the pseudonym “hacktypewriters”. From there, May joined Time Out as a news editor in 1971 and later became its joint editor with Jerome Brune. In 1972, he interviewed the British armed bank robber Kenneth Littlejohn, prior to his breaking out of prison from Mountjoy Prison, Ireland. May's interview with Littlejohn was picked up by the British national press.

In 1972, following stories in Time Out about The Angry Brigade, the far-left terrorist group that had set off explosives near establishment sites in the United Kingdom in 1971, May was questioned by the police. When he later ran a story about the kidnapped Spanish banker Bernando Suarez, the head of the Bank of Bilbao, and refused demands by the police to disclose the names of his sources, he was charged with perverting the course of justice and tried at the Old Bailey. May was acquitted by a jury in September 1975. He joined The Sunday Times as a freelance reporter covering domestic and foreign stories in 1975. May became the paper's news editor and also worked for its investigative Insight team. With his colleagues Lewis Chester and Magnus Linklater, he co-authored the 1979 book Jeremy Thorpe: A Secret Life, and with Stewart Tendler, The Brotherhood of Eternal Love: From Flower Power to Hippie Mafia about California's LSD counterculture in 1984.

In 1982, May left The Sunday Times and print journalism and joined ITN. He was a journalist on News at Ten and later for Channel 4 News, producing multiple campaigning documentaries after joining a documentary unit as a news producer and then home news editor. May also was a news producer and later home news editor. The 1990s marked May's transition away from journalism into public relations, joining the entertainment agency Coalition as a partner alongside Rob Partridge. He developed a new list of corporate clients. May returned to television in 1996. He was employed as an adviser on PR and strategy for the launch of Channel 5, working with The Guardian's former marketing director David Brook. May persuaded Simon Fuller to lend his group the Spice Girls to launch Channel 5 for no fee and be provided extensive media coverage.

In 1997, he moved to Channel 4, as PR and promotion adviser. May worked extensively to launch Film4 and E4 and the channel's “Caribbean Summer” season of festivals for the West Indies series when Channel 4 won the broadcast rights for Test cricket in 2000. The festivals were held close to each match and combined cricket with live music. Their innovation was to broadcast live television coverage to large screens at each site. In 2001, May was appointed head of strategic communications at the BBC. He pioneered the use of huge screens around the country for significant cultural and sporting events, among them the 2012 Summer Olympics. After retiring from the BBC in 2013, he enrolled at the Plymouth College of Art. May was awarded a first-class degree two days before his death.

== Personal life ==
He married The Economist's art editor Charlotte Veysey in 1976. The marriage produced two children but it ended in divorce in 1986 although they remained on friendly terms. May died of neutropenic sepsis and T-cell leukaemia at Derriford Hospital, Plymouth on 27 October 2019.

== Legacy ==
His niece launched a weekly online student newspaper at Brunel University of London in his name in 2020.
