= Hyde Park Junior School =

Coordinates: 50.3856°N 4.1371°W

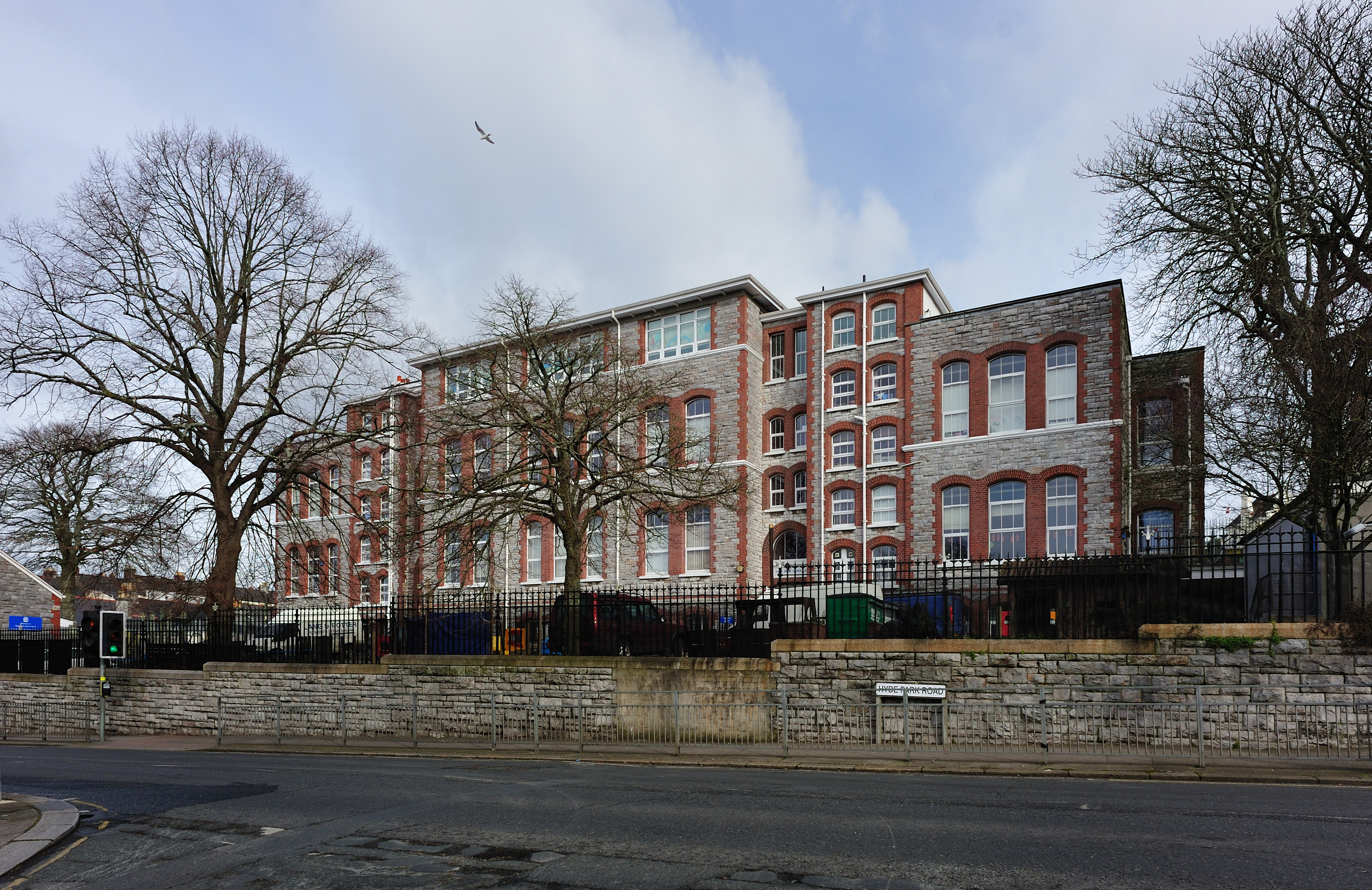

Location
- Hyde Park Road; Plymouth, Devon, PL3 4RH; England

Information
- Type: Academy
- Established: Spring 1904
- Local authority: Plymouth City Council
- Department for Education URN: 146710 Tables
- Ofsted: Reports
- Staff: 13 teachers, and 30 support staff
- Gender: Coeducational
- Age: 7 to 11
- Enrolment: 360
- Houses: Meavy , Lynher , Tamar and Plym
- Website: http://www.hydeparkjuniorschool.co.uk/

Hyde Park Junior School (HPJS), founded in 1904, is a coeducational junior school located on Hyde Park Road, close to Mutley Plain in Plymouth, Devon, England. Catering for around 360 boys and girls between the ages of 7 and 11, it is housed in the same building as its partner school, Hyde Park Infants. The school's catchment area extends across part of the suburbs of Plymouth including Mutley and Mannamead.

== History ==
Hyde Park School is built on the site where, in the 1590s, Thornhill House stood, which was occupied by Sir Francis Drake. Drake's Leat also ran past nearby.

The school building was designed by Henry John Snell (1843–1924), who was responsible for a number of Plymouth's 19th-century buildings. Hyde Park was the last school designed and built by the Plymouth School Board before the local authority took over responsibility for education in 1903, and it was officially opened by the Mayor of Plymouth on 27 May 1904. Upon opening the school had the capacity for 512 infants on the ground floor, 480 girls on the first floor and 430 boys on the third floor as well as two classrooms in the basement and a large playground with covered sheds.

During the First World War, Hyde Park was used as a hospital and convalescent home. In the 1920s and 1930s, the school continued to run as three separate schools (infant, junior and high) and it was common for there to be 50 children in a class.

On 20 March 1941, during the Plymouth Blitz, the school was severely damaged by enemy action. Accounts vary as to the cause of the damage: it may have been incendiary bombs, though an eyewitness account reported that a landmine carried by a parachute landed on the roof. The pitched roof was destroyed and has never been replaced: the building now has a flat roof. After the incident the children continued lessons in local church halls and also shared half-day sessions with other schools – the boys with Montpelier and the girls with Laira Green. Some children were evacuated with their teachers to Cornwall. In 1942, some returned to Hyde Park and a Nissen hut was erected in the front playground, it was used as a British Restaurant and then later as accommodation for the school. It was eventually dismantled in 1959. According to a short news item in The Times, the school was re-opened after the air raid damage by the Duke of Kent on 14 February 1942 as a social centre, the funds for which had been supplied by the British War Relief Society of America. Beneath the school is a World War II air raid shelter which since the 1990s has been featured on local television and has been used to teach the children about the war. This is still open to the pupils for educational purposes when they study World War 2.

In 1948, the school was visited by the Down Your Way radio program to interview the pupils about their "Paper for Salvage" scheme. By the early 1950s, the rebuilding of the school was complete. An inspection report from 1954 noted that there were nearly 1,250 on roll in the Junior and Infant school, and that the building was shared by the two schools.

=== 21st century ===
The school logo

In 2004, both the infants and the junior school celebrated the centenary. That year, it was said that Hyde Park had the largest population of ethnic minority pupils among primary schools in Plymouth.

2005 saw a modernisation of the school as broadband internet access was introduced, every classroom received an interactive whiteboard, and the old cloakroom was renovated into a new modern library. Headteacher Bernie Evans said the new location and modern feel of the room was intended to give reading status and the library a more prominent location. The old library was transformed into two smaller cloakrooms, accessible to years five and six. To assist road safety for their pupils, the school designed fashionable high-visibility jackets.

Previously a community school administered by Plymouth City Council, in January 2019 Hyde Park Junior School converted to academy status. The school is now sponsored by the Horizon Multi-Academy Trust.

== Academic standards ==
Following their June 2004 inspection, Ofsted wrote "This is a good school. It provides good value for money. Effective leadership and management and good teaching ensure that pupils achieve well. The school provides a very supportive community with a very positive ethos in which all pupils thrive. Pupils enjoy school and have very positive attitudes to their work."

The March 2010 inspection by Ofsted awarded the school outstanding. In February 2014 Ofsted rated the school as good.

Standards then dropped significantly, leading to the school being graded 'Requires Improvement' by Ofsted. The school subsequently converted to Academy status.

Mrs Yvonne Jones was appointed Executive Headteacher of both Infant and Junior Schools in 2022, with Mr Dellow (previously deputy) appointed as Head of Hyde Park Juniors.

== Awards ==
- Basic Skills Quality Mark
- International Schools Award

== Notable former pupils ==
- David May, investigative journalist and editor
- Wayne Sleep, dancer, choreographer, and director
- Tony Soper, naturalist, author, and TV Presenter
