= Jewels from the Moon =

1964 book by Eleanor Cameron

Jewels from the Moon and The Meteor That Couldn't Stay
- Author: Eleanor Cameron
- Illustrator: Vic Dowd
- Language: English
- Series: The Mushroom Planet Books
- Genre: Science fiction Children's novel
- Publisher: American Book Company
- Publication date: 1964
- Publication place: United States
- Media type: Print (Softcover)
- Pages: 65 pp
- Preceded by: A Mystery for Mr. Bass
- Followed by: Time and Mr. Bass

Jewels from the Moon and The Meteor That Couldn't Stay is a 1964 children's science fiction book written by Eleanor Cameron and illustrated by Vic Dowd. Although the book features characters from Cameron's five Mushroom Planet books, it is tangential to the series. In fact, it is little known even to fans of the series because it was designed as a school reading book and was distributed in that manner by the American Book Company. The book is 64 pages long and features comprehension, discussion, and vocabulary questions after each story.

== Plot summary ==
This volume is composed of two short stories. In the first, "Jewels from the Moon", Chuck Masterson and David Topman meet a mysterious but kindly old lady (a Mycetian like Mr. Bass) who takes them on a spectacular dream journey. In the second story, "The Meteor That Couldn't Stay", David accompanies Prewytt Brumblydge (a prominent character in Mr. Bass's Planetoid and A Mystery for Mr. Bass) on an expedition to recover portions of a brumblium meteorite.

== See also ==
- Time and Mr. Bass, the sequel volume to this story.
