= Birds In Britain =

- Country of origin: United Kingdom
- Home station: BBC Home Service
- Hosted by: James Fisher
- Original release: 19 March 1951 – 17 March 1963

Birds In Britain was a BBC Radio series, broadcast from 1951 to 1963 on the Home Service, about wild birds. Its lead presenter was James Fisher.

It was created as an offshoot from a programme called The Naturalist, in order to avoid overwhelming the content of the latter with ornithological material.

The first episode was broadcast on 19 March 1951 and was presented by Fisher and produced by Desmond Hawkins, with guest speakers John Gibb (Edward Grey Institute), Bruce Campbell (British Trust for Ornithology), Hilda Quick (Cornwall Birdwatching Society) and Ludwig Koch.

Other presenters and guests included notable ornithologists, such as Arnold Boyd, William Condry, Eric Ennion, Julian Huxley, Tony Norris, Peter Scott, and Tony Soper. Soper was also the producer of some episodes.

The show was first broadcast quarterly, and eventually monthly, alternating every fortnight with The Naturalist. It ran until March 1963.

A biographical note on Fisher, accompanying The National Archives' record for their collection of his papers, says the programme was "enormously popular in [its] day". David Attenborough has said of The Naturalist and Birds of Britain:

As a boy, I listened to those programmes, and I dare say my own passion was stoked by them.
