= Tony Soper =

British naturalist and broadcaster (1929–2024)

- Born: 10 January 1929; Southampton, Hampshire, England
- Died: 18 September 2024 (aged 95)
- Education: Hyde Park Junior School; Devonport High School for Boys
- Occupations: Author and broadcaster
- Employer: BBC
- Known for: Ornithology
- Spouse: Hilary
- Children: Two sons

Tony Soper (10 January 1929 – 18 September 2024) was a British naturalist, author, and broadcaster.

== Life and career ==
Soper was born on 10 January 1929, in Southampton, Hampshire, the son of Ella Soper (née Lythgoe), a former shop assistant and member of the local Townswomen's Guild, and Bert Soper, a shipping agent. Soon after Soper's birth the family moved to Plymouth where he attended Hyde Park Elementary School and Devonport High School for Boys. He joined the BBC at age 17 as a "youth-in-training", subsequently graduating by way of studio manager to features producer in radio, then moved into television. Among the radio programmes that he produced were Birds In Britain.

Soper co-founded the BBC Natural History Unit as its first film producer, with Patrick Beech the then South West Controller. Cutting his teeth on the LOOK series he organised far-flung wildlife filming projects. He presented live television programmes, including Birdwatch, Birdspot, Discovering Birds, Discovering Animals, Beside the Sea, Wildtrack and Nature. Soper also co-presented Animal Magic with Johnny Morris for a few years in the 1960s. He was also a supporter of the RSPB.

As Expedition Leader and a pioneer of wildlife cruising, he spent twenty years between 1992 and 2012 exploring both the North and South polar regions. He held a British yachtmaster's certificate and was a qualified compressed-air and oxygen hard-hat diver.

Soper's wife Hilary is a wildlife painter, and they had two sons. Soper died on 18 September 2024, at the age of 95.

== Honours ==
Soper was a recipient of the British Naturalists' Association's Peter Scott Memorial Award. He was awarded the British Trust for Ornithology's Dilys Breese Medal in 2009.

== DVDs ==
A single 23-minute episode of Wildtrack is available as a bonus feature on the DVD and Blu-ray release of David Attenborough's 1979 series Life on Earth.

== Selected bibliography ==
- The Bird Table Book (1965, several editions to 2006)
- The Shell Guide to Beachcombing (1972)
- Wildlife Begins at Home (1975)
- Everyday Birds (1976)
- Wildlife of The Dart Estuary (1982)
- Discovering Birds (1983)
- Penguins [with John Sparks] (1987)
- A Passion For Birds (1988)
- Owls [with John Sparks] (1995)
- Wildlife of the North Atlantic (2008)
- The Arctic: A Guide to Coastal Wildlife (2012)
- The Northwest Passage (2012)
- Antarctica: A Guide to the Wildlife (2013)
