= George Rainbird =

British publisher (1905–1986)

- Born: George Meadus Rainbird; 22 May 1905
- Died: 20 August 1986 (aged 81)
- Occupation: Publisher
- Known for: Founder of George Rainbird Ltd
- Spouses: Eva Warner; Joyce "Joy" Trinder; Lena Wickman
- Children: 6 (3 with Eva, 3 with Joy)

George Meadus Rainbird (22 May 1905 – 20 August 1986) was a British publisher, and the founder of the eponymous publishing house George Rainbird Ltd.

== Early life ==
He was born on 22 May 1905, the son of Leonard Rainbird and Sarah Rainbird nee Meadus.

== Career ==
Rainbird had been an advertising executive, before starting a career in publishing in 1951.

In 1951, he founded George Rainbird Ltd. It acquired Zaehnsdorf Ltd and Wigmore Bindery Ltd in 1954 to 1956. It merged with the Thomson Organization in 1965.

Edmund Fisher left W. H. Allen & Co. and joined Rainbird. After he retired and sold his publishing house to Roy Thomson, Fisher took over as its head, until Thomson appointed him as managing director of Michael Joseph, which Thomson had also acquired.

Rainbird was a director of Thomson Publications Ltd from 1966 to 1977, and its deputy chairman from 1973 to 1977. He was the chairman of Thomas Nelson & Sons Ltd, George Rainbird Ltd, Rainbird Reference Books Ltd, Sphere Books Ltd, and Michael Joseph Ltd, all from 1970 to 1975. He was the chairman of Westerham Press Ltd from 1972 to 1975; and Acanthus Press Ltd from 1979 until his death.

== Selected publications (as author) ==
- Escape to Sunshine, 1952
- A Pocket Book of Wine, 1963, (with Ronald Searle); reprinted as The Subtle Alchemist, 1973
- Sherry and the Wines of Spain, 1966
- An Illustrated Guide to Wine (Octopus Books Ltd, London, 1983)
- The Rainbird Archive, 1985

== Personal life ==
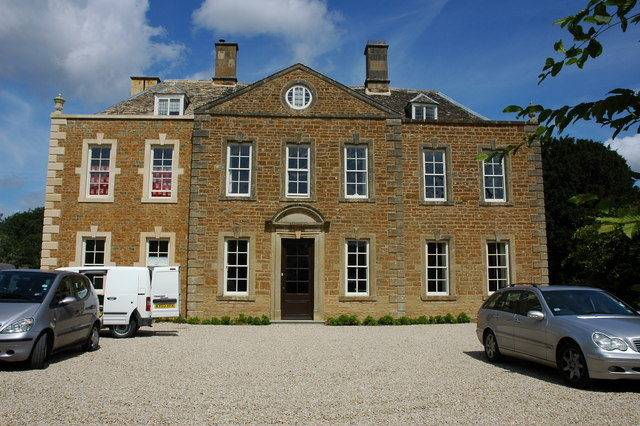
Whichford House

Rainbird's first marriage was in 1926, to Eva Warner, and they had a son and two daughters. His second marriage was in 1939, to Joyce "Joy" Trinder (died 1970), and they two sons and a daughter. In 1972, he married Lena Wickman (1917–1998), who survived him. Wickman was Swedish, and worked as a literary scout, and was best known for discovering John le Carré and his debut novel The Spy Who Came In From The Cold (1963), and lived in Bramerton Street, Chelsea, London.

In the 1950s, Rainbird bought Whichford House in the village of Whichford, Warwickshire, from the Church of England for £1,400, after it had ceased to be used as a rectory.

His wife Joy planned and planted the garden with the assistance of plantsman and designer, James Russell, and it was featured in Country Life. They were mainly based in London, and only visited at weekends and in the summer, although his "very old" father lived there year-round.

Later in life, he lived at The Old Parsonage, Church Street, Moreton-in-Marsh, Gloucestershire, and 45 Bramerton Street, Chelsea, London.

Rainbird died on 20 August 1986, aged 81.
