= James Russell (garden designer) =

James Russell (1920–1996) was an English garden designer. He was educated at Eton College and then went to Cambridge University. His education was interrupted by the Second World War, in which he served for three years. He was invalided from the army and then managed Sunningdale Nurseries; this had been purchased by his father and a cousin at the outbreak of the war. He revived the fortunes of the nursery and then started in a career of garden design. His first commission was for Lord Hastings at Seaton Delaval Hall in Northumberland. He later worked for the Howard family of Castle Howard in North Yorkshire. In the 1960s Russell worked with the wives of the 4th and 5th Dukes of Westminster in Eaton Hall, Cheshire, to develop the gardens that had been neglected for many years. He later worked with the garden designer Graham Stuart Thomas.
