= A Mystery for Mr. Bass =

1960 novel by Eleanor Cameron

- First edition
- Author: Eleanor Cameron
- Illustrator: Leonard Shortall
- Language: English
- Series: The Mushroom Planet Books
- Genre: Science fiction, Children's
- Publisher: Little, Brown and Company
- Publication date: 1960
- Publication place: United States
- Media type: Print (Hardcover)
- Pages: 229 pp
- Preceded by: Mr. Bass's Planetoid
- Followed by: Jewels from the Moon

A Mystery for Mr. Bass is a 1960 children's science fiction novel by Canadian author Eleanor Cameron. The novel followed The Wonderful Flight to the Mushroom Planet (1954), Stowaway to the Mushroom Planet (1956), Mr. Bass's Planetoid (1958), and it was illustrated by Leonard Shortall.

== Plot summary ==
After a record-breaking storm, David and Chuck discover half-million-year-old fossils on the cliffs near their homes where no such bones should be, prompting Tyco Bass to reveal some of the history and customs of the Mycetians, the Mushroom People of Earth. After Tyco's departure, the boys' discovery of the ailing Prewytt Brumblydge's unexpected Mycetian connections leads them to attempt a new, unscheduled trip to Basidium.

== See also ==
- Jewels from the Moon and the Meteor That Couldn't Stay, the sequel volume to this story.
