= First Men to the Moon =

1960 novella by Wernher von Braun

- First edition cover
- Author: Wernher von Braun
- Illustrator: Fred Freeman
- Cover artist: Fred Freeman
- Language: English
- Genre: Science fiction
- Publisher: Holt, Rinehart and Winston
- Publication date: 1960
- Publication place: United States
- Media type: Hardcover
- Pages: 96

First Men to the Moon is a novella by rocketry expert Wernher von Braun, published in 1960. The book was designed and illustrated by Fred Freeman. Portions of the novella had previously been serialized in the American syndicated Sunday magazine supplement, This Week between 1958 and 1959.

Von Braun dedicated the book to his daughters Iris and Margrit, "who will live in a world in which flights to the moon will be commonplace". It was included in The New York Times's "[100] Outstanding Books for Young Readers" on November 13, 1960 and was translated into German as Erste Fahrt zum Mond and French as Les premiers hommes sur la lune, both published in 1961.

First Men to the Moon tells the story of John Mason and Larry Carter, fictional astronauts traveling to the Moon. Von Braun based his novella on his own scientific knowledge and included technical explanations of the journey and diagrams in footnotes in wide margins on each page. The novella describes the use of a method of investigating the interior of the Moon using seismograph-equipped solid propellant rockets.

== Reception ==
In a review of First Men to the Moon in Galaxy Science Fiction, Floyd C. Gale said that the fictional trip to the Moon was "highly detailed and absorbing", and praised the "exceptional" illustrations. He added that "[e]ven the best grounded SF buff will find new and astonishing material over which to dream". Writing in The New York Times in 1960, Henry W. Hubbard described the story as "average", but called the book "a standout" because of the "authority" von Braun brings to it. Hubbard said the marginal notes on the science behind the journey to the Moon are "excellent" and it is that "scientific solidity" that "is the book's greatest value".

Reviewing the book in Amazing Stories, S. E. Cotts wrote that while it appears to target young adults, the technical details of the voyage will appeal to older readers. He felt that where von Braun adds science to the story, the characters tend to become "experimental robots", but when he discusses the science separately in the book's copious margins, the author brings the tale "alive with authority and interest". Science fiction writer and critic, P. Schuyler Miller described the book as a "thin hybrid" of science and fiction. In a review in Analog Science Fact & Fiction, Miller said the book is "[t]echnically impeccable", but felt it is school library material and "offers very little to adult readers who have any knowledge of science fiction". Miller did, however, compliment the technical discussions and diagrams in the wide margins, adding that it made the book "unusual and interesting."

== Works cited ==
- von Braun, Wernher (1960). First Men to the Moon. New York City: Holt, Rinehart and Winston.
