= Mr. Bass's Planetoid =

1958 novel by Eleanor Cameron

- First edition
- Author: Eleanor Cameron
- Illustrator: Louis Darling
- Language: English
- Series: The Mushroom Planet Books
- Genre: Science fiction Children's literature
- Publisher: Little, Brown and Company
- Publication date: 1958
- Publication place: United States
- Media type: Print (Hardcover)
- Pages: 227
- Preceded by: Stowaway to the Mushroom Planet
- Followed by: A Mystery for Mr. Bass

Mr. Bass's Planetoid is a 1958 children's science fiction novel by Canadian author Eleanor Cameron. The novel follows The Wonderful Flight to the Mushroom Planet (1954) and Stowaway to the Mushroom Planet (1956). The book is illustrated by Louis Darling.

== Plot introduction ==
The boys hunt for Prewytt Brumblydge, inventor of the Brumblitron, which is threatening to explode, destroying the Earth. This time, instead of journeying to Basidium, they fly to an airless rock named Lepton that orbits 1,000 miles above the Earth's surface. This novel introduces the fictional metal Brumblium, a greenish metal that shows as infragreen on a spectroscope and has twice the density of uranium.

== See also ==
- A Mystery for Mr. Bass, the sequel volume to this story
- "Men of Harlech", a Welsh song
