= Stowaway to the Mushroom Planet =

1956 novel by Eleanor Cameron

- First edition
- Author: Eleanor Cameron
- Illustrator: Robert Henneberger
- Language: English
- Series: The Mushroom Planet Books
- Genre: Science fiction Children's literature
- Publisher: Little, Brown and Company
- Publication date: 1956
- Publication place: United States
- Media type: Print (Hardcover)
- Pages: 226
- Preceded by: The Wonderful Flight to the Mushroom Planet
- Followed by: Mr. Bass's Planetoid

Stowaway to the Mushroom Planet is the second in the series of Mushroom Planet books by Eleanor Cameron, and was published in 1956, two years after The Wonderful Flight to the Mushroom Planet.

This children's book is set in a beach community in California, as well as on a tiny, habitable moon, "Basidium", in an invisible orbit 50,000 miles from Earth. The "Mushroom Planet," visited by the protagonists David and Chuck, is covered in various types of mushrooms and is populated by little green people.

== Plot summary ==
The story opens with Theo Bass, the cousin of Tyco Bass, coming to Pacific Grove, California, and visiting the two boys (Chuck and David) from the first book. He has been a traveler around the world for many years, and when he finds out about the mushroom planet, he decides to rebuild the boys' lost spaceship and return to what he knows is his ancestral home.

Earlier, the boys had written a letter to a nearby university professor inviting him to come and give a lecture to their young astronomers' society. The letter arrives while the professor is away and is received by his ambitious young assistant, who comes to Pacific Grove to give the lecture in the professor's stead.

The young assistant, Horatio Peabody, ends up going to the Mushroom Planet as a stowaway, and causing quite a bit of trouble there. This book is much more topical than the last one was, as Peabody insists that the Mushroom Planet must be explored and exploited "for the good of science" — as well as for his own personal glory. Mr. Peabody ends up committing an act of sacrilege on the Mushroom Planet that almost gets everyone involved killed, and in general annoys and scares all.

However, by the end of the book, Horatio Peabody learns his lesson about the arrogance of his scientific beliefs, and the situation, overall, returns to equilibrium until the next book.

== Other editions ==
- Polizón hacia el planeta de los hongos, Spanish language edition

== See also ==
- 1956 in science fiction
- Mr. Bass's Planetoid, the sequel volume to this story.
