= Margery Fisher =

British literary critic and academic

- Born: Margery Lilian Edith Fisher (née Turner); March 21, 1913 (age 113); Camberwell, London
- Died: December 24, 1992 (aged 78–79); Northampton, United Kingdom
- Occupations: Critic, author
- Spouse: James Fisher (1936-1970)
- Children: Edmund Fisher

Margery Lilian Edith Fisher (née Turner) (March 21, 1913 – December 24, 1992) was a British literary critic and academic. She promoted the importance of good literature for children through her books, lecture tours and her journal Growing Point. She was a recipient of the Eleanor Farjeon Award.

== Biography ==
She was born in Camberwell, London, in 1913, but spent her schooldays in New Zealand before returning to England to take up a place at Somerville College, Oxford where she graduated with First Class honours in English. After graduation, she taught English at a girls' school before moving to Oundle, an English public school for boys (1939–1945). She once confided that:

teaching straightforward boys, gently leading a football-thickie towards The Mayor of Casterbridge was far more enjoyable than dealing with devious girls as a new graduate before the war.

By the 1950s, married to the British naturalist James Fisher and raising six children of their own, including the publisher Edmund Fisher, she was able to indulge her voracious passion for children's literature as a freelance book reviewer for magazines. This led to the publication in 1961 of her authoritative guide, Intent Upon Reading. In 1962, the first issue of her own journal, Growing Point, appeared, described as "Margery Fisher's regular review of books for the growing families of the English reading world and for readers, teachers, librarians and other guardians". Its publication nine times a year continued uninterrupted for the next 30 years. It ceased publication in 1992, a few months before her death.

== Legacy ==
Her papers for the period 1937–1992 are held in the Department of Special Collections at the University of California.

== Works ==
- 1961 — Intent upon Reading: A Critical Appraisal of Modern Fiction for Children. Leicester: Brockhampton Press.
- 1965 — Open the Door. Leicester: Brockhampton Press. (A collection of writing for young children edited and presented by Margery Fisher)
- 1975 — Who's Who in Children's Books: A Treasury of the Familiar Characters of Childhood. London: Weidenfeld & Nicolson. ISBN 978-0-2977-7037-4 ("Elucidates the distinctive qualities and circumstances of popular, important, and interesting central characters of children's books and stories, and their creator's techniques, from King Alfred and Alice to Winnie-the-Pooh and the Wombles.")
- 1976 — Intent upon Reading: A Critical Appraisal of Modern Fiction for Children (revised edition). London: Hodder and Stoughton. ISBN 978-0-340-03510-8.
