= Amateur Gardening (magazine) =

UK weekly magazine about gardening

- Cover of 11 May 2024, 140th anniversary issue
- Editor: Kim Stoddart
- Frequency: Fortnightly
- Circulation: 28,749 (ABC July–December 2016); Print and digital editions.
- Founded: 1884
- Company: Kelsey Media
- Country: United Kingdom
- Based in: Yalding, Kent
- Website: www.amateurgardening.co.uk

Amateur Gardening is a British fortnightly magazine dedicated to gardening. It includes news, advice, feature articles, and celebrity columns and interviews.

== History and the early years ==
Amateur Gardening was founded in London in May 1884 by Shirley Hibberd, who edited it until 1887. At the time of the magazine's brief closure in 2023 (see below), it was the oldest UK gardening weekly magazine, and was Britain's bestseller in that category in 2013. The magazine was published once a week. Its editorial offices were in Farnborough, Hampshire.

At the time of the magazine's launch in 1884 there had been several other notable gardening magazines in circulation, including the Gardeners' Chronicle and Gardens Illustrated, but these were tailored more to the professional gardener. Amateur Gardening is considered the first paper designed specifically for the amateur.

The founders were two brothers, W. H. and L. Collingridge, who also produced other periodicals of the time, including the well-known City Press.

The first issue of Amateur Gardening consisted of 16 pages, 12 of which were devoted to editorial matter. The first editor, Shirley Hibberd, was a botanist and an academic authority on gardening. He included in the magazine articles which were thought by many to be too technical. He remained the editor for only two years.

The man who really established Amateur Gardening was T. W. Sanders, who remained editor for 40 years. Sanders knew exactly what the new generation of amateur gardeners wanted, and his style of editing attracted a wide audience. Before the First World War, a circulation of 100,000 copies per week had been achieved, although this fell off considerably during the war. Not until the mid-1920s did the circulation rise to a healthy level again.

Sanders also wrote a large number of books, most notably Sanders' Encyclopaedia of Gardening. This was the "bible" for several generations of gardeners and is consulted even today.

In 1926, the magazine suffered a severe blow when Sanders died. The assistant editor, A. J. Macself, was able to take over as editor and steer the magazine through another 20 years of what was probably the most turbulent period in its history.

In 1934 Macself presided over the title's 50th birthday party, celebrating in grand style with a dinner for more than 300 people in the New Connaught Rooms in London's Mayfair. The guest list included Lord Aberconway, the then President of the Royal Horticultural Society, Sir Austen Chamberlain (a former Chancellor of the Exchequer) and Lord Riddell (a director of the Collingridge publishing firm, and a personal friend of former Prime Minister David Lloyd George).

In June 1940 the magazine left its offices in the City and moved to the Country Life Building in Covent Garden.

Macself was a member of the original Hardy Plant Society and a renowned expert in ferns. Arguably he was even more prolific as a writer than Sanders. Between 1933 and 1939 he launched a series of gift books, as well as an annual and a calendar, besides writing numerous ordinary gardening books.

He carried on editing through World War II, even though paper restrictions had dramatically limited the size of the magazine. During this period Amateur Gardening put its full weight behind the national Dig for Victory campaign, which encouraged everyone to grow their own fruits and vegetables to combat the wartime shortages.

== Boom ==
When Macself retired in 1946, he was succeeded by Arthur Hellyer, hitherto the assistant editor. Hellyer had joined the magazine in 1929, and was charming, knowledgeable and hardworking. He retired in 1967. During his years as editor he also contributed weekly to the Financial Times and regularly to Country Life and many other publications – and he wrote innumerable books.

Hellyer took over at a great time on the magazine's history. Paper restrictions were lifted during the 1950s and 1960s, and the magazine enjoyed a boom, the like of which had never been seen before or since. Circulation rose to a staggering 300,000 copies per week, and issues regularly contained some 124 pages. Remarkably, by 1967 when Hellyer retired, the magazine had been in business for 83 years, but had only had four editors.

For the first hundred years of the magazine's life it seemed to be the norm that when an editor stopped, his role was taken over by the assistant editor. This happened again when Hellyer retired, as his assistant, Anthony Huxley, took on the role. He was the son of the writer Julian Huxley, and a nephew of the philosopher and writer Aldous Huxley, who wrote Brave New World in 1932. Anthony was also the great-grandson of Thomas Henry Huxley, a renowned biologist who defended Darwin's theory of evolution when it was receiving considerable criticism.

Huxley was a keen and knowledgeable plantsman, and although he was supportive of amateurs generally, he was more interested in botanical integrity and ecology, particularly in the cultivation of house plants. He introduced the use of bottle gardens to the UK, and in 1956 exhibited the first ever bottle garden at the Chelsea Flower Show. He was editor for just four years; in 1971 he left to devote his time to book writing and freelance journalism.

The post of editor was taken over by assistant editor Peter Wood, who had been a student at the RHS garden at Wisley in the early 1950s, and had come to Amateur Gardening straight after his diploma course finished. He started off in the department helping to answer the thousands of readers' queries that arrived by post each year. During his editorship, Wood steered the magazine through the technological revolution (the introduction of computers) and the turbulent periods of industrial unrest in the 1970s. There were several times when Amateur Gardening was printed with blank white pages, when the printers refused to deal with pages that had been written by, or contained pictures from people who were not members of specific trade unions.

Wood also presided over the magazine's centenary celebrations in 1984. With garden designer Roger Sweetinburgh, he drew up the plans for a Victorian garden at the Chelsea Flower Show – and won a Gold Medal for it. There was also a centenary lunch at RHS Wisley Garden, with a ceremonial tree-planting. It was a much lower-key event than the 50th birthday celebrations, but this was the recession-hit Thatcher era. Budgets for big parties were tighter.

In 1979, Wood was instrumental in moving the magazine out of London, to Poole in Dorset.

== Recent years ==
Wood retired from the magazine in 1985, and was replaced by Jack Kendall, a journalist who worked on Practical Householder (a sister magazine to Amateur Gardening). He was not an experienced gardener, but was a good organiser and writer. Shortly after he started, Kendall was diagnosed with terminal cancer, and he died just 10 months later.

For much of the time Kendall was being treated for cancer, the magazine's deputy, Graham Clarke, had been acting editor, and upon Kendall's death he was appointed editor. Clarke had been born into horticulture as his father had been a Superintendent (today known as a Manager) of Regent's Park in the centre of London. For all of Clarke's childhood he had lived in a lodge within the Queen Mary Rose Garden. When a teenager, he and his family moved to Hyde Park, London's most famous open space. After completing school he studied horticulture at the Royal Horticultural Society's Wisley Garden in Surrey. Theory and practical qualifications lead him to a year working in the garden at Buckingham Palace, following by a stint working in the commercial glasshouse nursery for the Central Royal Parks. In 1976 he moved into journalism, joining Amateur Gardening as a trainee sub-editor. He rose through the ranks, and took over as editor in 1986.

During Clarke's 11-year tenure as editor, he also launched a monthly version of Amateur Gardening (which was called Your Garden), and Clarke became group editor (over this and The Gardener, another monthly magazine which had been bought from one of the companies that had suffered under the hands of publisher Robert Maxwell).

In 1997 Clarke took on a more business-oriented role at the magazine. The National Amateur Gardening Show, which was held annually between 1996 and 2008, was an idea conceived by Clarke, along with the magazine's then marketing manager Robyn Perrin. The Show was a partnership with the Royal Bath and West Showground, Shepton Mallet, and was held annually in September. After the magazine withdrew from the Show in 2008, it continued for a further four years and was held for the last time in 2012.

In 1997, to mark the forthcoming Millennium, Clarke launched the Allotments 2000 campaign, which called for – and achieved – a Parliamentary Inquiry into the future of allotment gardening. Clarke and deputy editor Adrian Bishop both gave evidence at the Inquiry into the current state of allotments in the UK. The Allotments 2000 campaign later won Clarke and Bishop the Campaign of the Year award from the Periodical Publishers Association (PPA).

When Clarke moved from the editor's chair in 1997, the editorship passed on to Bishop. He had been a journalist for local newspapers, and under his leadership Amateur Gardening enjoyed tighter news coverage of gardening matters, and a more celebrity-based style. In 2001 he was promoted simultaneously to editor-in-chief and publisher, which lead the way for the current deputy editor to move up, and Tim Rumball took over the reins. Under Rumball the magazine overtook many of its long-standing rivals, and consolidated its position as the leading general gardening magazine on the news stands. As editor he has been a guest a number of times on BBC's Gardeners' Question Time, and has appeared on TV many times. He instigated (and presented) the first Amateur Gardening DVD.

In 2017 the parent company, Time Inc (UK) Ltd, decided to move the magazine from its south coast-based office in Poole, to the company's headquarters at Farnborough in Hampshire. At the same time, Rumball decided it was time to retire. He was replaced by Garry Coward-Williams, who had been Rumball's Group Editor. Coward-Williams had been steering much of the editorial content and presentation for several years, and now as Editor he is able to mould the magazine so that it can compete effectively in a difficult market (for all printed magazines, owing to online content being readily available).

== List of editors ==
The list of editors since the magazine's launch are as follows: Shirley Hibberd (1884–1886), T. W. Sanders (1886–1926), A. J. Macself (1926–1946), Arthur Hellyer (1946–1967), Anthony Huxley (1967–1971), Peter Wood (1971–1985), Jack Kendall (1985–1986), Graham Clarke (1986–1997), Adrian Bishop (1997–2001), Tim Rumball (2001–2017) and Garry Coward-Williams (since 2017). Notable writers for the magazine have included Alan Titchmarsh, who also served as deputy editor, Monty Don, Charlie Dimmock, Bob Flowerdew, Anne Swithinbank, Percy Thrower and Peter Seabrook. The cottage gardener Margery Fish was a columnist for the magazine in the 1950s.

== Owners of the Amateur Gardening brand ==
In the 1930s the original owners of Amateur Gardening, the Collingridge company, sold the business to the larger Newnes and Pearson publishing group. In the 1960s, this company merged with Odhams, a publisher famous for its newspapers and magazines. Eventually, The Mirror Group acquired Odhams, which resulted in one large company with many dozens of magazines under its belt. It relaunched itself as the International Publishing Corporation, better known as IPC. In 2013 the IPC name disappeared when its owner, US-based Time Inc, renamed it Time Inc (UK) Ltd.

In 2018, Time Inc (UK) Ltd became TI Media.

In 2020, Future plc became the owner of Amateur Gardening after the acquisition of TI Media was completed.

== Brief Closure ==
In September 2023, it was announced that the magazine was to permanently cease publication. The last edition was 14 October 2023. Future plc, the magazine's owner, blamed rising costs such as print costs and the free packet of seeds attached to every front cover along with decreasing advertising revenue for the decision to permanently close the magazine, reasons which were again cited in the final editorial by Garry Coward-Williams, the magazine's 11th and final editor.

== Revival under new ownership ==
The magazine was subsequently bought and taken over by Kelsey Media in November 2023 with new editor Kim Stoddart, who said at the time: "It is an absolute honour to be appointed as the latest editor of this iconic, gem of a magazine. I can't wait to share the first relaunch issue which will include many of the brilliant, regular contributors, plus some exciting new features and columns besides." The acquisition also reunited the magazine with Amateur Photographer and World Soccer (both owned by Kelsey since 2020), for the first time since TI Media era.

The magazine celebrated its 140th anniversary with 11 May 2024 bumper issue.

== See also ==
- List of horticultural magazines
