= Counterpoint (radio programme) =

- Genre: Quiz show
- Running time: 30 minutes
- Country of origin: United Kingdom
- Language: English
- Home station: BBC Radio 4
- Starring: Ned Sherrin (1986–2006); Edward Seckerson (2007); Paul Gambaccini (2008–2013, 2014–); Russell Davies (Stand in, 2013–14)
- Original release: 1986 – present
- Opening theme: Bach: Partita in E Major
- Website: Counterpoint

Counterpoint is a BBC Radio 4 quiz. Described in the show's introduction as "The general knowledge music quiz", the questions are about music, from classical, jazz, pop, musicals, and all other forms of music. It was originally hosted by Ned Sherrin (1986–2006). In the chair for the 2007 series was Edward Seckerson with Paul Gambaccini taking over in 2008, following the death of Ned Sherrin in 2007. Russell Davies took over temporarily in 2013 following allegations made against Gambaccini, who returned to the show in November 2014 after being cleared of the allegations.

== Format ==
The quiz is played by three contestants over three rounds, or "movements" as they are known in the show.

=== First round ===
In the first round, each contestant is asked four (or occasionally three if there is a shortage of time) questions, two of which are illustrated by short musical pieces. Two points are awarded for a correct answer, or one point for a partially correct response. If the given answer is incorrect, or partially incorrect, the other two contestants may buzz in for one point. If there is a tie at the end of the first round, a further buzzer question is asked to determine the contestants' order for the next round.

=== Second round ===
The middle round is a solo round, similar to the 'specialist subject' format of Mastermind, with the difference that the contestants have neither chosen nor been given warning of the subject. Five categories of questions are offered, some of which are very specific e.g. "Beethoven's Piano Sonatas", while others are more general, for instance "sunshine and rain". The contestant with the most points after round one chooses from the five categories, the runner-up chooses from the four remaining, and the contestant in last place chooses from the three that are left. Each round consists of seven (occasionally six) questions, including three musical cues. Again two points are given for a correct answer, but, in this round, questions answered incorrectly are not offered to the other contestants.

=== Third round ===
The final round consists of a variable number of questions. Any contestant can answer these questions, provided they buzz in first. A correct answer will add one point to a contestant's score. If an incorrect answer is given, a contestant is deducted one point. For the 2020–2021 season and for some episodes in the 2021–2022 season this was changed to a quickfire timed round for each contestant.

The contestant with the highest score at the end of each regular show wins the right to appear again, later in the series, to compete against other winners from the current series. The series is completed in 13 episodes, the last show being the final, at the end of which the series' winner is decided.

== Broadcast history ==
The show has been broadcast in BBC Radio 4's Monday afternoon quiz slot since 1998 with a repeat on the following Saturday evening. Three main question-setters have been used by the programme: Ian Gillies, often referred to as Mycroft by Robert Robinson in Brain of Britain (1986–2000); David Kenrick, the 1993 champion (1993 – )referred to as ' Clever Mr Kochel ' by Ned Sherrin; and Stephen Follows a semi-finalist 1996 ( 2002 - ). 'Counterpoint' has been produced since 2001 by Paul Bajoria. Russell Davies hosted the programme between November 2013 and October 2014 after Gambaccini was arrested on suspicion of historic sexual offences. Gambaccini returned in November 2014 after no charges were brought against him.

== Champions ==
The following is an incomplete list of Counterpoint champions since 1988.

Year	Champion
1988	Andrew Rothwell
1992	Ian Sutton
1993	David Kenrick
1994	James Eccleson
1995	Geoff Thomas
1996	Peter French
1997	Richard Newbold
1999	David Hunt
2001	Andrew Rothwell
2004	Paul Steeples
2005	John Taylor
2006	Graham Holliday
2007	John Wrigley
2008	Brian Davies
2009	David Roy
2010	Andy Langley
2011	Anthony Dean
2012	Michael Pitwood
2013	Wilson Bain
2014	Stephen Whitaker
2015	Dan Adler
2016	Tim Adkin
2017	Richard Searle
2018	David Sherman
2019	Brian Thompson
2021	Steven Lodge
2022	Frankie Fanko
2023	Kathryn Johnson
2024	Annie Hodkinson
2025	Sarah Trevarthen
2026	Greg Butler

== Theme music ==
The current Counterpoint theme is Bach's "Partita in E major", arranged and performed by Jacques Loussier. The original theme tune for the programme, when it began in 1986, was The Arrival of the Queen of Sheba by Georg Friedrich Handel. In the late 1990s it was opened by a specially commissioned piece entitled "Counterpoint", by musician Ray Davies.
