= All Time Top 1000 Albums =

Book by Colin Larkin

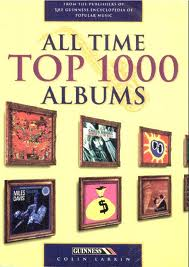
- Book cover of the first edition of All Time Top 1000 Albums
- Author: Colin Larkin
- Language: English
- Subject: Music, reference work
- Genre: non-fiction
- Publisher: Virgin Books
- Publication date: 2000
- Publication place: United Kingdom
- Pages: 320
- ISBN: 0-7535-0493-6
- Preceded by: All Time Top 1000 Albums 1st Edition, All Time Top 1000 Albums 2nd Edition

All Time Top 1000 Albums is a book by Colin Larkin, creator and editor of the Encyclopedia of Popular Music. The book was first published by Guinness Publishing in 1994. The list presented is the result of over 200,000 votes cast by the public in record shops, universities, schools and the French music trade show MIDEM – and ranked in order. Each album's entry is accompanied by an annotation with a 100-word review, details of its creation, and notes about the band or artist who recorded it.

The Beatles' Sgt. Pepper's Lonely Hearts Club Band album made the top spot in the first edition, and the same band's Revolver made the top spot in the second, third and pocket editions of the series.

== Background ==
In 1987, radio presenter Paul Gambaccini asked approximately 80 critics and disc jockeys from the United Kingdom and United States to list their ten greatest albums of all time. From these lists, he compiled the Top 100 Albums which was subsequently published by Pavilion Books in 1987. In 1993, Larkin was approached by Today newspaper to update this list, which was published in the newspaper. As a consequence, Larkin suggested the idea of a Top 1000 albums book to his publisher. Unlike the Gambaccini list, Larkin wanted to compile a list from votes cast by "broader opinion", and in keeping with the genres used in the Encyclopedia of Popular Music. Larkin set about polling several thousand people via a printed voting form, left in record shops and sent to schools and universities. The result was the first edition of the All Time Top 1000 Albums, published in 1994.

In 1998 the second edition was published by Virgin Books using the continuing votes received over the previous four years. As a result of the publicity garnered by the encyclopedia and the first edition, Larkin was able to ask for votes during his numerous radio broadcasts for BBC GLR, now BBC London 94.9. He collected 100,000 votes, and the 2nd edition sold 38,000 copies. In 1999, Virgin published a smaller pocket edition, followed by a 3rd edition published in 2000, by which time the ongoing poll had reached over 200,000 votes cast. In September 2000, BBC News Online reported the "head-to-head" battle between the Beatles and Radiohead, the two bands who took the top four positions on the list.

== Editions ==
- Larkin, Colin, ed. (1994). All Time Top 1000 Albums (1st ed.). London: Guinness Publishing. ISBN 0-85112-786-X – via the Internet Archive.
- Larkin, Colin, ed. (1998). All Time Top 1000 Albums (2nd ed.). London: Virgin Books. ISBN 0-7535-0258-5 – via the Internet Archive.
  - Larkin, Colin, ed. (1999). All Time Top 1000 Albums (2nd, pocket ed.). London: Virgin Books. ISBN 0-7535-0354-9 – via the Internet Archive.
- Larkin, Colin, ed. (2000). All Time Top 1000 Albums (3rd ed.). London: Virgin Books. ISBN 0-7535-0493-6.

== See also ==
- Album era
