= Sowerbutts =

Sowerbutts may refer to:

- Bill Sowerbutts (1911–1990), British radio panellist
- Joe Sowerbutts (born 1988), British actor
- Joe Sowerbutts (footballer) (1863–1935), Blackburn Rovers football player
- Grace Sowerbutts, the principal witness at the trial of the Samlesbury witches in 1612
