= Daphne Ledward =

British gardener

Daphne Ledward (born 1945), known as Daffers when she appeared on Sir Jimmy Young's show on BBC Radio 2, is an English garden designer and author and former gardening presenter for the BBC.

== Early life ==
She was born in Bradford in West Yorkshire. At the age of three she moved to Essex. Her parents separated and she moved with her mother to south Lincolnshire.

She attended Stamford High School, then a direct grant grammar school. She grew up in Easton on the Hill. She passed nine O levels in 1961, under headmistress Miss Joyce Lomax She played in a string quartet with Carolyn Bishop, Mary Nalson and Susan Capp, in the sixth form. She left at the end of the lower sixth. She had originally wanted to become a vet, but in the 1960s such careers were not encouraged for women.

She began training as a quantity surveyor at the College of Estate Management via a correspondence course. However, she felt this was not the right course for her. She had some time in hospital, and decided that she wanted to work in the social occupations. She became a Welfare Assistant with Kesteven County Council. Six months later she became District Welfare Officer for South Kesteven. In 1971 there was a reorganisation in administration of the department she was working for and she decided to leave. She wrote short stories for women's and teenage magazines.

== Gardening ==
She undertook a gardening correspondence course, and having got to know a nurseryman in 1972, she started her own business in landscape gardening. She originally wanted to design the gardens and let customers plant and change the landscaping themselves, but customers generally wanted the whole thing done for them. In 1973 she worked for Brian Ellis Mailing Services in Bedford, and in 1974 she started her own business, which sent plants by direct mail. The mail services were provided by the Bedford company. The company was not as lucrative as hoped for, so Ledward concentrated on landscape gardening.

=== Broadcasting and publications ===
In 1980 Ledward became the gardening presenter for the newly established BBC Radio Lincolnshire; she appeared with Chris Olney on Monday afternoons, with The Answer Lies in the Soil.

In 1982 she became the first female panel-member of Radio 4's Gardeners' Question Time, and in 1988 she answered gardening questions with Geoffrey Smith on Gardeners' Direct Line Postbag for BBC Leeds.; on Sunday 20 February 1983 she appeared on Gardeners' Question Time at Long Bennington, with Bill Sowerbutts, hosted by Ken Ford (the presenter from 1977), recorded on Tuesday 8 February 1983; other appearances on Gardeners Question Time included the United Reformed Church at Darras Hall (Ponteland, Northumberland) on 23 October 1983; the church hall of Holy Ascension Church, Upton-by-Chester, recorded 4 January 1984; Barnack primary school hall, recorded on Wednesday 15 February 1984, broadcast 11 March 1984; Tewin Memorial Hall, recorded on 12 September 1984, broadcast on 14 October 1984; Munster Park Methodist Church Hall in Fulham, recorded on Thursday 18 April 1985, broadcast on 12 May 1985; the South Holland Centre in Spalding, recorded on Thursday 30 May 1985, broadcast on 23 June 1985; and the Royal Oak, Ockbrook, recorded on Thursday 20 February 1986, broadcast on 2 March 1986.

She was also well known for being the resident gardening expert on Sir Jimmy Young's long running lunchtime show on BBC Radio 2 between 1988 and 2002. In 2001 she presented her own TV series, Garden Hopping, seen on BBC2. In 2002 she was co-presenter with Joe Swift of Grow to Eat. Her BBC career ended in 2009.

She has written gardening books, including The Idiot Gardener's Handbook.

== Personal life ==
She married Anthony Twitchett in Bourne, Lincolnshire in 1976; in the 1970s she moved to Deeping St James.

Since 1992 she has been married to John Hands, who was a sound engineer for BBC Midlands; she married in July 1992 at the Wesley Grove Methodist Church in Jersey. They have a thatched cottage in Surfleet Seas End near Spalding, and keep greyhounds.
