= Arthur Hellyer =

English horticulturist

Arthur George Lee Hellyer (16 December 1902 – 28 January 1993) was a well-known British horticulturalist.

== Career ==
=== Gardening books and encyclopaedias ===
In the course of a long public career, Hellyer wrote an extremely large number (over 100) of influential gardening books: one of the first, The Alphabet of Gardening, subtitled a Complete Concise and Comprehensive Guide to Practical Gardening was published in 1927; one of the last, the Hellyer Gardening Encyclopedia, was published in 1993, not long before his death. His titles were often ambitious, but the contents of his books were always as comprehensive as the claims in his 'encyclopaedias', 'directories', 'diaries' and 'guides'. Some of his books covered single plants, such as Chrysanthemums (1958), Roses (1957), Dahlias (1963) and Tomatoes (1954). Some covered specific aspects or problems, as Plant Propagation (1955), Herbaceous Borders (1955), or Garden Pests and Diseases (1964). Others enticed the amateur gardener with titles such as Practical Gardening for Amateurs (1966), or Starting with Roses (1966). His knowledge was always practical, whatever the subject. Hellyer pioneered the intensive use of illustrations in gardening books, with titles such as Flowers in Colour (1965) and a series of Amateur Gardening Picture Books published by Collingridge.

Noted gardener Vita Sackville-West, in her book Even More For Your Garden, wrote "should you wish for something more elaborate and also more expensive, let me recommend 'Gardens of Britain,' by A. G. L. Hellyer, published by Country Life at 30s. Illustrated by over 200 large photographs, this volume by one of the best and most authoritative writers on gardening matters describes nearly 100 gardens in private ownership but open to the public. It makes a wonderful present either to give or to receive."

=== Promoting gardening ===
Hellyer worked for Amateur Gardening magazine from 1929 to 1966, and edited that magazine for 21 years; he also contributed gardening columns to the Financial Times, Country Life magazine, and Homes and Gardens magazine. According to Alan Boon, Hellyer asked Thomas W. Sanders "what prospects there were for a young man in horticultural journalism.T.W.S. replied, None whatsoever. I have an assistant who has been with me for 30 years, and when he dies I shall require one replacement. As it happened, Hellyer worked 16 years with the self same assistant (named H.A. Smith) before he retired."

Hellyer was a founder of the Hardy Plant Society.

== Select bibliography ==
- A.G.L. Hellyer. Amateur Gardening: Pocket Guide. Treasure Press. 4th Edition, 1989. ISBN 978-1-85051-492-3.
- A.G.L. Hellyer. Your Garden Week by Week. Collingridge, 1956.
- A.G.L. Hellyer. Gardening Through the Year. Littlehampton, 1983. ISBN 978-0-600-30550-7.
- A.G.L. Hellyer. Hellyer Gardening Encyclopedia. Hamlyn, 1993. ISBN 978-0-600-57645-7.
- A.G.L. Hellyer. Lawn Care. Hamlyn, 1986. ISBN 978-0-600-30717-4.
- A.G.L. Hellyer. Climbing and Wall Plants. Collins, 1988. ISBN 978-0-00-412392-9.
- A.G.L. Hellyer. Garden Adviser. Macdonald, 1984. ISBN 978-0-356-10417-1.
- A.G.L. Hellyer. Gardening Book. Littlehampton, 1972. ISBN 978-0-600-30081-6.
- A.G.L. Hellyer. Gardens of Genius. Littlehampton, 1980. ISBN 978-0-600-34086-7.
- A.G.L. Hellyer. Illustrated Encyclopaedia of Gardening. Littlehampton, 1982. ISBN 978-0-600-36818-2.
- A.G.L. Hellyer. Gardens to Visit in Britain. Littlehampton, 1970. ISBN 978-0-600-44179-3.
- Thomas William Sanders and A.G.L. Hellyer. The Alphabet of Gardening: a Complete Concise and Comprehensive Guide to Practical Gardening. Collingridge, ninth edition, 1927.
