= Pippa Greenwood =

British botanist

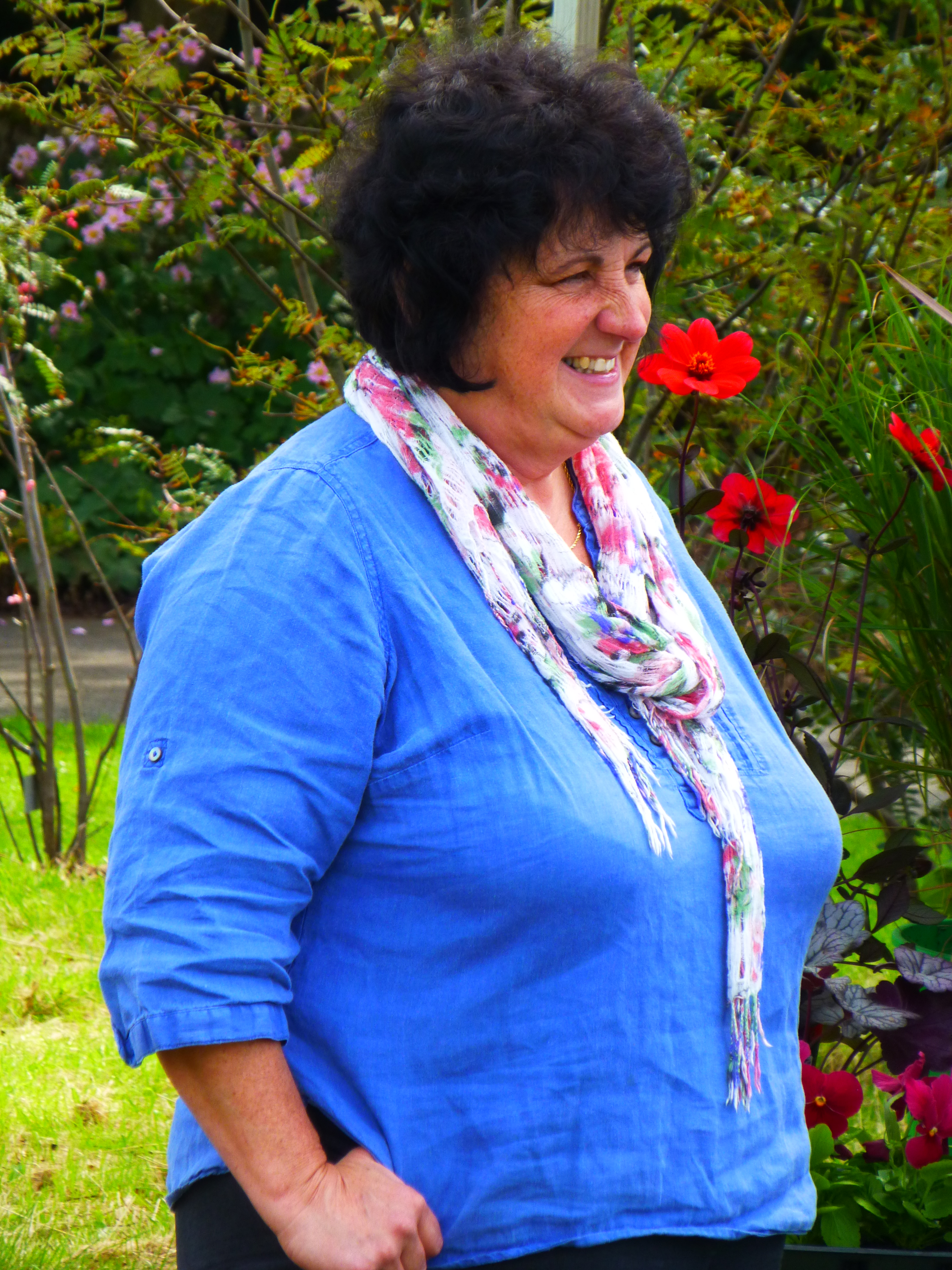
Pippa Greenwood in 2012

Pippa Greenwood is an English plant pathologist and television and radio presenter. She appears frequently on the BBC's long-running Gardeners' World television programme and has been a regular panellist on Gardeners' Question Time on BBC Radio 4 since 1994. She also was the gardening consultant on the ITV series Rosemary and Thyme in 2003–2006. Greenwood was awarded an honorary doctorate by Durham University.

== Qualifications and career ==
Greenwood was born in London. Greenwood studied at Durham University, where she trained as a botanist. She went on to gain an MSc in crop protection at Reading University in the 1980s. For eleven years, from 1985, she ran the Royal Horticultural Society's Plant Pathology Department at Wisley.

She began working for the BBC in 1988, beginning with the gardening slot on Daytime Live. She appears frequently on the BBC's long-running Gardeners' World television programme and has been a regular panellist on Gardeners' Question Time on BBC Radio 4 since 1994. She also was the gardening consultant on the ITV series Rosemary and Thyme in 2003–2006. In 2000–2002 she presented the series Growing Science on Radio 4.

Greenwood writes gardening columns in Ideal Home Magazine and the Daily Mirror, and has written a number of gardening books.

In 2007, Greenwood made a return visit to Durham University, where she was awarded an honorary doctorate.

Greenwood is married with two children, and lives outside Petersfield in Hampshire, in the South Downs. She is President of Petersfield in Bloom, and Patron of Hampshire's only wildlife hospital, Hart Wildlife, near Medstead.

== Bibliography ==
- Gardener's Question Time: All Your Gardening Problems Solved, with co-authors John Cushnie, Bob Flowerdew, Bunny Guinness, Anne Swithinbank, illustrations by Bunny Guinness, and photographs from The Garden Picture Gallery and others, paperback, 325 pp., Bookmart Limited, 2005, ISBN 1-84509-189-2
