= Stamford High School, Lincolnshire =

Stamford High School
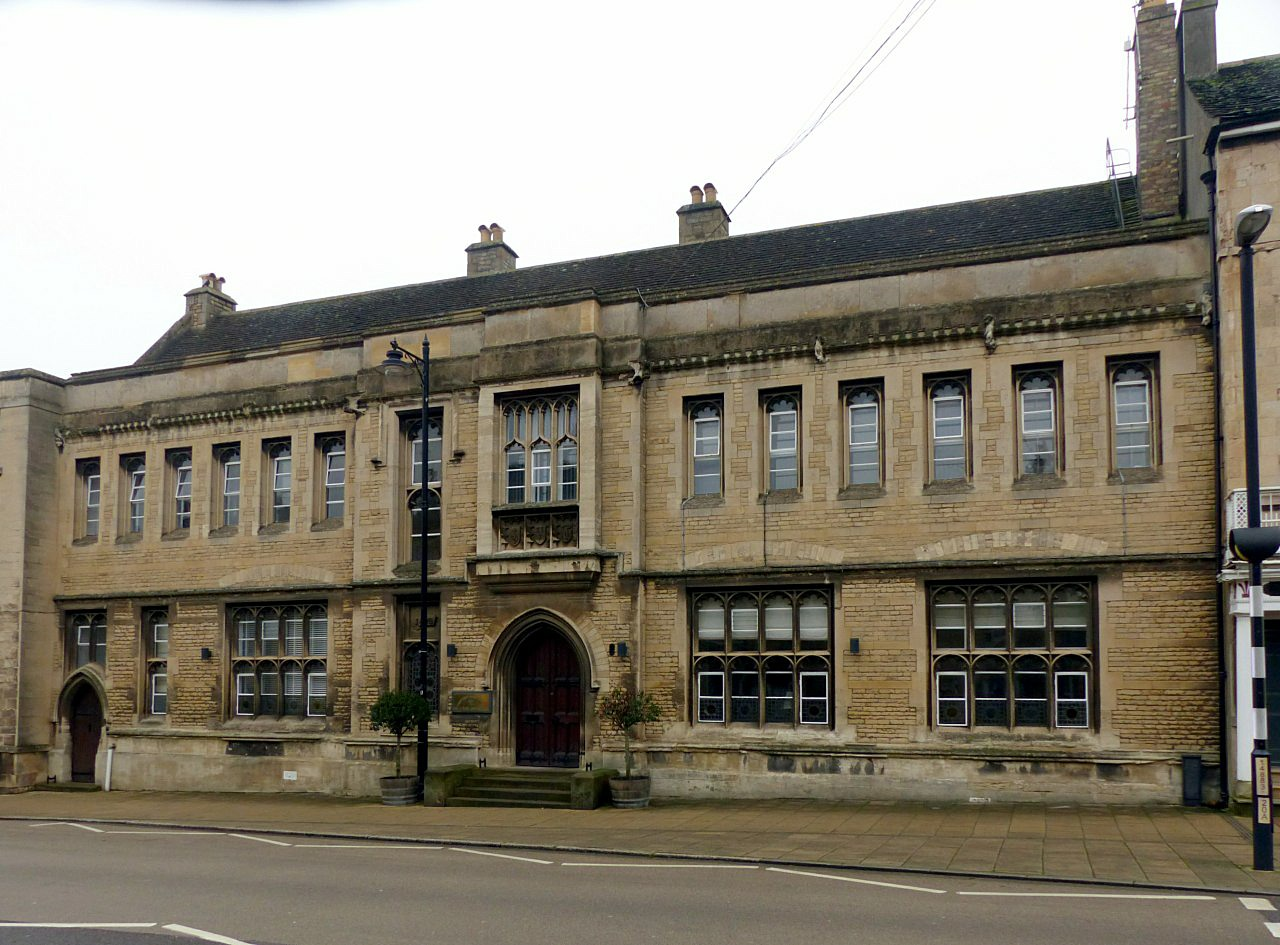

Location
- High Street, St Martin's Without; Stamford, Lincolnshire, PE9 2LL; England; 52.65520°N 0.47166°W

Information
- Type: Public school, day and boarding
- Motto: Christ me Spede
- Established: 1877
- Founder: William Radcliffe
- Closed: 2023 (merged with Stamford School)
- Local authority: Lincolnshire
- Gender: All
- Age: 11 to 18
- Houses: Eliot, Cavell, Beale and Anderson. Boarding – Welland, St Martin’s, Park and Wothorpe
- Colours: Red and navy blue
- Publication: The High School Herald
- Website: stamfordschools.org.uk

Stamford High School, founded in 1877, was an independent school for girls in Stamford, Lincolnshire, England. It was a sister school to the boys' Stamford School. In 2023, the two schools were merged to form one co-educational Stamford School.

== Education ==
Stamford High School provided education for students aged 11 (year 7) to 18 (year 13). From 2000 until 2023, sixth-form teaching was carried out jointly with Stamford School. The school belonged to the Stamford Endowed Schools, a member of the Headmasters' and Headmistresses' Conference.

== History ==
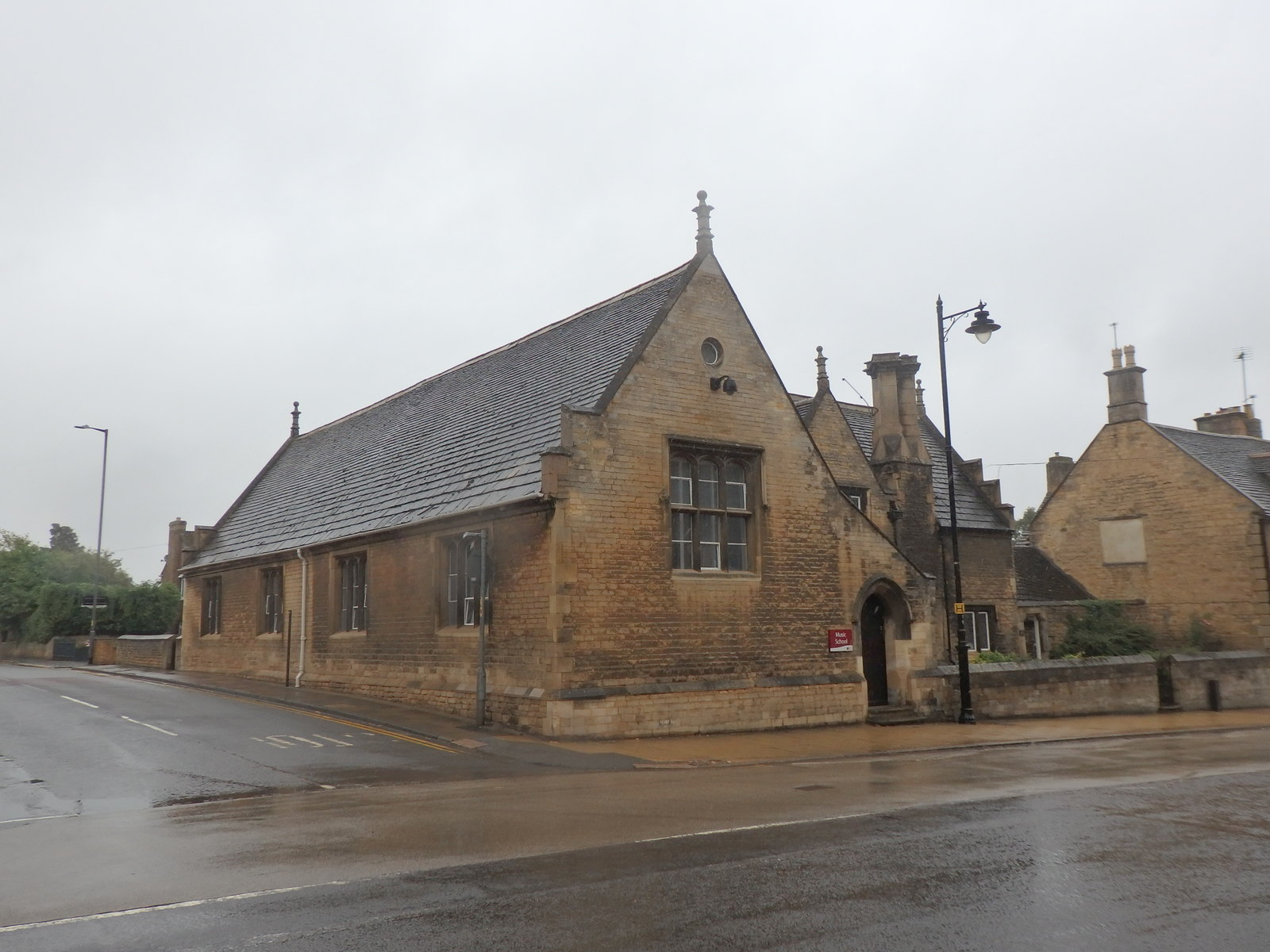
Stamford High School's music school

The school was formally opened on 6 December 1877 by the Home Secretary, Richard Cross and called Browne’s Middle School for Girls. Also in attendance were the Marquess and Marchioness of Exeter, the Mayor of Stamford, the MP for Stamford, and the Bishop of Peterborough.

The school stood on its original site on High Street, St Martin's, in the part of the town of Stamford south of the River Welland. The building was erected on the site of the old Daniel Lambert Inn.

The funds for the foundation of the high school were appropriated from the endowment of Browne's Hospital by Act of Parliament in 1871, from a trust by William Browne for the relief of poverty. William Browne (1410–1489) had been a wealthy wool merchant and alderman of the town of Stamford.

In 1888, the school's name was changed to Stamford High School for Girls on Browne’s Foundation.

=== Second World War ===
During the Second World War, 117 girls from the coeducational Mundella Grammar School were evacuated to Stamford. They arrived by train on 5 September 1939 and returned on 12 March 1940.

In September 1939, 352 girls from the Camden School for Girls were evacuated to Uppingham School in Rutland but this did not work out and, in October 1939, the Camden girls were subsequently moved to the market town of Grantham to be educated at Kesteven and Grantham Girls' School. After 5 terms in Grantham, the Camden girls were relocated to Stamford in March 1941. The girls stayed in Stamford for seven additional terms, leaving the school in summer 1943. Stamford girls were unaccustomed to the city dwellers and Camden girls' distinctive green school uniform stood out in the town.

== Merger ==
In recent years, Stamford High School and the boys' Stamford School were united under the leadership of a single principal as the Stamford Endowed Schools, with sixth-form teaching carried out jointly between Stamford School and Stamford High School. Stamford Endowed Schools as an organisation also included Stamford Junior School, a co-educational establishment for pupils aged between 2 and 11 years (the two other school taught pupils aged 11–18).

Stamford Endowed Schools became co-educational from September 2023 and fully co-educational in every year group from 2024. The old Stamford High School site is now used as a bespoke sixth-form campus, named 'St Martin's'.

== Notable former pupils ==
Former pupils of the school include:

- Izzy Bizu, singer-songwriter
- Sarah Cawood
- Lucy Cohu, actress
- Paule Constable, stage lighting designer
- Rae Earl
- Anita Ganeri, children's author
- Daphne Ledward, Gardeners' Question Time panellist
- Claire Lomas
- Sarah Outen, first woman to row solo across the Indian Ocean
