= In a Monastery Garden (disambiguation) =

In a Monastery Garden is a celebrated piece of music by Albert Ketèlbey. It may also refer to

- In a Monastery Garden (film), a 1932 British film directed by Maurice Elvey
- In a Monastery Garden, a BBC Radio 4 gardening programme presented by Nigel Colborn
- "In a Monastery Garden", an episode of the British TV series Rosemary & Thyme
