= John Cushnie =

British landscape designer, author, journalist, and broadcaster

John Alexander Montgomery Cushnie (14 May 1943 – 31 December 2009) was a landscape designer, author, journalist, and broadcaster in the United Kingdom, best known as a regular panellist on the long-running BBC Radio 4 programme Gardeners' Question Time.

== Early life ==
Cushnie was born in Lurgan, County Armagh, Northern Ireland, in May 1943, the son of a factory supervisor. He was educated at Lurgan College, before studying at the Greenmount College of Agriculture and Horticulture.

== Career ==
After graduating from Greenmount College, Cushnie began a ten-year career in the civil service in Belfast, working for the Northern Ireland Housing Executive.

After this, he established a landscape design and contracting company – Cushnie Landscapes. He worked across the United Kingdom, for both the public and private sectors, focussing on creating "traditional" gardens. The firm had up to 12 employees.

His work with Cushnie Landscapes brought him to the attention of BBC Radio Ulster, where he was invited to appear as a gardening expert. Cushnie later became a regular panellist for 15 years on the BBC Radio 4 programme Gardeners' Question Time. Mark Damazer, the station's former controller, said that Cushnie "laced every programme with warmth and joy". He also answered questions for 39 years on BBC Radio Ulster's gardening programmes.

In addition to his radio work and the running of his company he was gardening editor of Ireland's Homes Interior and Living magazine and was a contributor to the Daily Telegraph.

== Personal life ==
He lived in Killyleagh, County Down and studied horticulture at Greenmount College of Agriculture and Horticulture in Antrim. He was married with two sons and a daughter. Although he was brought up as a Presbyterian, after he married he followed his wife's denomination (the Church of Ireland). Cushnie died on 31 December 2009 from a heart attack, aged 66, less than a week after his final appearance on Gardeners' Question Time.

== Bibliography ==
- Ground Cover: a thousand beautiful plants for difficult places (with photographs from The Garden Picture Library, hardcover, 160 pages, Kyle Cathie Limited, 1999, ISBN 1-85626-326-6)
- How to Garden: the only gardening book you will ever need (with photographs by Steven Wooster, hardcover, 192 pages, Angus Books Limited, 2001, ISBN 1-904594-27-1)
- Gardener's Question Time: All Your Gardening Problems Solved (with co-authors Bob Flowerdew, Pippa Greenwood, Bunny Guinness, Anne Swithinbank, illustrations by Bunny Guinness, and photographs from The Garden Picture Gallery and others, paperback, 325 pages, Bookmart Limited, 2005, ISBN 1-84509-189-2)
- How to Prune: techniques and tips for every plant and every season (with photographs by John Swithinbank, hardcover, 256 pages, Kyle Cathie Limited, 2007, ISBN 978-1-85626-738-0)
- Hedge Man: John Cushnie (with illustrations by Chris Gould and foreword by Bunny Guinness, hardcover, 198 pages, Constable and Robinson Limited, 2010, ISBN 978-1-84901-545-5)
- Trees for the Garden paperback 224 pages (Kyle Cathie Press 2002) ISBN 1 85626 551 X
- Shrubs for the Garden hardback 224 pages (Kyle Cathie Press, 2004) ISBN 1 85626 502 1, photographs by Marianne Majerus.
