= Bunny Guinness =

Landscape architect

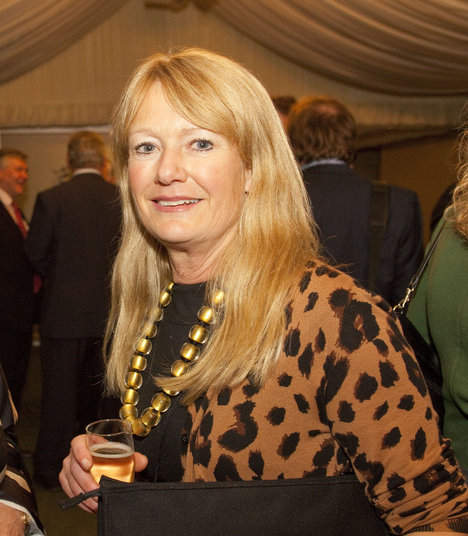
Bunny Guinness, 2011

Peta "Bunny" Guinness (née Ellis; born 16 December 1955) is a British chartered landscape architect, journalist and radio personality who is a regular panellist on the long-running BBC Radio 4 programme, Gardener's Question Time. She also writes a weekly column in the Sunday Telegraph. She presented The Great Garden Challenge on Channel 4 in 2005.

Guinness took a BSc (Hons) in horticulture at Reading University, after which she qualified as a landscape architect at Birmingham Polytechnic (now Birmingham City University). She was awarded an honorary doctorate by the University in 2009.

She exhibits regularly at the Chelsea Flower Show, where she has won six gold medals. Her core business, Bunny Guinness Landscape Design Limited, is based near Peterborough in the East Midlands of England.

Guinness opposes a ban on the use of peat in horticulture, saying the alternatives are less sustainable. Banning peat, she says is virtue signalling.

She was listed in House & Garden magazine in 2021 as one of the top 50 garden designers in the UK.

== Family ==
Her father was Squadron Leader Peter William Ellis, DFC and her mother Barbara Helen Stockitt (née Austin). She married Kevin Michael Rundell Guinness in 1976, a member of the Guinness brewing family. Her mother is sister of rose breeder David C.H. Austin, who named a rose after her. Her daughter, Unity, has a degree in landscape architecture and works with her.

Bunny is a nickname given by her family; as a baby her dark eyes made her resemble a currant bun.

== Bibliography ==
- Gardener's Question Time: All Your Gardening Problems Solved (with co-authors John Cushnie, Bob Flowerdew, Pippa Greenwood, Anne Swithinbank, and photographs from The Garden Picture Gallery and others, paperback, 325 pages, Bookmart Limited, 2005, ISBN 1-84509-189-2)
- Family Gardens: How to Create Magical Spaces for All Ages (paperback, 128 pages, David & Charles, 2008, ISBN 978-0715327951)
