= Matthew Wilson (gardener) =

British garden designer

Matthew Wilson is an English garden designer, writer, radio and television broadcaster and lecturer. He is a regular participant on Gardener's Question Time on BBC Radio 4.

He mainly works as a landscape designer but has written several books, been a correspondent for the Financial Times and is a long serving panellist on BBC Radio 4 Gardeners' Question Time.

Despite his parents owning a cut flower nursery in Kent when he was a child, his career in horticulture only started in his mid-twenties. Wilson spent ten years with the Royal Horticultural Society as Curator of Hyde Hall Garden and Head of Site and Curator of Harlow Carr Garden, subsequently he became RHS Head of Gardens Creative Design. He was Managing Director of Clifton Nurseries from 2011 to 2016. In 2016 he established Matthew Wilson Gardens (MWG), a garden design and horticulture consultancy, working throughout the UK and internationally on projects ranging from courtyard gardens to large estates and corporate landscapes.

At The Royal Horticultural Society, Chelsea Flower Show in 2015 he designed the “Royal Bank of Canada Garden”. The garden focused on living sustainably through good and understanding the importance of conserving fresh water. The garden is divided into three main parts; a zero irrigation ‘dry garden’, central water harvesting/storage zone, and edible garden. He won a Silver Gilt medal at the show.

At the 2016 Chelsea Flower Show his 'Welcome to Yorkshire' garden won the prestigious People's Choice award, voted for by TV viewers and visitors to the show.

His 2022 show garden 'Home' for Shenzhen Flower Show won the prestigious Gold Medal, despite being designed and delivered remotely due to the Covid 19 pandemic.

Other awards include the Futurescape Global award for best residential landscape over $500k, awarded in Riyadh in April 2025, and the best large residential garden at the 2022 SGD Awards.

In March 2026 he was appointed President of the North of England Horticultural Society, the organisation that runs the Harrogate Spring and Autumn Flower Shows. https://www.flowershow.org.uk/about-us

From his mid teens he has been involved in a number of bands as a singer, song writer and guitarist. In 1984 with school friend Simon Chandler as Almost Alone he released a single, Blue City Since 2017 he has fronted the 6-piece indie rock band The Lokeys. They released their debut album At Terminal Velocity in June 2025.

He has been listed annually in House & Garden (magazine) from 2021 - 2025, as one of the top 50 garden designers in the UK.
