= Alan Gemmell (botanist) =

Alan Robertson Gemmell OBE JP FRSE (10 May 1913 – 5 July 1986) was Professor of Biology at Keele University and a regular member of the panel on the BBC Radio Home Service (later BBC Radio 4) programme Gardeners' Question Time from 1950 for some 30 years. Disagreements on the programme between Gemmell and fellow panel member Bill Sowerbutts became legendary.

== Life ==
Gemmell was born in Glasgow, the son of Alexander Nicol Gemmell, a cashier, and his wife Mary Robertson. He was brought up in Troon and educated at Ayr Academy followed by Glasgow University where he gained a first class BSc in Botany and later, on a Commonwealth Scholarship, the University of Minnesota in 1935 where he did agricultural research in plant pathology gaining an MS in 1937. He specialised in the diseases of cereals but his first paper was published on the diseases of golf course greens.

Returning to Glasgow, Gemmell obtained a PhD in 1939 and then carried out agricultural research at the West of Scotland Agricultural College (1937–41). He was a lecturer in Botany at Glasgow (1942–44); a biologist at West Midlands Forensic Science Laboratory (1944–45); lecturer in Botany at Manchester University (1945–50) before joining the then recently established University of Keele, the first new post-war British university which opened in 1950, where he stayed for 27 years as professor and later Emeritus.

He was instrumental in establishing the course in biology at Keele University, which was not then offered in the UK. His career also took him to Tehran, Iran (then Persia) and Africa to establish similar courses.

In 1950 he was elected a Fellow of the Royal Society of Edinburgh. His proposers were Frederick W Sansome, Claude Wardlaw, John Walton and Samuel Williams.

On BBC Desert Island Discs he estimated he had appeared on over 1,200 Gardeners Question Time programmes.

He died in Brodick on the Isle of Arran on 5 July 1986.

== Family ==
In 1942 he married Janet Ada Boyd Duncanson.

== Publications ==
- Gardener's Question Time (1964)
- Developmental Plant Anatomy (1966) Hodder & Stoughton ISBN 978-0-7131-2222-0
- Penguin Book of Basic Gardening (1975) ISBN 978-0-14-046196-1
- Sunday Gardener Fontana (1973) ISBN 978-0-00-613620-0
- Practical Gardener's Encyclopaedia (1977) Collins, ISBN 978-0-00-435007-3
