= Ian Gillies =

British quiz player (1927–2002)

Ian Malcolm Gillies (7 December 1927 – 13 April 2002), known to many simply as Mycroft from BBC Radio 4's Brain of Britain, was a quiz player and question setter in the United Kingdom. His character name was taken from Arthur Conan Doyle's Mycroft Holmes, the smarter older brother of Sherlock Holmes.

He won the Brain of Britain final in 1964 and later the three-year competition Brain of Brains and the nine-year-final Top Brain.

Educated at the Royal Grammar School Worcester and Jesus College, Oxford, he joined the Royal Air Force before retiring on medical grounds.

He turned question author for the show that he previously won, Brain of Britain. He chaired a single edition of that show in 1972 after the original host, Franklin Engelmann, died mid-series.
