= Paul Gambaccini =

American radio and television presenter

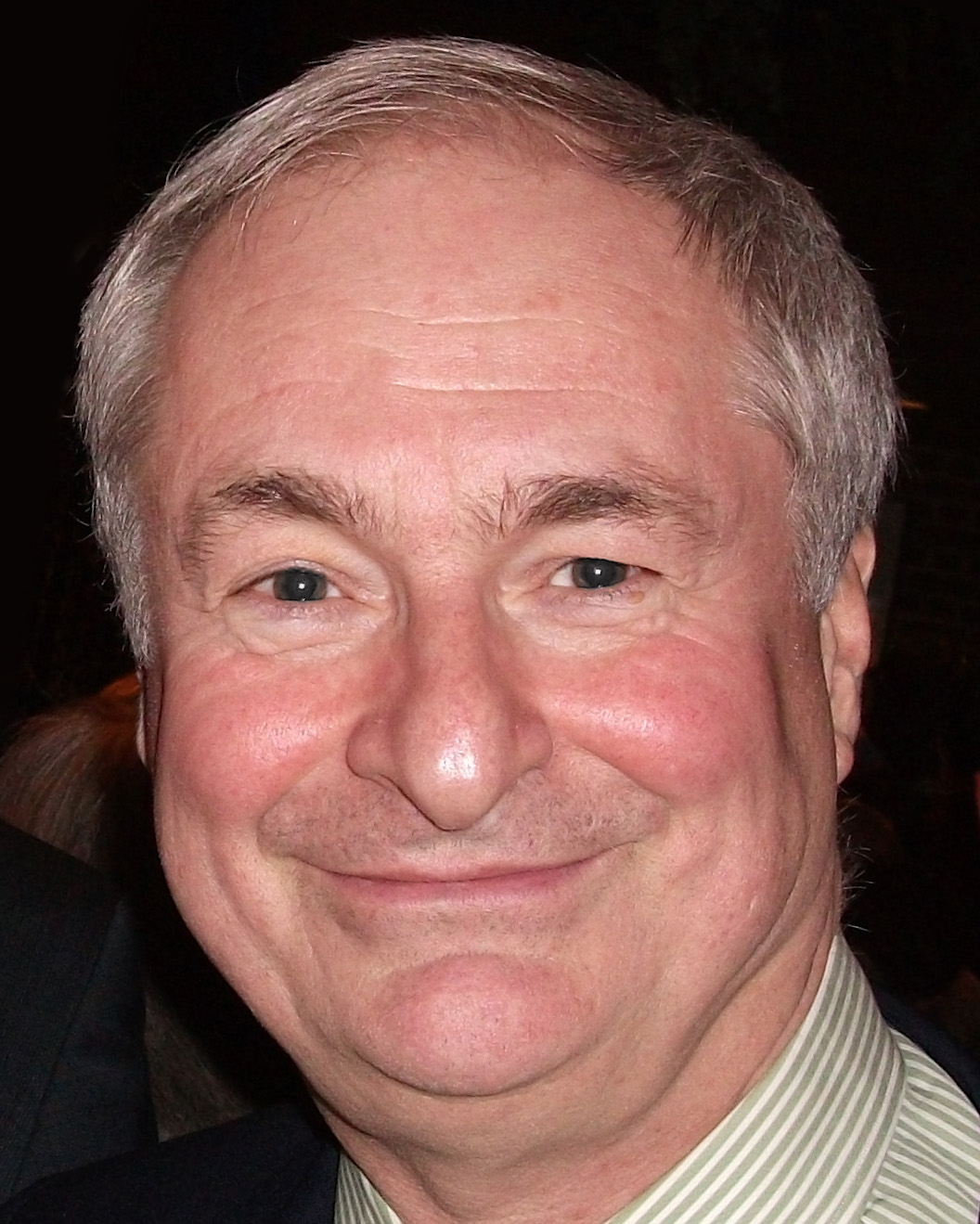
- Gambaccini in 2010
- Born: Paul Matthew Gambaccini; 2 April 1949 (age 77); New York City, U.S.
- Other names: The Great Gambo; The Professor of Pop
- Occupations: Broadcaster, author
- Years active: 1967–present
- Spouse: Christopher Sherwood (m. 2012)
- Awards: Radio Academy Hall of Fame, 2005

Paul Matthew Gambaccini (born 2 April 1949) is an American–British radio and television presenter and author. He is a dual citizen of the United States and United Kingdom, having become a British citizen in 2005.

Known as "The Great Gambo" and "The Professor of Pop", Gambaccini was a BBC Radio 1 presenter for 16 years, including 11 years on a weekly show counting down the Billboard Top 30 songs. A regular contributor to BBC Radio 4's long-running arts programme Kaleidoscope, Gambaccini was a long-time TV morning show correspondent for British television, and makes regular appearances on other British TV magazine shows.

Gambaccini was the host of the 12-part Classic FM series Paul Gambaccini's Hall of Heroes, and chairs the Radio 4 music quiz Counterpoint. He was presenter of Pick of the Pops on BBC Radio 2 from 9 July 2016, to 7 October 2023 and America's Greatest Hits on Greatest Hits Radio on Saturday afternoons from February 2020 until February 2026. He now presents the Paul Gambaccini Collection on Radio 2 which began on 29 October 2023. He was inducted into the Radio Academy Hall of Fame in 2005. Gambaccini is the author of more than 15 books.

== Education ==
Born in the Bronx, New York City, Gambaccini studied at Dartmouth College, where he obtained a degree in history in 1970.

Gambaccini then migrated to the United Kingdom and attended University College, Oxford, where he studied philosophy, politics and economics. He has since returned to Oxford, where he delivered a series of lectures in January and February 2009, as the News International Visiting Professor of Broadcast Media. In February 2010 he was invited by the vice-chancellor of the University of Oxford, Andrew Hamilton, to deliver the inaugural LGBT lecture Out on Monday to the university's LGBT staff, students and faculty.

== Broadcasting career ==
Gambaccini's broadcasting career began at Dartmouth College, where he was manager of the now-defunct WDCR, a college-owned-and-operated Top 40 radio station. Having left Oxford, Gambaccini considered further study in law at Harvard or Yale, but had the opportunity of writing for Rolling Stone magazine, as British correspondent. He attributes his broadcasting career to this post—especially an interview in 1973 with Elton John which brought him to the attention of BBC Radio producer John Walters who arranged for him to host on BBC Radio 1. Gambaccini then started broadcasting in the UK, on BBC Radio 1, from September 1974, first as a music reporter on the John Peel Saturday show Rockspeak and as presenter of All American Heroes. The following year, he started a show focussing on the weeks' music in the US chart which was to continue for over a decade. The show was broadcast every Saturday afternoon until his last show on 8 February 1986. Thereafter, he moved to independent radio to host American Countdown. In 1990, he returned to Radio 1, but left during the tenure of controller Matthew Bannister in 1993.

In 1992 Gambaccini became a founding personality on the UK's classical music station Classic FM, where he hosted the weekly Classical CD Chart show. He left for BBC Radio 3 in 1995, where he broadcast an hour-long morning show, in a slot formerly used for Composer of the Week. He returned to Classic FM in 1997.

Alongside his work in music radio, he contributed regularly to BBC Radio 4's long-running arts programme Kaleidoscope between 1975 and 1998.

For 13 years Gambaccini reviewed films for breakfast television, first on TV-am and then GMTV. In the early 1980s he presented The Other Side of the Tracks on Channel 4, which ran for three series. His other television appearances include Pebble Mill at One, Call My Bluff, Music for the Millennium, and The South Bank Show. He co-hosted coverage of Live Aid in 1985, which he later said was one of the two proudest achievements of his career.

In 1998, he joined BBC Radio 2. His first show was on 18 April 1998, once again opening the first of his weekly shows America's Greatest Hits with "Born to Run" by Bruce Springsteen. In 2002, he quit his role at Classic FM, to present a weekly chart show on London's Jazz FM until 2004. He was also a contributor to the London station LBC when it was taken over by Chrysalis.

He has worked widely across the BBC and the British Forces Broadcasting Service (BFBS) as well as contributing to many television shows, mostly related to music, film, and the arts. He narrated the BBC Radio adaptation of Espedair Street, the Iain Banks novel.

Gambaccini has presented the annual Ivor Novello Awards since 1990, the Parliamentary Jazz Awards since 2005, the Music Industry Trust's Man of the Year Dinner since 1999, and the Radio Academy Awards for a ten-year stretch from 1998 to 2008.

In August 2008, Gambaccini returned to Classic FM, to present a 12-part series Paul Gambaccini's Hall of Heroes on Sunday evenings between 9:00 and 10:00. In March 2008, he took over as chairman of the Radio 4 music quiz Counterpoint from Edward Seckerson; he was temporarily replaced in 2013 by Russell Davies and returned to the show in November 2014 after being cleared of allegations of historical sexual offences made against him. He returned to BBC Radio 2 with America's Greatest Hits on 15 November 2014, and hosted it until 2 July 2016, when he took over Pick of the Pops from Tony Blackburn, the following week.

Gambaccini started his final America's Greatest Hits on the BBC with "Born to Run" by Bruce Springsteen & the E Street Band, and ended it with Justin Timberlake's "Can't Stop The Feeling!". Trevor Nelson took over the Saturday timeslot with his Rhythm Nation programme, that was allocated to Gambaccini's America's Greatest Hits programme for seven years. The show was revived on Greatest Hits Radio from February 2020 until February 2026 airing 5–7pm on Saturdays, with the first show starting off with "Born to Run", just like the final BBC Radio episode, and ending with "Uptight (Everything's Alright)" by Stevie Wonder. Gambaccini has also presented special shows on Greatest Hits Radio on bank holidays and over the Christmas holidays. On Boxing Day 2021, he co-presented a special show on Greatest Hits Radio paying tribute to Janice Long, whom he had discovered in 1982.

On 10 August 2023, it was announced that Gambaccini would leave Pick of the Pops on 7 October 2023, after seven and a half years at the helm, to host a new live Sunday evening show for Radio 2, titled The Paul Gambaccini Collection, which would begin on 29 October. He announced the news on the show on 12 August, and he was replaced by Steve Wright.

On 22 October 2023, Gambaccini was interviewed by Wright in a special programme on Radio 2 to celebrate his 50 years of broadcasting on UK radio.

== Books ==
Gambaccini was co-author of The Guinness Book of British Hit Singles and related titles, with Tim and Jo Rice, alongside Radio 1 colleague at that time, Mike Read, between 1977 and 1996. Gambaccini's own books include Love Letters, Radio Boy, Top 100 Albums and Track Records. The Ultimate Man, a musical about a comic book superhero, was co-written with Alastair King and Jane Edith Wilson, and produced at the Bridewell Theatre in London in 2000.

== Comic book fandom ==
Gambaccini was active in the realm of comic book fandom. As an American teenager in the 1960s his missives were regularly published in the letter columns of titles such as Justice League of America and The Amazing Spider-Man. Gambaccini claims to have invented the term "Brand Echh", which later became widely used by Stan Lee.

While still in high school, Gambaccini began contributing to comics fanzines, including the publication Rocket's Blast Comicollector. In 1964 he succeeded Jerry Bails (the so-called "father of comic book fandom") as executive secretary of the Academy of Comic-Book Fans and Collectors, an umbrella organization for the burgeoning world of comics fandom During 1964–65, he also published eight issues of Forum which was an Academy newsletter for ex-board members. As part of his involvement with the academy, Gambaccini helped organize the comics industry's first awards, the Alley Awards.

Gambaccini and television presenter Jonathan Ross co-owned Top 10 Comics, a comic shop in London which opened in 1989 and closed in 1995. Gambaccini has been an official guest at many British comic conventions, including the United Kingdom Comic Art Convention (where he co-presented the 1990 Eagle Awards and the 1997 National Comics Awards), and Comics Festival UK.

A character introduced in The Flash No. 141 named Paul Gambi, a tailor specializing in super-villain outfits, is an homage to Paul Gambaccini, who had written a letter to the Flash editor, later published in the letter column, asking the question, "Where do all these super-villains get their costumes?".

== Charity work ==
Gambaccini has been a supporter of gay-related charities. In 1995, he was named Philanthropist of the Year by the National Charity Fundraisers for his work on behalf of the Terrence Higgins Trust. He is a patron of the London Gay Symphony Orchestra. In 2010, he won an episode of celebrity Mastermind, with his chosen beneficiary charity being Stonewall.

== Personal life ==
Gambaccini lives in the Kennington area of south London.

Gambaccini has been openly gay for many years, saying in 2013: "I was never 'in'." In June 2012, he entered into a civil partnership with Christopher Sherwood. One week later, they married in the New York Botanical Garden. In 2013, Gambaccini said he had been highlighted as a potential security risk by the BBC earlier in his career due to his sexuality, with a symbol resembling a Christmas tree on the cover of his personnel file: "It meant you were 'as camp as Christmas' and thus a potential security risk." In fact, the symbol was a general indication that the subject should not be promoted or transferred without reference to the department responsible for security vetting, due to left-leaning sympathies (see: "Christmas tree" files).

In October 2012, Gambaccini made headlines when he said he had known rumours about his BBC colleague Jimmy Savile going back to the 1980s. He said: "The expression I came to associate with Savile's sexual partners was either one used by production assistants or one I made up to summarise their reports ...'under-age subnormals'. He targeted the institutionalised, the hospitalised – and this was known. Why did Jimmy go to hospitals? That's where the patients were."

On 1 November 2013, it was reported that Gambaccini had been arrested on suspicion of historical sexual offences as part of an investigation by Operation Yewtree in the United Kingdom, which had been set up following the Jimmy Savile sexual abuse scandal the previous year. He was released on bail and his spokesman said that he denied the allegations. It was announced on 10 October 2014 that no charges would be brought. Giving evidence to the House of Commons Home Affairs Select Committee on 3 March 2015, Gambaccini said he believed he was used as "human fly paper" to encourage other people to come forward and make allegations against him.

The BBC reported that Gambaccini also said he suspected his bail was repeatedly extended until the end of high-profile cases involving other celebrities because "police did not want juries to hear a former Radio 1 DJ had been cleared of sexual wrongdoing". He also argued in favour of a 28-day bail limit; Home Secretary Theresa May had announced in December 2014 that she was consulting on such a limit in all but exceptional cases. Gambaccini's allegations of a "witch-hunt" were denied by the Director of Public Prosecutions. The 28-day limit came into effect in April 2017.

Gambaccini wrote an account of his experience in his book Love, Paul Gambaccini: My Year Under the Yewtree, which was published in 2015. In February 2016, Irish Supreme Court Judge Adrian Hardiman used a review of the book to criticise what he described as the radical undermining of the presumption of innocence, especially in sex cases, including Gambaccini's, by the methods used in Operation Yewtree (among other instances).

In February 2017, Gambaccini sued the Metropolitan Police, citing a loss of £200,000 during his time under investigation. In November 2018, he settled a claim against the Crown Prosecution Service, who agreed to pay him damages; the amount was not disclosed due to confidentiality clauses in the settlement agreement.

In 2026, Gambaccini revealed that he was diagnosed with Alzheimer's disease in early 2025.

== Awards ==
- 1995 – Philanthropist of the Year by the National Charity Fundraisers
- 1996 – Outstanding Contribution to Music Radio Award from the Radio Academy
- 2003 – Sony Radio Academy Award for Music Broadcaster of the Year
- 2005 – Sony Radio Academy Silver Award for a Weekly Music Programme
- 2005 – Inducted into the Radio Academy Hall of Fame

== Bibliography ==
- A Conversation With Elton John and Bernie Taupin – Putnam Publishing Group 1975
- Paul McCartney in his own words – Omnibus Press 1976
- The Guinness Book of British Hit Singles with Tim Rice, Jo Rice and Mike Read – Guinness, first published 1977: several subsequent editions
- Critic's Choice: Top 200 Albums – Omnibus Press 1978 (US title: Rock Critics' Choice: The Top 200 Albums)
- Masters of Rock – Omnibus Press 1982
- Track Records – Elm Tree Books 1985
- Radio Boy: An Adolescent DJ's Story – Elm Tree Books 1986
- Paul Gambaccini Presents the Top 100 Albums – GRR/Pavilion Books 1987 (US title: Critics' Choice: The Top 100 Rock 'n' Roll Albums of All Time)
- United Kingdom Top 1000 Singles (with Tim Rice and Jo Rice) – Gullane Children's Books 1988
- The Guinness Book of British Hit Albums (with Tim Rice and Jo Rice) – Guinness First published 1983: several subsequent editions
- Hits of The 80s (with Jo Rice, Tim Rice and Tony Brown) – Guinness 1990
- Top 40 Charts (with Tim Rice and Jo Rice) – Guinness 1992
- Television's Greatest Hits (with Rod Taylor) – Network Books 1993
- Love Letters – Michael O'Mara Books 1996
- The McCartney Interviews: After the Break-up – Omnibus Press 1996
- Close Encounters – Omnibus Press 1998
- The Complete Eurovision Song Contest Companion (with Tim and Jo Rice and Tony Brown) – Pavilion Books 1998
- The Eurovision Companion (revised edition), Pavilion Books 1999
- Complete Book of the British Charts (with Jon Kutner, Neil Warwick & Tony Brown) Omnibus Press 2000.
- Love, Paul Gambaccini: My Year Under the Yewtree - Biteback Publishing 2015. Memoir.
