= Anne Swithinbank =

British gardener

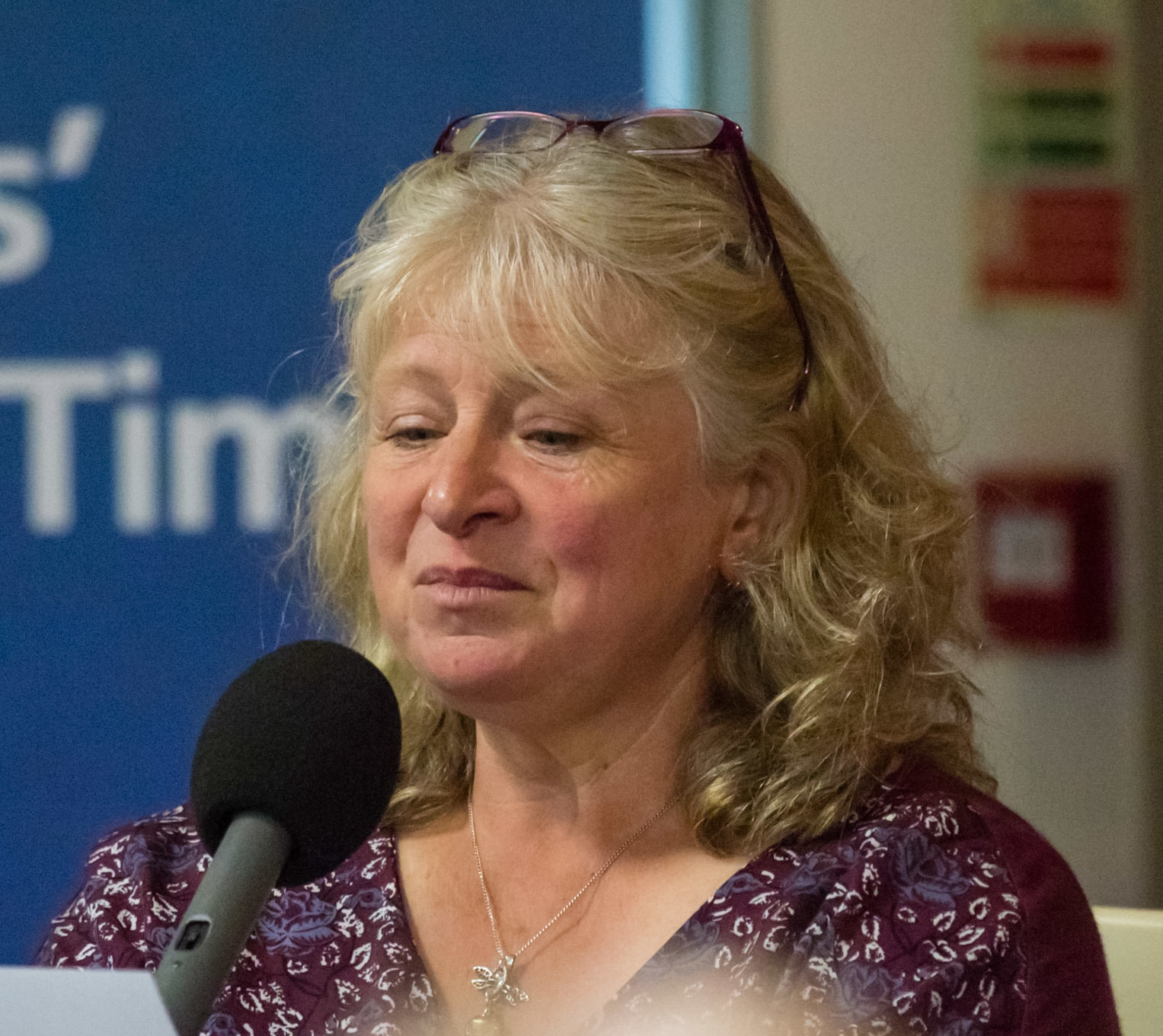
Anne Swithinbank in 2016

Anne Swithinbank (born 1957 in Belvedere in Kent) is a trained horticulturist and freelance gardening broadcaster who has written several books on gardening, including Gardener's Question Time: All Your Gardening Problems Solved, Gardeners' World Book of Houseplants and Gardeners' World Book of Containers.

== Biography ==
She trained at the Royal Botanical Gardens, Kew Gardens and was Glasshouse Supervisor at the Royal Horticultural Society's garden at Wisley, Surrey.

She is known for being a regular panellist on Gardeners' Question Time since 1994, she has also presented television gardening programmes including The Gardens of the Caribbean and The Chelsea Flower Show.

She writes for several magazines and papers including the News of the World and BBC's Gardeners' World Magazine. She has written several books on gardening including the Gardeners' World Book of Houseplants and Gardeners' World Book of Containers.

In 1986, she left Wisley to work as a freelance gardener and speaker. She then joined the team on BBC 2's Gardeners' World where she was a regular presenter for five years; subsequently, she has made guest appearances.

Swithinbank is a patron of the charity the British Cactus & Succulent Society.

== Bibliography ==
- Gardener's Question Time: All Your Gardening Problems Solved (with co-authors John Cushnie, Bob Flowerdew, Pippa Greenwood, Bunny Guinness, illustrations by Bunny Guinness, and photographs from The Garden Picture Gallery and others, paperback, 325 pages, Bookmart Limited, 2005, ISBN 1-84509-189-2)
- Gardeners' World Book of Houseplants
- Gardeners' World Book of Containers
