= Shirley Hibberd =

British writer (1825–1890)

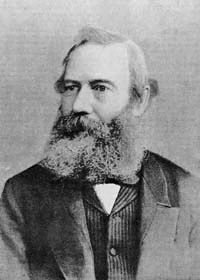
- Born: 1825
- Died: 1890 (aged 64–65)
- Spouses: Sarah Voyer (m. 1850; died 1880) Ellen Mantle (m. 1884; died 1885)
- Children: Ellen Shirley Hibberd (1885–1975)
- Writing career
- Years active: 1849–1890
- Subjects: Gardening and horticulture

James Shirley Hibberd (1825 – 16 November 1890) was one of the most popular and successful gardening writers of the Victorian era. He was a best-selling editor of three gardening magazines, including Amateur Gardening, the only 19th-century gardening magazine still being published today. He wrote over a dozen books on gardening and several more on natural history and related subjects. He promoted town gardening, aquariums, bee-keeping, vegetarianism, water recycling, environmental conservation and the prevention of cruelty to animals and birds, all before they were taken up as 'causes' in the twentieth century. Most important of all, he taught and promoted amateur gardening, before it was acceptable among the gardening establishment, and helped to found the whole consumer industry in amateur gardening that we have today.

== Early life ==
Shirley Hibberd was born in Mile End Old Town, now part of Stepney, in east London, England. His parentage is obscure but it is believed that his father died when he was about 14 and he then started work as a bookbinder or bookseller. His earliest known writing dates to about 1849, when he was active in the Vegetarian Society and edited their magazine, the Vegetarian Advocate. During that time he was described as an 'operative chemist', which meant an experimental scientist. As well as editing the magazine he lectured on vegetarianism throughout east London. By 1851, however, he seems to have lost interest in vegetarianism, and then began to lecture more widely on science, natural history and other subjects. He even gave a series of talks on the Crimean War at Wyld's Great Globe in Leicester Square. As a journalist, Hibberd worked on a succession of popular family magazines and was a frequent contributor to Notes and Queries.

After his marriage in 1850 to Sarah Voyer, Hibberd moved into a small house in Pentonville, north London, and began to take an interest in gardening, which seems to have been a natural progression from his childhood interest in wild flowers, birds and insects. He soon discovered the difficulties of gardening in inner city London where the atmosphere was laden with soot, and fog and smog was prevalent throughout the winter. The other problem was that there was very little information available for amateur gardeners, especially those living in towns and cities. The professional gardeners, who dominated the gardening press, refused to believe that city gardening was either possible or desirable. This was Hibberd's opportunity to make a name for himself, and he began to teach himself gardening, discovering what plants could survive in London and how amateurs could learn things for themselves.

== Publications ==
Hibberd's first gardening book was The Town Garden (1855), which described his own garden in Pentonville and advised novices how to start gardening. The same year he had already published Brambles and Bay Leaves, a book of essays on science and natural history, largely based on articles he had previously written for magazines or on lectures he had given. These were followed by three books on aquariums, another enduring interest for early scientists, who were fascinated with the complexities of preserving living things in water and how oxygen was used. By 1856 Hibberd had moved to Tottenham, further north in London, and there began to keep a variety of aquatic creatures, birds and bees. These experiences led to his best known book, Rustic Adornments for Homes of Taste. The book was so successful that a second edition followed in 1857, and in 1858 his publishers, Groombridges, invited him to start a monthly magazine for amateur gardeners, The Floral World and Garden Guide. With the Floral World, Hibberd proved himself to be one of the first successful writers for amateur gardeners. He encouraged correspondence and discussion, answered queries and encouraged local amateurs to write for him. He began to publish a series of books on every aspect of gardening and reported on his own experiments in trying out different varieties of plants. He became particularly interested in the problem of potato blight which had caused the Irish famine, developing his own method of growing potatoes on tiles to combat the disease.

By 1858 Hibberd had moved to Lordship Terrace, Stoke Newington in north-east London, and maintained his garden there for about thirteen years, writing about it in all his books and providing illustrations of the garden for his readers. In 1862 he took over The Gardener's Weekly Magazine, an ailing publication, which he re-launched in 1865 as The Gardener's Magazine. This became a serious rival to the well-established Gardeners' Chronicle and Cottage Gardener and put him in the forefront of horticultural publishing. From 1863 onwards he produced titles on every aspect of gardening, including Profitable Gardening, The Rose Book, The Fern Garden, The Amateur's Flower Garden, The Amateur's Greenhouse and Conservatory and The Amateur's Kitchen Garden. He produced two series of books with coloured plates, New and Rare Beautiful-Leaved Plants and Familiar Garden Flowers, a book about wild flowers, Field Flowers and was the first person to make a study of ivy with his monograph, The Ivy. In 1884 he started another magazine, Amateur Gardening, which still survives today.

== Environmental work ==
Shirley Hibberd always believed that man should live in harmony with the natural world. As an observational bee-keeper he realised the importance of bees in pollinating plants and tried out many of the new types of hive which were designed to prolong the lives of bees, avoid swarming and increase the yield of honey. He exhibited his 'town honey' at horticultural shows and promoted the idea of keeping bees on balconies and even inside people's houses, where they could come and go through windows. He was adamant that cruelty to animals should cease, protected garden birds and caged birds, and developed a method of growing watercress in troughs, to avoid diseases from plants grown in polluted water. This was explained in his book Home Culture of the Watercress for which he was awarded a gold medal by the Royal Horticultural Society. He also designed a system of water tanks for collection of rainwater for use in houses, published in a pamphlet Water for Nothing – Every House its own Water Supply in 1879. He denigrated the 'spoliation' of wild flowers and in particular native ferns, which had become a collecting obsession, known as pteridomania in the 1860s and 70s. In his books he gave detailed instructions for growing plants in glass cases, known as a Wardian case, inside houses. He looked at the science behind the way the plants grew and promoted the idea of growing wild flowers in the cases, rather than the usual ferns and foliage plants.

== Personal life ==
Shirley Hibberd's first marriage to Sarah Elizabeth Voyer (1823–1880) was childless, and she spent much of her life as an invalid. He refers in his writing to a 'tragedy' that befell them in the early part of their marriage, possibly relating to a lost pregnancy, which might also have been connected with a heart defect suffered by his wife, who died of heart disease at the age of 56. He wrote a moving account of their life after 1870, when they took on a new garden, fraught with difficulty, which he believed contributed to her death. Four years later, however, he married his cook, Ellen Mantle, who was 28, while he was 59. They moved to a large house in Kew, south-west London, where Ellen gave birth to a daughter, but she died a few days after giving birth. The daughter, also called Ellen, survived. Hibberd himself died five years later at the age of 65, and his daughter was adopted by his nephew, Charles Montague Mitchell. She subsequently trained as a nurse at the Royal London Hospital, Whitechapel, in east London. Hibberd died at 1 Priory Road, Kew, on 16 November 1890 and was buried six days later in Abney Park Cemetery, Stoke Newington.

== Conflicts ==
Shirley Hibberd never flinched from argument if he felt justified in his own position. During the 1860s he used the pages of the Gardener's Magazine to criticise the workings of the Royal Horticultural Society because he believed it was badly run and was not giving a fair chance to working class amateur gardeners. Later, however, when the society had been reformed, he worked closely with them, and the main reason he moved to Kew was to help re-organise the neglected RHS garden at Chiswick. During the 1870s and 80s he had a series of arguments with the gardener and writer William Robinson. Hibberd had helped Robinson in the 1860s by publishing articles by him in the Floral World and giving good reviews of Robinson's early books. However, in 1871 Robinson started his own gardening magazine, The Garden, closely followed by Gardening Illustrated and set himself up as a rival to Hibberd. This in itself did not worry Hibberd, but Robinson was a well known plagiarist and also frequently picked quarrels with other writers to gain publicity. Resentment surfaced after Robinson had copied an article on vegetables that first appeared in Hibberd's magazine and then criticised Hibberd's book, The Ivy. Hibberd then reported on an asparagus competition organised by Robinson that was a failure. In a series of articles in 1881 the two men hurled abuse at each other which Robinson chose to take as racist remarks (he was Irish). Hibberd ended the quarrel with a quotation from Shakespeare's King John implying that Robinson was of so little account that a drop of water would drown him.

== Legacy ==
Shirley Hibberd is rarely given the credit he deserves as a pioneer in amateur gardening. Other well-known Victorian gardeners, such as Gertrude Jekyll and William Robinson, have gardens still remaining that have been restored. Hibberd's gardens, being town gardens in inner London, have all disappeared through being built over. The only garden connected with him that does remain is Islington Green, a small park he laid out in 1865. Unlike the books of Jekyll and Robinson, Hibberd's books are all out of print, although two were re-issued as facsimiles in the 1980s. It is sometimes thought that he promoted what is considered as typical Victorian formal gardening, based on half-hardy 'bedding plants' and that his books are therefore old-fashioned and irrelevant today. In fact, nothing could be further from the truth. Hibberd constantly condemned the use of bedding plants by amateurs as he felt they were unsuitable for small gardens whose owners would not have the facilities for growing them in glasshouses or the finances to buy them in sufficient quantities, and nor would they be able to maintain such displays adequately. He stated that the most important part of a flower garden was the display of herbaceous perennial plants and shrubs. He also taught amateurs all the skills of growing fruit and vegetables, secrets so closely guarded by professionals that they refused to write about them for general readers. Hibberd's true legacy is his promotion of amateur gardening as a self-contained market where plants, equipment, tools, books, magazines and every other consumer product connected with gardening were made cheaply available to anyone who wanted to use them, and the practice and love of gardening effectively brought together people of different classes as equals.

== Selected publications ==
- Familiar Garden Flowers (1879)

== Bibliography ==
- Betty Massingham (1982), pub.: Faber & Faber. A Century of Gardeners. ISBN 0-571-11811-9
- Anne Wilkinson (2012), pub.: Cortex Design. Shirley Hibberd, The Father of Amateur Gardening: His Life and Works 1825–1890. ISBN 978-0-956-809605
