= Sarah Outen =

British athlete and adventurer (born 1985)

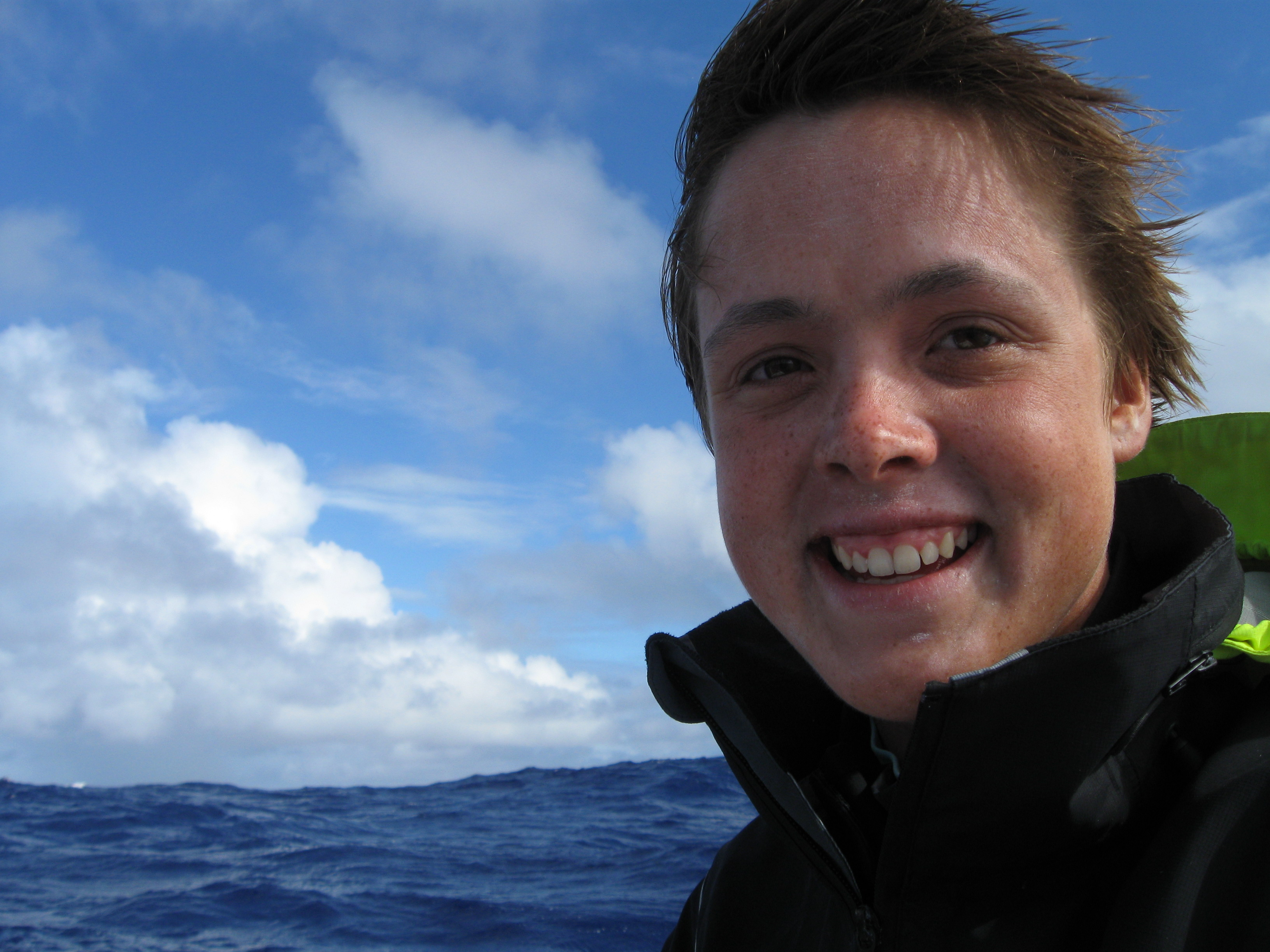
- Self portrait taken on the Indian Ocean voyage, 2009

Personal information
- Nationality: British
- Born: 26 May 1985 (age 41) England, United Kingdom

Sport
- Sport: Rowing, Cycling, Kayaking
- College team: Stamford High School, St Hugh's College, Oxford

Sarah Outen's voice
recorded December 2012

Sarah Dilys Outen MBE FRGS (born 26 May 1985) is a British athlete and adventurer. She is also a motivational speaker in the UK and internationally. Outen was the first woman and the youngest person to row solo across the Indian Ocean and also the Pacific Ocean from Japan to Alaska. She completed a round-the-world journey, mostly under her own power, by rowing boat, bicycle and kayak, on 3 November 2015.

== Education ==
Outen attended Stamford High School before reading Biology at St Hugh's College, Oxford where she started rowing in 2004.

== Projects ==
=== Rowing solo across the Indian Ocean ===
After an eleven-day failed attempt which she dubbed her 'Warm Up Lap', Outen set out again from Fremantle, Western Australia, on 1 April 2009 in her 19ft boat called Serendipity. She rowed for 124 days, 14 hours and 9 minutes before arriving at Bois des Amourettes, on the island of Mauritius, on 3 August 2009. She was the first woman to attempt the crossing single-handedly, and only the fourth person to ever complete a solo crossing. She was also the youngest person and the first woman to row alone across the Indian Ocean.

Her journey raised more than £30,000 for two charities, Arthritis Care and Arthritis Research Campaign. She dedicated the crossing to the memory of her father who died in 2006. She was elected Fellow of the Royal Geographical Society shortly afterwards and awarded three Guinness World Records for her crossing.

=== London2London: Via the World ===
On 1 April 2011, Outen set off on an expedition called "London2London: Via the World". This mostly solo loop of the planet included the first attempt by a woman to row across the north Pacific Ocean. She rowed, cycled and kayaked her way eastward from London around the world, sharing stories about the adventure and experience. The 20,000 miles (32,000 km) journey was scheduled to take 2.5 years to complete. During her expedition, she cycled across Europe and Asia, rowed across the north Pacific, and cycled across parts of the United States and Canada to Cape Cod, before rowing across the North Atlantic to the UK.

In the spring of 2012, during her first attempt on the Pacific leg, her vessel Gulliver was damaged in a storm and she had to be rescued. After several months spent recovering, she restarted her journey in Japan aboard a new seven-metre vessel named Happy Socks. As of 19 June 2013, she had achieved 1097 nautical miles on her row across the Pacific. She communicated about her trip using a satellite phone, filing periodic "phonecasts" from her boat.

On 23 September 2013, after 150 days and 3,750 miles at sea, Outen became the first woman to row solo from Japan to Alaska as well as the first woman to complete a mid-Pacific row from West to East. She arrived at Adak Island in the Aleutian Islands, rowing to within half a mile of a rocky coastline before being towed through the channel between Adak and Kagalaska Island. She was originally bound for Canada, but punishing currents and inclement weather forced her to change destinations for Alaska.

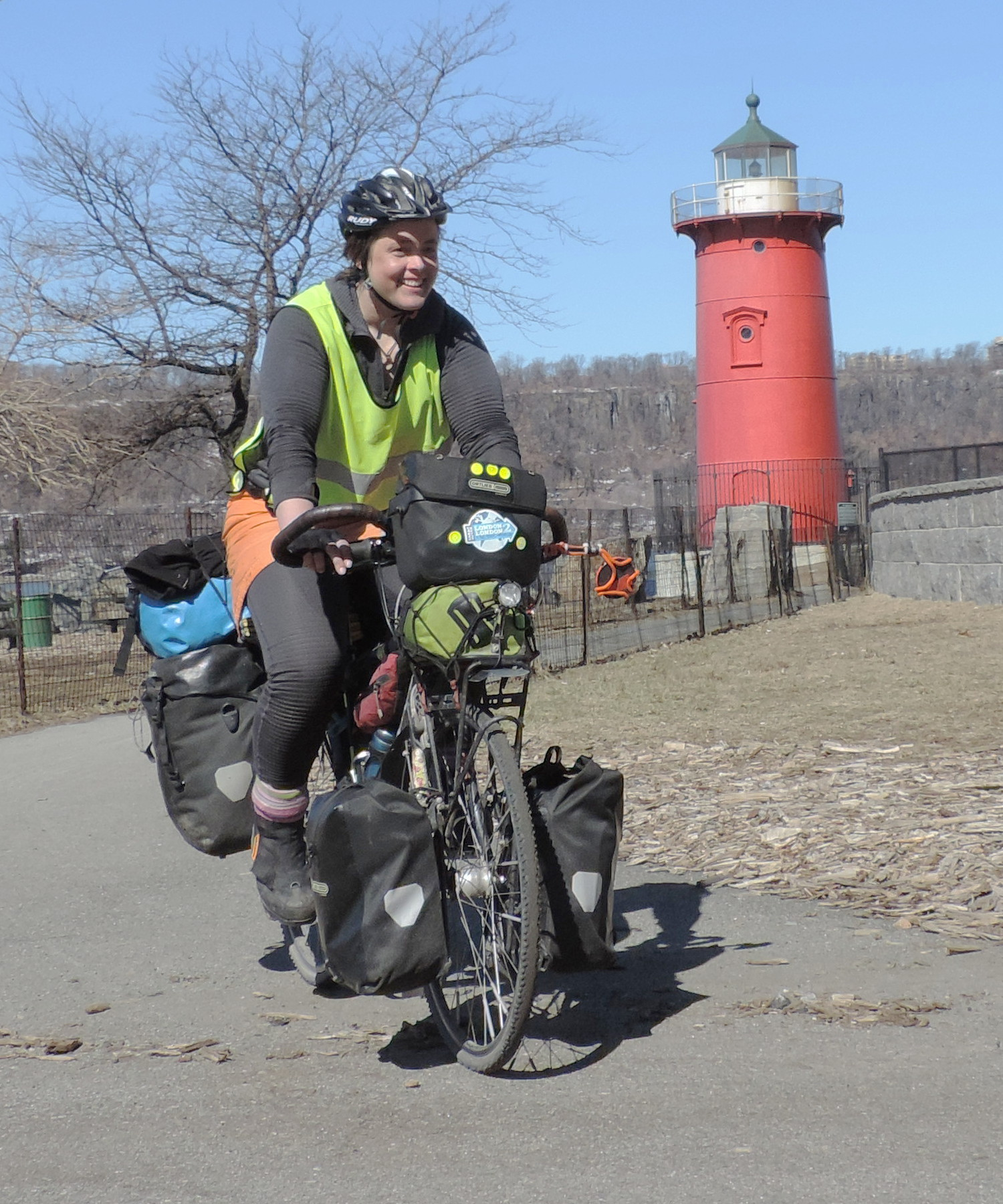
Arriving in New York

In May 2014 she returned to Adak and kayaked 2500 km along the Aleutian island chain and Alaskan Peninsula with Justine Curgenven, to the nearest road in Homer. There is no documentation of anyone else completing this journey in modern times, which involved many long crossings in uncharted waters with strong currents of unknown strength and direction. It took 101 days. From Homer, she got back on her bike and cycled through the Winter to the East coast of America.

In September 2014 she crossed the border into Canada, arrived in New York on 12 March 2015, and left Cape Cod on 14 May. On 5 July she reported that a wave had torn off the rudder of her rowboat. On 6 October, having been at sea for 143 days but beset by Hurricane Joaquin, she abandoned the Atlantic crossing.

She completed the journey at Tower Bridge in London on 3 November 2015.

== Honours ==
She was elected a Fellow of the Royal Geographical Society following her successful Indian Ocean crossing in 2009. Outen was appointed Member of the Order of the British Empire (MBE) in the 2011 Birthday Honours for services to rowing, conservation and charity.

In 2016 the University of Leicester awarded her an honorary Doctor of Laws.

== Publishing ==
Her first book A Dip in the Ocean: Rowing Solo Across The Indian Ocean was published by Summersdale on 7 February 2011.

Her second book Dare to Do: Taking on the planet by bike and boat, which follows her London2London expedition, was published by Nicholas Brealey Publishing on 1 November 2016.

== Personal life ==
During her crossing of the North Pacific Ocean Outen proposed to her long term girlfriend Lucy. Outen was later joined by Lucy for part of the cycle across North America. Outen and her partner live in Oxfordshire.
