= Antony Carr (historian) =

Welsh historian and academic (1938-2019)

Antony David Carr FSA, FRHistS
- Born: 6 February 1938; Dover, Kent, England
- Died: 30 April 2019 (aged 81); Bangor, Gwynedd, Wales
- Occupations: Archivist, historian and academic
- Title: Professor of Medieval Welsh History

Academic background
- Education: BA, MA, PhD.
- Alma mater: Bangor University

Antony David Carr (6 February 1938 – 30 April 2019), sometimes known as Tony Carr, was a Welsh historian. He specialized in the history of Wales in the Middle Ages.

His father was a customs officer who undertook overseas assignments. Carr spent his early years in the Falkland Islands, and later in Mauritius. He then grew up in Menai Bridge, Wales. He attended Beaumaris Grammar School and North Wales University College, now known as Bangor University. He graduated with a BA History degree in 1959. In 1963 he obtained his MA degree, studying the nobles of Edeirnion between 1282 and 1485. He was awarded a PhD in 1976 for his research on the Mostyn family and their estates in North Wales between 1200 and 1642.

When he was 18, Carr won the BBC radio quiz show Brain of Britain in 1956, becoming the youngest ever winner of this competition to date. At the age of 24, he went on to win the inaugural title of Brain of Brains, a competition between the winners of the contest over the previous three years. When that format was expanded to cover nine years, Carr again won the inaugural Top Brain in 1962. He was working for the Essex County Records Office at the time, which was run by the noted archivist F. G. Emmison.

In 1964 he joined the staff of the Department of History and Welsh History at University College of North Wales. He later became a senior lecturer in Welsh History and then Professor of Medieval Welsh History. He retired in 2002 and became Emeritus Professor at the School of History and Archaeology, Bangor University.

== Personal life ==
Antony Carr was married to the folklore historian Glenda Carr and they had two children, Richard and Gwenllïan. Following his funeral there was a memorial service for him in Bangor Cathedral on 11 May 2019.

== Bibliography ==
He wrote articles on the history of Wales in the Middle Ages in history journals, as well as entries to the Oxford Dictionary of National Biography. He was the author of:

- Llywelyn ap Gruffydd (in Welsh). Cardiff: Gwasg Prifysgol Cymru. 1982. ISBN 978-0-7083-0815-8. OCLC 10211402.
- Medieval Anglesey. Llangefni: Anglesey Antiquarian Society. 1982. OCLC 9693231.
- Owen of Wales: the end of the House of Gwynedd. Cardiff: University of Wales Press. 1991. ISBN 978-0-7083-1064-9. OCLC 25007642.
- Carr, A. D. (1995). Medieval Wales. Basingstoke, New York: Macmillan Press, St. Martin's Press. ISBN 978-0-312-12509-7. OCLC 31206994.
- "Gwilym ap Gruffydd and the rise of the Penrhyn estate". The Welsh History Review / Cylchgrawn Hanes Cymru. 15 (1). Cardiff: University of Wales Press: 1–20. ISSN 0043-2431. OCLC 1769587.
- Carr, Antony D. (23 September 2004). "Tudor family, forebears of (1215-1404)". The Oxford Dictionary of National Biography. Oxford Dictionary of National Biography (online ed.). Oxford: Oxford University Press. doi:10.1093/ref:odnb/77357. (Subscription, Wikipedia Library access or UK public library membership required.)
- Allmand, Christopher (21 May 2015). "The Celtic World: Wales". The New Cambridge Medieval History: Volume 7, c.1415-c.1500. Cambridge: Cambridge University Press. pp. 532–546. ISBN 978-1-107-46076-8. OCLC 920809280.
- Pryce, Huw, ed. (5 March 1998). "'This my act and deed': the writing of private deeds in late medieval north Wales". Literacy in Medieval Celtic Societies. Cambridge; New York: Cambridge University Press. p. 223-237. ISBN 978-0-521-57039-8. OCLC 36501363.
- The gentry of North Wales in the later Middle Ages. Cardiff: University of Wales Press. 2017. ISBN 978-1-78683-136-1. OCLC 1023442786.
