= Clay Jones (horticulturist) =

British gardener and broadcaster (1923–1996)

David Brinley Clay Jones, OBE (6 November 1923 – 4 July 1996), known as Clay Jones, was a horticulturist and broadcaster best known as the Chairman of the BBC Radio 4 programme Gardener's Question Time. At the age of 17, with a "rich baritone voice", he was invited to join the D'Oyly Carte opera company.

He came joint tenth with Carol Klein in the BBC poll for the nation's all-time favourite gardener.

He was appointed OBE in the 1990 Birthday Honours.
