= Roy Lancaster =

English writer, broadcaster, horticulturist

Roy Lancaster CBE VMH
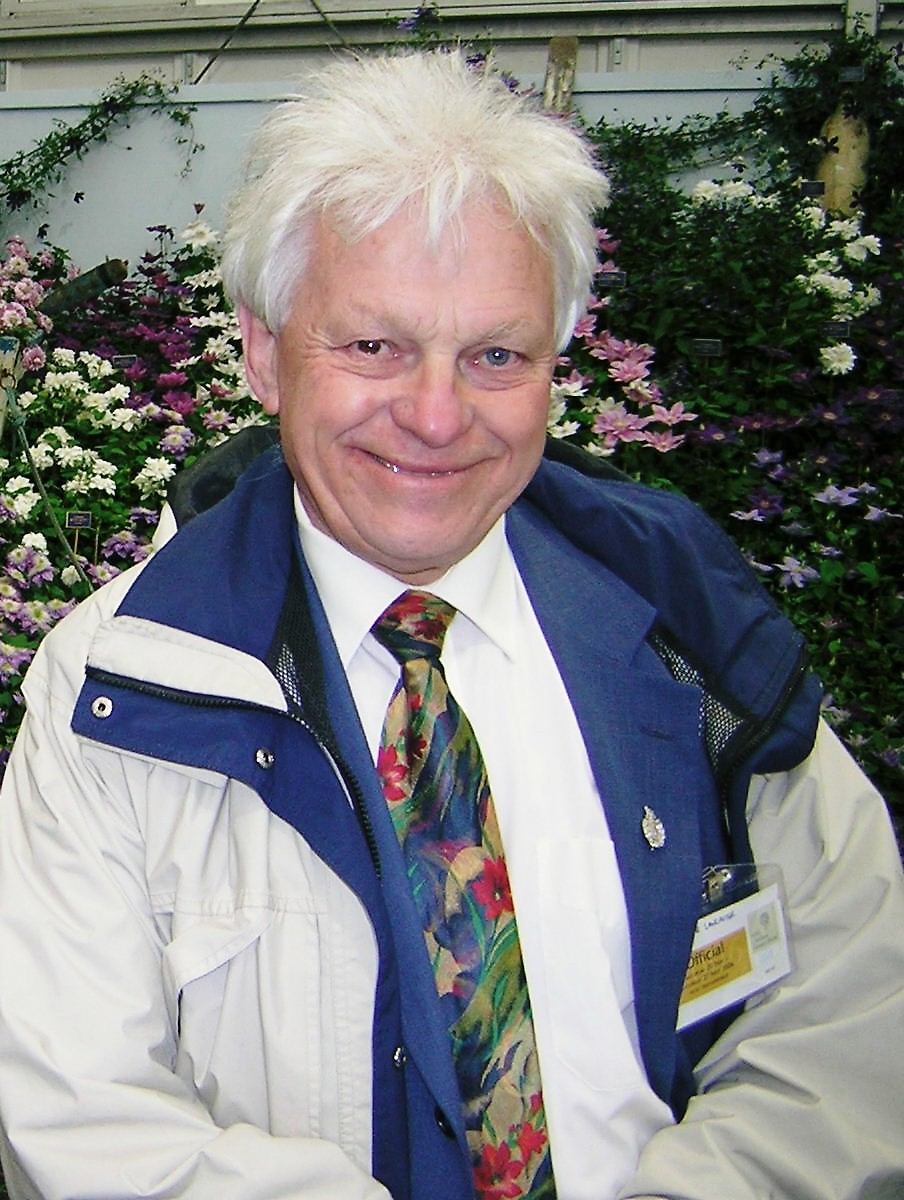
- Lancaster at the RHS Chelsea Flower Show in 2006
- Born: Charles Roy Lancaster; 5 December 1937 (age 88); Farnworth, Lancashire, United Kingdom
- Occupations: Horticulturist; broadcaster; writer
- Television: Gardeners' World
- Spouse: Susan Lloyd (1977–present)
- Children: 2

Charles Roy Lancaster CBE (born 1937) is a British plantsman, gardener, author and broadcaster.

== Background ==
Charles Roy Lancaster was born in Farnworth, Lancashire and is most widely known for his work on the long running BBC TV programme, Gardeners' World. He has also regularly appeared on the BBC Radio show Gardeners' Question Time and is also a freelance writer and lecturer.

Formerly the first Curator of the Hillier Arboretum (now the Sir Harold Hillier Gardens), he has travelled the world on plant finding expeditions. He has been a member of the Royal Horticultural Society for almost 40 years, and is vice-chairman of the society's Floral Committee B and a member of several other committees. Lancaster is also President of the Hardy Plant Society, a UK-based horticultural society that fosters interest in hardy herbaceous plants.

== Honours ==
Lancaster was awarded the Veitch Memorial Medal in 1972 and the Victoria Medal of Honour in 1988 by the Royal Horticultural Society. In the 1999 New Year Honours, he was appointed Officer of the Order of the British Empire (OBE) "for services to horticulture". In the 2014 Birthday Honours, he was promoted to Commander of the Order of the British Empire (CBE) "for services to horticulture and charity".

== Publications ==
=== Books ===
- Plant Hunting in Nepal (1981)
- In Search of the Wild Asparagus (1983)
- Garden Plants for Connoisseurs (1987)
- Trees (1987)
- A Plantsman's Paradise: Travels in China (1989)
- Shrubs Through the Seasons: Over 100 Garden Shrubs for Year-round Colour (1991)
- Trees for Your Garden (1993)
- What Plant Where (1995)
- A Plantsman in Nepal (1995)
- What Perennial Where (1997)
- What Houseplant Where (1998)
- Perfect Plant, Perfect Place (2002)
- My Life with Plants (2017)
