= Critic's Choice: Top 200 Albums =

1978 reference book by Paul Gambaccini

- Author: Paul Gambaccini
- Language: English
- Genre: Reference work
- Publisher: Omnibus Press
- Publication date: January 1978
- Publication place: United Kingdom
- Media type: Print
- ISBN: 978-0-19-537371-4

Critic's Choice: Top 200 Albums (titled Rock Critics' Choice: The Top 200 Albums in the United States) is a musical reference book compiled by American-British journalist and broadcaster Paul Gambaccini. It was first published in the United Kingdom by Omnibus Press in January 1978, and then by Quick Fox in the US. The book comprises an annotated and illustrated list of the best albums in popular music, as selected from top-ten lists provided by its 47 contributors. As a multi-contributor work seeking to critique rock and pop albums, Critic's Choice preceded The Rolling Stone Record Guide and the Greil Marcus-edited Stranded: Rock and Roll for a Desert Island, both published in 1979. It was followed by several other books that classified the best (and worst) pop recordings.

A second edition of the book was compiled in 1987 from a poll of 81 contributors. It was titled Paul Gambaccini Presents the Top 100 Albums and published by GRR/Pavilion. In the US, it was published by Harmony Books as Critics' Choice: The Top 100 Rock 'n' Roll Albums of All Time. In both editions, the number-one album was the Beatles' Sgt. Pepper's Lonely Hearts Club Band. Gambaccini's polls received some criticism, particularly from author Clinton Heylin, for departing from the purview of music critics and including contributions from radio and television broadcasters.

== 1978 edition ==
Paul Gambaccini wrote regularly for Rolling Stone magazine from 1970 and established himself as a disc jockey for BBC Radio 1 in the UK. In 1977, he asked various British and American music critics, journalists, radio broadcasters and individuals from the music industry to list their top ten albums of all time. Of the 47 people who participated, according to author Clinton Heylin, 31 were music or literary critics. Among these were Robert Christgau, Jonathan Cott, Cameron Crowe, Giovanni Dadomo, Simon Frith, Charlie Gillett, Clive James, Lenny Kaye, Greil Marcus, Dave Marsh, Lisa Robinson, John Tobler, Ed Ward, Chris Welch, Richard Williams and Ellen Willis.

From the 47 personal lists, Gambaccini created a top 200 list of albums. The book contains an entry for each album, with its track listing, LP cover and release information, and commentary from one of Gambaccini's contributors on its impact and significance. The top ten albums were as follows:

1. The Beatles Sgt. Pepper's Lonely Hearts Club Band (1967)
2. Bob Dylan Blonde on Blonde (1966)
3. Bob Dylan Highway 61 Revisited (1965)
4. Van Morrison Astral Weeks (1968)
5. The Beatles Rubber Soul (1965)
6. The Beatles Revolver (1966)
7. The Rolling Stones Exile on Main St. (1972)
8. The Rolling Stones Let It Bleed (1969)
9. The Beatles Abbey Road (1969)
10. Bruce Springsteen Born to Run (1975)

== 1987 edition ==
For the next edition of the book, Gambaccini reduced the scope to a top 100. The participants consisted of 81 critics, writers and broadcasters. Among the music critics were Frith, Gillett, Marcus, Marsh and Williams once more, and Ken Barnes, Chet Flippo, Kurt Loder, Nick Logan and Niall Stokes. The other participants included lyricist and UK chart historian Tim Rice, and several MTV video jockeys. All LP covers were reproduced in full colour. The top ten albums were as follows:

1. The Beatles Sgt. Pepper's Lonely Hearts Club Band (1967)
2. Bruce Springsteen Born to Run (1975)
3. Bob Dylan Blonde on Blonde (1966)
4. Marvin Gaye What's Going On (1971)
5. Bruce Springsteen Born in the U.S.A. (1984)
6. Elvis Presley The Sun Collection (1975)
7. The Velvet Underground The Velvet Underground & Nico (1967)
8. The Beach Boys Pet Sounds (1966)
9. Van Morrison Astral Weeks (1968)
10. The Beatles The Beatles ("White Album") (1968)

== Reception ==
In his review of the second edition, Robert Hilburn of the Los Angeles Times wrote that he enjoyed the book but regretted that Gambaccini had chosen to include so many broadcasters and media personalities among his contributors, saying, "Mark Goodman and Alan Hunter may delight MTV audiences, but their jobs have nothing to do with weighing good music." In an attempt to gauge the genuine critical response, Hilburn reduced the number of panelists to 27 – all critics and writers whose work he knew. From their personal top tens reproduced in the book, he calculated that Blonde on Blonde would have topped the list, followed by the Velvet Underground and Presley albums, with Sgt. Pepper in sixth place. In his own top ten, Hilburn placed Presley at number one and Sgt. Pepper at number four.

Writing in his 2007 book on the legacy of the Beatles' Sgt. Pepper album, The Act You've Known for All These Years, Clinton Heylin criticises the choice of contributors to the 1978 edition, due to the absence of leading critics such as Lester Bangs, Richard Goldstein, Nick Kent, Paul Nelson, Charles Shaar Murray, Tony Parsons and Paul Williams. He describes Gambaccini as a "DJ" and claims that Gambaccini excluded these critical voices because they represented a "challenging view of Rock" that was at odds with his own tastes. (Note: Among his articles for Rolling Stone throughout the 1970s, however, Gambaccini regularly wrote album reviews. Along with Bangs, Cott, Flippo, Kaye, Marsh, Nelson and several others, his early work was published when Jon Landau served as the magazine's record reviews editor.) He queries Sgt. Pepper's top ranking in the book, since the contributors' personal top tens show that Frith, Tobler and Welch were the only "bona-fide" critics who listed that album, whereas half of the 16 "outsiders", who possessed "no critical credentials (and precious little taste)", named it in their top four. Heylin adds that the more worthy 1979 publications The Rolling Stone Record Guide and Stranded corrected this misconception by presenting Sgt. Pepper less favourably, although he complains that the Rolling Stone book gave the album an overly generous four-star rating (out of five).

Amid his disapproval of the acclaim afforded Sgt. Pepper in 1987, on the occasion of its 20th anniversary and first release on CD, Heylin dismisses the second edition of Gambaccini's book and similarly ridicules a contemporary list compiled by Rolling Stone writers, titled "The 100 Best Albums of the Last Twenty Years", that placed Sgt. Pepper at number one. He says that Gambaccini produced "another uncritical edition of Critics' Choice" and "once again ... rel[ied] on some of the States' most resolutely uninformed industry figures to bolster the album's showing". (Note: Reviewing Heylin's The Act You've Known for All These Years for The Daily Telegraph in 2007, Tim Willis commented on the author's propensity for deriding Sgt. Pepper and its admirers. According to Willis: "Heylin is very cross that Pepper instantly became – and remains – a cultural icon. To him, most critics were – and remain – lazy or craven. Editors have rigged polls to mislead readers, who are so contemptible, they don't even realise that the only true Pepper is the original mono pressing.")

Music historian Joe Harrington describes the first Critic's Choice as "groundbreaking" and cites the improved ranking of The Velvet Underground & Nico in the second edition as an indication of that album's increasing historical importance. Writing in 2007, CNN entertainment reporter Todd Leopold praised the first edition of the book while ridiculing a top 200 albums list recently compiled by the Rock and Roll Hall of Fame. Leopold recalled that, as a teenage Beatles fan, reading Gambaccini's book was "revelatory" since it introduced him to new music such as the Velvet Underground, the Mothers of Invention, Love's Forever Changes album, and the Harder They Come soundtrack. He added that, "most importantly", he learned about "Robert Christgau, Greil Marcus, Dave Marsh, Ed Ward and the other contentious cornerstones of pop music criticism".
