= Brain of Britain =

British radio quiz show (since 1953)

- Brain of Britain logo
- Other names: What Do You know?; Brain of Brains; Top Brain
- Genre: General knowledge quiz
- Running time: 30 minutes
- Country of origin: United Kingdom
- Language: English
- Home station: BBC Light Programme (1953−1967); BBC Radio 2(1968−1969); BBC Radio 4 (1970−present)
- Hosted by: Franklin Engelmann (1953−1972); Robert Robinson (1973−2008); Russell Davies (2009−present)
- Recording studio: BBC Radio Theatre, London; and MediaCityUK, Salford; and regional venues
- Original release: 2 August 1953 (as part of What Do You Know?); 14 January 1968 (as a programme in its own right.)
- No. of series: 71
- Opening theme: Eine kleine Nachtmusik
- Website: www.bbc.co.uk/programmes/b00813s0

Brain of Britain is a BBC radio general knowledge quiz, broadcast on BBC Radio 4.

== History ==
Brain of Britain is the longest-running broadcast quiz show open to the general public. It began as a slot in What Do You Know? in 1953. The main part of the show was the "Brain of Britain" quiz itself, originally called "Ask Me Another". There were also several other quizzes on the show, most of which were eventually sidelined to allow "Brain of Britain" a longer running time, though the popular write-in competition "Beat the Brains" was still played as part of Brain of Britain until 2024. It became a programme in its own right in 1968.

It was chaired by Franklin Engelmann until his death in 1972. Robert Robinson was his successor, continuing in the role for 38 years.

== Format ==
Four contestants compete on each programme, in alphabetical order by surname. To begin the competition, the first contestant is asked a question; a correct answer within 10 seconds awards one point and control for the next question. An incorrect answer at any point ends the contestant's turn, and the question is offered to the others in a toss-up via silent buzzer. Regardless of who answers correctly, control then passes to the contestant after the one who initially missed it. If a contestant correctly answers five questions in a row, one bonus point is awarded and control passes to the next contestant. Each contestant is also asked one question based on a sound clip.

A contestant can score up to nine points on their turn: one for each of their own five questions, a bonus point for correctly answering all of them, and three more for successfully stealing a missed question from each opponent. The contestant with the most points at the end of the programme wins. If there is a tie for high score, the first to answer a toss-up question correctly wins.

The competition is normally split into a series of 12 heats, with the winners of these heats and the four highest scoring runners-up entering the four semi-finals. The winners of these semi-finals make it to the grand final, and the winner of the grand final becomes champion. In the 2015 contest, the fifth highest scoring runner-up qualified after the death of one of the heat winners. In the 2016 contest, five runners-up ended with the same high score. To decide which four went through to the semi-finals, a play-off took place that was not broadcast.

Until 2024 the show also featured "Beat the Brains", a segment in which two questions submitted by a listener (or, in the Grand Final, the previous series' winner) were read. The submitter won a book token if the contestants were unable to answer at least one question. The submitter was "awarded" the consolation prize of a round of applause from the audience if both questions were answered correctly. At one point, the prize was a Brain of Britain quiz book, but was replaced by the book token when the book was out of print. "Beat the Brains" was dropped in the 2026 revamp of the competition.

== Host ==
Brain of Britain was hosted by Robert Robinson for most of its life, although during his illness the 2004 series was hosted by Russell Davies. Peter Snow took over the role in 2007, also due to the illness of Robinson, dispensing with Robinson's trademark style of addressing contestants by their honorific and surname (e.g. 'Mr Blenkinsop'), preferring to use their given names. Robinson was reinstated for the autumn 2008 series, and formality returned to the proceedings; Davies hosted the show again in 2009, with the intention that Robinson would again return when his health permitted. Robinson formally retired from the show in 2010, and died in August 2011, and Davies continues as host.

== Question creation ==
Until 2007, all questions were set by one individual, who was present (but silent) during recordings. The host would consult the setter, traditionally known by a pseudonym, to adjudicate when an answer was imprecise. For many years Ian Gillies fulfilled the role, taking the name Mycroft (from Mycroft Holmes, older and wiser brother of Sherlock). After his death in April 2002, the new question setter was Kevin Ashman, who has the distinction of winning both Brain of Britain and Mastermind. He chose to be known as Jorkins, a character in Dickens' David Copperfield. From the 2007 series a team of setters was engaged, as is the practice in most other quiz shows.

== Theme music ==
For much of its life the theme music of Brain of Britain was the opening bars of the fourth movement of Wolfgang Amadeus Mozart's Eine Kleine Nachtmusik, but in a 'modernised' version by Waldo de los Ríos. This choice was the subject of frequent complaints from classical music fans (with whom the show was popular) and presenter Robert Robinson described it on air as "Mozart plus sacrilege" and "Mozart with custard". The theme was changed to a more conventional version in the early 1990s, a performance by the Academy of St Martin in the Fields conducted by Neville Marriner. The closing bars of the fourth movement are heard at the end of the final.

== Championship ==
Every three years, the three most recent champions and the highest scoring runner-up among the three recent finals compete for the Brain of Brains title, most recently held in 2021 and won by David Stainer. Every nine years, the three most recent Brain of Brains winners compete for the Top Brain title; Mark Grant was the most recent winner in 2018.

== Record score ==
The record individual score on a programme is 38 by Kevin Ashman (who went on to become six times World Quizzing Champion, also holds the record for the highest ever score at 41 on Mastermind, became a Brain of Britain question setter and one of the Eggheads) in 1996. The record individual score in a final is 35, achieved by Peter Barlow (1981), Peter Bates (1984) and Kevin Ashman himself (1996).

== Broadcast ==
Brain of Britain was also broadcast on BBC World Service for many years; in fact, American talk show host David Letterman was a fan of the show, and invited 1993 winner Geoffrey Colton to appear on his talk show. However, some World Service broadcasts had cuts in them to fit the show as well as a news bulletin into the time slot, resulting in some apparent rules irregularities (for example, a contestant would be asked a question and give a correct answer, and then the next question would go to another contestant without it being the first contestant's fifth consecutive correct answer).

== Hiatus and Reboot ==
The first heat of the 2024 series was broadcast on 1 September and the final on 22 December 2024. A new series, due to begin in September 2025, did not materialize. It was reported that the two BBC producers Paul Bajoria and Stephen Garner, together responsible for the BBC Radio 4 quizzes Counterpoint, Brain of Britain and Round Britain Quiz, had left the BBC.

BBC Radio Commissioning issued an Invitation to Tender in July 2025, looking for production companies "to take on [...] Brain of Britain, and refresh it" for transmission in "approximately June 2026". Telltale Industries, working with David Bodycombe, produced the 2026 series with recording taking place in between May and July that year and broadcasts scheduled for July to November. Recordings were made in a number of smaller venues including Sands End Arts and Community Centre and The Other Palace in London and Manchester Recording Studios, rather than the BBC Radio Theatre.

The 2026 Semi-finals and Final were recorded at the Royal Birmingham Conservatoire on the weekend of July 25-26. Heat 1, 2026 aired on BBC Radio 4 on July 26. A new feature added for the 2026 series was the Spotlight round. Contestants submitted their choice of special interest before the competition such as "Apollo Moon Landings," "organelles," or "the fall of the Aztecs," which allowed questions on those topics to be developed. Each contestant had one Spotlight round, during which as usual they continued to answer until they reached a maximum of five correct answers on their chosen topic. The "Beat the Brains" round no longer appeared in the 2026 series and the convention of asking questions by alphabetical order of surname was dropped in favour of order of given names. The winner of the new format series was Ailsa Watson.

== Series champions ==
=== Regular series ===
Year	Winner	Host
1954	David Martin Dakin	Franklin Engelmann
1955	Arthur Maddocks	Franklin Engelmann
1956	Antony Carr	Franklin Engelmann
1957	Rosemary Watson	Franklin Engelmann
1958	David Keys	Franklin Engelmann
1959	Dr Reginald Webster	Franklin Engelmann
1960	Patrick Bowing	Franklin Engelmann
1961	Irene Thomas	Franklin Engelmann
1962	Henry Button	Franklin Engelmann
1963	Ian Barton	Franklin Engelmann
1964	Ian Gillies	Franklin Engelmann
1965	Bob Crampsey	Franklin Engelmann
1966	Richard Best	Franklin Engelmann
1967	Julian Loring	Franklin Engelmann
1968	Ralph Raby	Franklin Engelmann
1969	T. D. Thomson	Franklin Engelmann
1970	Ian Matheson	Franklin Engelmann
1971	Fred Morgan	Franklin Engelmann
1972	Aubrey Lawrence	Franklin Engelmann
1972	Aubrey Lawrence	Engelmann/Ian Gillies (Note: Gillies chaired the 1972 final after Engelmann died mid-series.)
1973	Glyn Court	Robert Robinson
1974	Roger Pritchard	Robert Robinson
1975	Winifred Lawson	Robert Robinson
1976	Thomas Dyer	Robert Robinson
1977	Martin Gostelow	Robert Robinson
1978	James Nesbitt	Robert Robinson
1979	Arthur Gerard	Robert Robinson
1980	Tim Paxton	Robert Robinson
1981	Peter Barlow	Robert Robinson
1982	John Pusey	Robert Robinson
1983	Sue Marshall	Robert Robinson
1984	Peter Bates	Robert Robinson
1985	Richard Fife	Robert Robinson
1986	Stephen Gore	Robert Robinson
1987	Ian Sutton	Robert Robinson
1988	Paul Monaghan	Robert Robinson
1989	Barbara Thompson	Robert Robinson
1990	Jim Eccleson	Robert Robinson
1991	Chris Wright	Robert Robinson
1992	Mike Billson	Robert Robinson
1993	Geoffrey Colton	Robert Robinson
1994	Ian Wynn-Mackenzie	Robert Robinson
1995	Ian Kinloch	Robert Robinson
1996	Kevin Ashman	Robert Robinson
1997	Daphne Fowler	Robert Robinson
1998	Guy Herbert	Robert Robinson
1999	Leslie Duncalf	Robert Robinson
2000	Mike Smith-Rawnsley	Robert Robinson
2001	Tom Corfe	Robert Robinson
2002	David Jones	Robert Robinson
2003	David Stedman	Robert Robinson
2004	Alan Bennett	Robert Robinson/Russell Davies
2005	Christopher Hughes	Robert Robinson
2006	Pat Gibson	Robert Robinson
2007	Mark Bytheway	Peter Snow
2009	Geoff Thomas	Robert Robinson
2010	Ian Bayley	Russell Davies
2011	Dr. Iwan Thomas	Russell Davies
2012	Ray Ward	Russell Davies
2013	Barry Simmons	Russell Davies
2014	Mark Grant	Russell Davies
2015	Nigel Jones	Russell Davies
2016	Mike Clark	Russell Davies
2017	John Beynon	Russell Davies
2018	Clive Dunning	Russell Davies
2019	David Stainer	Russell Davies
2020	Graham Barker	Russell Davies
2021	Karl Whelan	Russell Davies
2022	Sarah Trevarthen	Russell Davies
2023	Dan Adler	Russell Davies
2024	Tim Hall	Russell Davies
2026	Ailsa Watson	Russell Davies

=== Brain of Brains ===
Year	Winner	Host
1954-56	Antony Carr	Franklin Engelmann
1957-59	Reginald Webster	Franklin Engelmann
1960-62	Irene Thomas	Franklin Engelmann
1963-65	Ian Gillies	Franklin Engelmann
1966-68	Ralph Raby	Franklin Engelmann
1969-71	Iain Matheson	Franklin Engelmann
1972-74	Roger Pritchard	Robert Robinson
1975-77	Thomas Dyer	Robert Robinson
1978-80	James Nesbitt	Robert Robinson
1981-83	Peter Barlow	Robert Robinson
1984-86	Richard Fife	Robert Robinson
1987-89	Glen Binnie (Note: Binnie was runner-up to Barbara Thompson in 1989, taking her place after Thompson was unable to take part in Brain of Brains.)	Robert Robinson
1990-92	Mike Billson	Robert Robinson
1993-95	Geoffrey Colton	Robert Robinson
1996-98	Kevin Ashman	Robert Robinson
1999-2001	Leslie Duncalf	Robert Robinson
2002-04	Alan Bennett	Russell Davies
2005-07	Mark Bytheway	Robert Robinson
2009-11	Ian Bayley	Russell Davies
2012-14	Mark Grant	Russell Davies
2015-17	John Beynon	Russell Davies
2018-20	David Stainer	Russell Davies
2021-23	Karl Whelan	Russell Davies

=== Top Brain ===
Year	Winner	Host
1954-62	Anthony Carr	Franklin Engelmann
1963-71	Ian Gillies	Franklin Engelmann
1972-80	Roger Pritchard	Robert Robinson
1981-89	Peter Barlow	Robert Robinson
1990-98	Kevin Ashman	Robert Robinson
1999-2007	Mark Bytheway	Robert Robinson
2009-17	Mark Grant	Russell Davies
