= Edward Seckerson =

British music journalist and radio presenter

Edward Seckerson is a British music journalist and radio presenter specialising in musical theatre. Formerly Chief Classical Music Critic of the Independent, Seckerson is a writer, broadcaster and podcaster. He wrote and presented the long-running BBC Radio 3 series Stage & Screen in which he interviewed many of the most prominent writers and stars of musical theatre. He appears regularly on BBC Radio 3 and 4. On television, he has commentated a number of times at the Cardiff Singer of the World competition. He has published books on Mahler and the conductor Michael Tilson Thomas, and has been on Gramophone Magazine’s review panel for many years. Seckerson presented the long-running BBC Radio Four musical quiz Counterpoint for one year in 2007, after the death of Ned Sherrin.

Notable people he has interviewed include Leonard Bernstein, Liza Minnelli, Paul McCartney, Pavarotti, Julie Andrews, and Jessye Norman.

== Journalist and critic ==
Seckerson is currently a member of the review panel for Gramophone Magazine.

Previous appointments as reviewer and critic include:

- Chief Classical Music Critic of the Independent
- Chief Music Critic for The Sunday Correspondent
- Music Critic for The Guardian
- Classical Music Magazine
- BBC Music Magazine
- Hi-Fi News & Record Review Magazine
- The Strad
- The Times and The Sunday Times

== Broadcaster ==
=== BBC Radio 3 ===
He has served as writer and presenter on the stage and screen for BBC Radio 3. This long-running series included Seckerson’s interviews with Julie Andrews, Angela Lansbury, Liza Minnelli, Patti LuPone, Barbara Cook, Michael Ball, Stephen Sondheim, Elaine Paige, Andrew Lloyd Webber, Elton John

He is presenter of Weekend Morning on 3 and The BBC Proms Afternoon Performance CD Review – incl. Building a Library and the annual ‘Critics Choice’ Nightwaves The Changing Voice In Character.

Mining The Archive Performance on 3

=== BBC Radio 4 ===
Seckerson was the presenter of Counterpoint on BBC Radio 4, 2007, Kaleidoscope special with Paul McCartney, and Woman's Hour with Elaine Paige

=== Television ===
BBC Cardiff Singer of the World coverage Julie Andrews sings Richard Rodgers - Polygram Video/TV Special Leonard Bernstein: Reaching for the Note Jacqueline du Pré: Playing With Fire The South Bank Show: Leif Ove Andsnes Maxim Vengerov: Playing By Heart

=== Podcasts ===
English National Opera Glyndebourne Festival Opera London Philharmonic Orchestra City of London Festival Joseph Weinberger Ltd (all also available via The Independent Online) Stage and Screen Online

== Public appearances ==
Seckerson was on the judging panel for The Voice of Musical Theatre Competition in Cardiff and The Sondheim Prize. He moderated public interviews with Stephen Sondheim (Queen's Theatre, London) and Charles Strouse (Shaw Theatre, London) Pre-performance events for the BBC Proms, English National Opera, Cheltenham Festival, London Philharmonic Orchestra, Royal Philharmonic Orchestra Royal Opera House, Covent Garden: public interviews with Bryn Terfel, Renee Fleming, John Tomlinson, Jonas Kaufmann, Juan Diego Florez Wigmore Hall: Evenings with Anja Silja and Margaret Price

== Acting ==
Radio: Numerous dramas incl. The Archers, BBC Radio 4: Peter Stephens

=== Film ===
Young Winston (dir Richard Attenborough), Julia (dir Fred Zinnemann), and A Bridge Too Far, (dir Richard Attenborough)

- A Bridge Too Far (1977) - British Padre (Last appearance)

=== Television ===
The Regiment Get Some In

- Get Some In! (1977) - LAC driver

=== Theatre ===
Bristol Old Vic Tyneside Theatre Company Timothy West Company at the Billingham Forum Edinburgh Festival Fringe

== Publications ==
Mahler: His Life and Times (Omnibus Press) Michael Tilson Thomas: Viva Voce - a collection of conversations with the American conductor (Faber and Faber)

Liner notes & EPK Promotional Videos for Deutsche Gramophone, EMI, Decca, and others.

Essays on Leonard Bernstein's Candide and The Merry Wives of Windor in Music for the Edinburgh Festival and Royal Shakespeare Company programmes
