= Hardy Plant Society =

British charity

The Hardy Plant Society is a British charity that promotes the cultivation of hardy herbaceous plants. The society was founded in 1957 by a group of gardeners and nurserymen. It has approximately 7,500 members and provides information about familiar and less well known perennials, how to grow them and where they may be obtained. The society also works towards ensuring that garden-worthy perennial plants remain in cultivation and have the widest distribution. Its president is Roy Lancaster.

== Activities ==
The society aims to inform and encourage the novice gardener, stimulate and enlighten the more knowledgeable, and entertain and enthuse all gardeners bonded by a love for, and an interest in, hardy perennial plants. Throughout the year there is a wide range of events hosted by local group members, from plant study days to residential weekends to garden visits. The society exhibits at local and national shows throughout the country to stimulate interest in hardy plants. Visitors can see hardy plants in bloom and leaf in their natural season and find out more about the work of the society. An extensive library of digital images covering a wide range of plants and garden scenes is available to members and members of the public. Images have been donated by photographers in the society.

=== Conservation ===
The Hardy Plant Society is concerned about the conservation of garden plants to propagate and pass on older, rarer or lesser-known garden plants in danger of being lost. Countless fine plants have totally disappeared from cultivation and remain but a memory. The society is working towards ensuring that older, rarer and lesser-known perennial plants are conserved and made available to gardeners generally. Members suggest plants which they believe are garden-worthy but hard to source and they are grown in members' gardens so their hardiness and tolerance to different growing conditions can be compared across the country – information that is collected in a database and reflected on the society's webpages as a resource for HPS members and the public.

=== Seed distribution scheme ===
The Hardy Plant Society promotes the conservation and propagation of hardy perennial plants by running an annual scheme where members can give or receive seeds and have access to more than 2,000 different types of plants.

== Membership ==
National membership of the society gives members the opportunity to join a local group and take part in a range of activities. There are around 40 local groups across the UK and national members are invited to join the group nearest to them. Each group offers a range of gardening activities including lectures from gardening speakers, garden visits, plant sales and educational and social events throughout the year. Most groups produce their own newsletters.

Within the society there are groups for members with a special interest in particular groups of plants or those which require particular growing conditions. There are special interest groups covering Galanthus, Half Hardy Plants, Hardy Geraniums, Peonies, Pulmonarias, Ranunculaceae, Shade and Woodland Plants and Variegated Plants. They produce their own newsletters and organise meetings and events for fellow enthusiasts. The Correspondents Group enables members who are unable to attend meetings to remain in touch with one another and exchange gardening ideas and information.

== Publications ==
The Hardy Plant Society produces a twice-yearly journal, The Hardy Plant, with contributions from leading UK and international plant enthusiasts. It contains articles on hardy perennials and gardens as well as contributions from members. A newsletter is circulated three times a year that provides information on all the society's events, activities, interests and group contacts.

The society publishes a series of booklets on a range of hardy plants including Geraniums, Peonies and Hostas. These can be ordered via the website.

== Bursaries ==
The Hardy Plant Society offers a number of small bursaries, for students and for people who are employed in horticulture, to enable them to develop their knowledge and understanding. Grants are usually made to support travel and subsistence costs for project work or study modules on topics broadly related to the society's aims and objectives. The bursaries are made available as a result of a generous legacy to the society from the estate of Kenneth Black.
