= Franklin Engelmann =

British radio personality

Henry Franklin Engelmann (4 March 1908 – 2 March 1972) was a radio personality popular in Britain in the 1950s and 1960s, particularly as the host of Down Your Way and Gardeners' Question Time.

== Life and career ==
Franklin Engelmann was born in Wood Green, London, the son of Friedrich August E. Engelmann (1874–1950), a German importer, and his wife, Ida Josephine Cox (1875–1967), born in Worcester. He first worked as a dealer in oil shares on the London Stock Exchange, and was a member of the Stock Exchange Dramatic and Operatic Society. His first broadcast followed a request by NBC to stand in as a commentator on London events, and in 1940 he joined the BBC as an announcer. He served with the Royal Engineers during the Second World War, and worked with the Allied Expeditionary Forces.

In 1946 he became a presenter with the BBC Light Programme, later working freelance. He was best known for hosting Down Your Way (1955–1972), in which he took part in 730 programmes; Gardeners' Question Time (1961–1972); and the quiz show What Do You Know?, which later became Brain of Britain. In October 1955 he was also the original host of Pick of the Pops, before it was hosted by Alan Freeman and later David Jacobs. He was nicknamed "Jingle". He narrated A.J. Cronin's 1937 novel The Citadel.

He married in 1945 at the British Embassy church in Paris, and had two daughters.

He died of a heart attack two days before his 64th birthday, when he was due to host the 1000th edition of Gardeners' Question Time.

== Filmography ==
Year	Title	Role	Notes
1963	Heavens Above!	TV Commentator	
