= Nigel Colborn =

British television presenter

Nigel Colborn VMH is a British TV presenter and gardening expert/writer. He is a former presenter of the long running BBC Gardeners World. He has been a panelist on BBC Radio 4’s Gardeners Question Time and is a regular presenter of Granada TV's Gorgeous Gardens.

His mother was the nursery woman Pamela Underwood and he attended King's Ely.

He wrote and presented BBC Radio 4's 'In a Monastery Garden'. He has written many gardening books, including 'Short Cuts to Great Gardens'; 'Great Plants for Small Gardens'; 'A Flower for Every Day'. As a journalist he has written about gardening, travel and the countryside for The Daily Mail, The Times, Sunday Times and also on his own blog, Silver Tree Daze.

He is a trustee & Vice Chair of The Royal Horticultural Society and has judged at the Chelsea Flower Show.
