= Gardeners' Question Time =

BBC radio programme

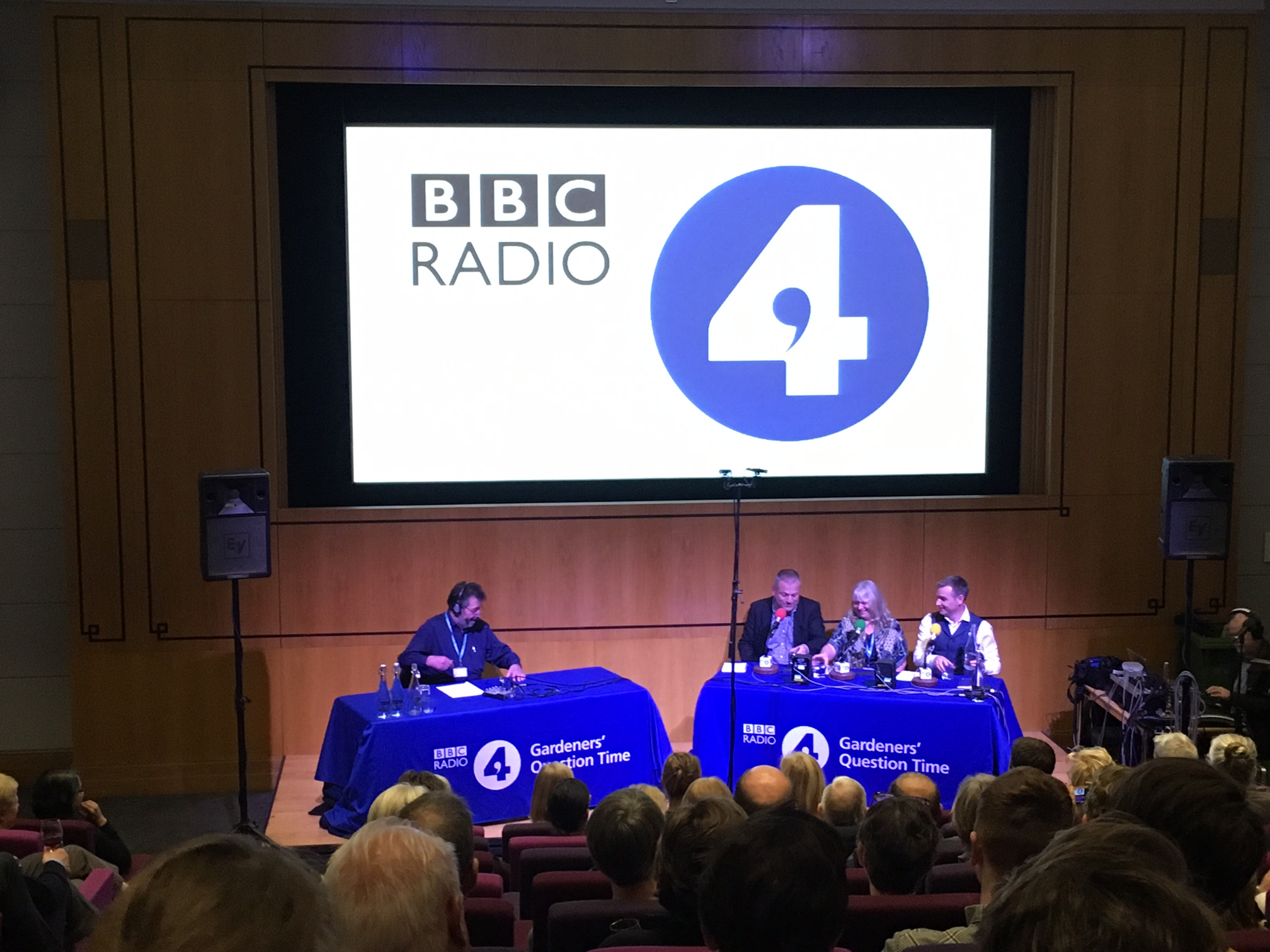
- Eric Robson chairs a live recording of Gardeners' Question Time at the Wellcome Collection in 2017. On the panel are Matt Biggs, Anne Swithinbank and Chris Beardshaw.
- Other names: How Does Your Garden Grow? (1947–1950); Down the Garden Path (1950–1957)
- Genre: Factual/panel show
- Running time: 45 minutes
- Country of origin: United Kingdom
- Language: English
- Home station: BBC Home Service (1947–1950, 1957–1967); BBC Light Programme (1950–1957); BBC Radio 4 (1967–present)
- Hosted by: Kathy Clugston
- Original release: 9 April 1947 – present
- Audio format: Stereo
- Website: Gardeners' Question Time at BBC Radio 4

Gardeners' Question Time is a long running BBC Radio 4 programme in which amateur gardeners can put questions to a panel of experts.

== History ==
The first programme was broadcast in the North and Northern Ireland Home Service of the BBC at 22:15 on 9 April 1947 and came from the "singing room" at the Broadoak Hotel, Ashton-under-Lyne. Originally entitled How Does Your Garden Grow?, it was inspired by the wartime Dig for Victory campaign. On the first panel were Bill Sowerbutts, Fred Loads, Tom Clark and Dr E.W. Sansome.

Professor Alan Gemmell joined Loads and Sowerbutts in 1950 when their contrasting styles (Professor, Traditional Head gardener and Commercial Grower) added an entertainment element. The success of the format led to the programme's being broadcast nationally on Saturday mornings at 11:00 from 27 April to 13 July 1957 on the BBC Light Programme (under the title Down the Garden Path). In September 1957 the programme was transferred to the Home Service and gained its present title of Gardeners' Question Time as well as the time slot of 14:00 on Sundays which it has retained to this day. The programme marked its 1,000th edition in 1972, though the occasion was overshadowed by the death of long-serving chairman Franklin Engelmann just days earlier.

The format and panel remained largely unchanged for many years. In 1994, production moved to outside company Taylor Made Broadcast; the complete panel was discarded by the BBC and moved to the new Classic FM station on a short-term contract to present Classic Gardening Forum, sponsored by the Cheltenham and Gloucester Building Society. In 2009, the production of the show was taken over by the UK's largest independent radio production company Somethin' Else. The programme's audience figures continue to perform strongly as confirmed by the official audience measurement body, RAJAR.

== Format ==
The programme typically comes from a village hall or other public venue somewhere in Britain, or occasionally further afield, such as in the Republic of Ireland or northern France. GQT often records at special locations throughout the UK, including on a moving train, the peak of Snowdon, from inside the Tower of London and in December 2016 from the state dining room at 10 Downing Street.

There are also regular editions in which the panel answer questions sent in by post or email, known as "postbag editions". These editions are recorded in a specially adapted potting shed at Sparsholt College near Sparsholt, Hampshire; however, in recent years postbag programmes have been recorded at various gardens around the UK, including at Highgrove, with Prince Charles, Kew Gardens, RHS Wisley, Ness Botanic Gardens and East Ruston Old Vicarage.

Each year the programme visits a botanic garden to stage its annual GQT Summer Garden Party. The event includes seminars and talks given by the panel, a chance to receive first hand advice from a panellist inside the GQT Potting Shed, plus two programme recordings. A highlight of the horticultural calendar, the event attracts a large audience of keen amateur gardeners. Most recently the Summer Garden Party has been hosted by Royal Botanic Garden Edinburgh, National Botanic Garden of Wales and Ness Botanic Gardens.

Since 2001, Gardeners' Question Time factsheets have been made available after each episode covering all questions and their given answers. The factsheets can be found by searching for a particular episode and scrolling down the page.

In 2009, the programme launched a podcast edition and a Twitter account, the latter designed to be a place where listeners can share gardening ideas and tips and comment on the radio programme's topics and panellists' answers.

The programme regularly attracts an audience in excess of two million and has answered over 35,000 questions in its long run.

== Panellists ==
Current panellists include Matthew Wilson, Chris Beardshaw,Bob Flowerdew, Pippa Greenwood, Bunny Guinness, Anne Swithinbank, James Wong, Matthew Pottage, Marcus Chilton-Jones, Juliet Sargeant and Christine Walkden.

Past participants have included Matthew Biggs,John Cushnie, Dr Stefan Buczacki, David Burges, Fred Downham, Professor Alan Gemmell, Walter Gilmore, Jill Hicking, Clay Jones, Nigel Colborn, Daphne Ledward, Fred Loads, Bridget Moody, Martin Fish, David Jones, Sue Phillipps, Geoffrey Smith, Sid Robertson, Roy Lancaster and Bill Sowerbutts.

Past chairmen were Bob Stead, Franklin Engelmann, Michael Barratt, Steve Race, Ken Ford, Les Cottington, Clay Jones, and Stefan Buczacki. On 26 April 2019 Eric Robson, host for 25 years, chaired his last programme. His replacement as chair was BBC radio newsreader Kathy Clugston.
