= Bill Sowerbutts =

William Edmund Sowerbutts (4 January 1911 – 28 May 1990) was an English gardener and panellist on the long-running BBC Radio 4 programme Gardeners Question Time.

Born in Ashton-under-Lyne, Lancashire, the son of a market gardener, Sowerbutts wanted to become a journalist on leaving school, but his father died when he was 16 and he started work on the family's smallholding. The family first opened a stall on Oldham's Victoria Market and later on Ashton's outdoor market.

Sowerbutts toured the area giving lectures to local gardening and allotment societies. He went on to appear in the first edition of How Does Your Garden Grow?, soon renamed Gardeners' Question Time, an offshoot of the World War II Dig for Victory campaign. The first programme was broadcast from the Singing Room at the Broadoak Hotel in Ashton-under-Lyne on 9 April 1947. On the first panel along with Bill were Fred Loads, Tom Clark and Dr E.W. Sansome. Sowerbutts and Loads later went on to become household names, appearing every Sunday at 2 p.m. on the BBC Home Service. In 1950, Professor Alan Gemmell joined. The banter between the trio attracted a large following, with the listenership building up to two million.

Tameside Council placed a Blue plaque in his honour on the Broadoak Hotel.
