= Bob Flowerdew =

British organic gardener & broadcaster

- Occupation: Organic gardener
- Employer: Self-employed
- Known for: Ambassador for Garden Organic
- Board member of: President of the Norfolk group of the Soil Association
- Spouse: Vonnetta
- Children: Italia and Malachi

Bob Flowerdew is an organic gardener and television and radio presenter. He is a regular panel member of BBC Radio 4's Gardeners' Question Time. He has nearly an acre of garden in Dickleburgh, Norfolk, England, where he lives with his wife, Vonnetta, a care worker, and their twins, Italia and Malachi.

He is known as one of Britain's leading organic gardeners. He is the son of a farmer and his family have been working the land in East Anglia since before the time of the Tudors. After graduating in financial management, he worked his way around Europe and North America, becoming fascinated by the different gardening and farming methods, returning to pick grapes with one French family for 12 successive years.

Flowerdew runs a consultancy landscape service, is president of the Norfolk group of the Soil Association and also teaches at an agricultural college. He has worked in television, presenting the Channel 4 series Muck and Magic, and appeared on Sophie Grigson's Grow Your Own Greens, on which he was the sweetcorn expert. He is a long-serving member of the panel of BBC Radio 4's "Gardener's Question Time." He writes regularly for a gardening blog, Under Cover with Bob Flowerdew. He is the patron of Waveney Foodbank, a local charity that provides emergency food for those in crisis.

== Books ==
He has written books on gardening including:

- 2008 Grow your Own, Eat your Own: Bob Flowerdew's Guide to Making the Most of your Garden Produce
- 2007 Going Organic: The Good Gardener's Guide to Getting it Right
- 2007 Gourmet Gardener: Everything You Need to Know to Grow and Prepare the Very Finest of Flowers, Fruits and Vegetables
- 2004 The No-Work Garden: Getting the Most Out of Your Garden for the Least Amount of Work
- 1998 Bob Flowerdew's Organic Bible
- 1995 Bob Flowerdew's Complete Fruit Book
- 1995 Bob Flowerdew's Complete Book of Companion Gardening
- 1993 The Organic Gardener
