= Godfrey Papillon =

English cricketer

Personal information
- Full name: Godfrey Keppel Papillon
- Born: 24 September 1867; Lexden, Essex, England
- Died: 14 August 1942 (aged 74); Hexham, Northumberland, England
- Batting: Right-handed
- Role: Occasional wicket-keeper
- Relatives: Thomas Garnier (grandfather); John Garnier (uncle); George Tottenham (cousin); Henry Tindall (brother-in-law)

Domestic team information
- Years: Team
- 1901–1903: Northamptonshire

Career statistics
Competition	First-class
Matches	1
Runs scored	10
Batting average	10.00
100s/50s	–/–
Top score	10
Balls bowled	–
Wickets	–
Bowling average	–
5 wickets in innings	–
10 wickets in match	–
Best bowling	–
Catches/stumpings	1/–
- Source: Cricinfo, 12 October 2013

Godfrey Keppel Papillon (24 September 1867 – 14 August 1942) was an English cricketer. Papillon was a right-handed batsman.

The son of Philip Oxendon Papillon and Emily Caroline Garnier, Papillon was born at Lexden Manor at Lexden, Essex. Papillon appeared once in first-class cricket when he was selected to represent the Gentlemen in the Gentlemen v Players fixture of 1892 at the Central Recreation Ground, Hastings. In a match which ended as a draw, Papillon batted once in the Gentlemen's first-innings, scoring 10 runs before he was dismissed by William Attewell. He later played minor counties cricket for Northamptonshire, debuting for the county in the 1901 Minor Counties Championship against Hertfordshire. He played minor counties cricket for Northamptonshire until 1903, making twenty further appearances in the Minor Counties Championship.

He married Jessie Winifred Wilson Paton in 1899. He died at Hexham, Northumberland, on 14 August 1942. Several of his relatives were also first-class cricketers.
