= Dean Garnier =

Dean Garnier may refer to:

- Thomas Garnier (dean of Winchester) (father)
- Thomas Garnier (dean of Lincoln) (son)
