= Woodgate, Leicester =

Neighbourhood in England's East Midlands

Coordinates: 52.644°N 1.148°W

Houses in Woodgate, Leicester. This view is of Central Road looking towards Repton Street.

Map of the Woodgate area of Leicester

Woodgate is an area in Leicester in Fosse Ward. It lies west of the River Soar and is an important entrance to the city leading on to Frog Island. Its western end lies at the 'Fiveways Junction, an intersection of Fosse Road North, Groby Road, Blackbird Road and Buckminster Road. To the south is the Rally Park, which was formerly the goods yard of the London Midland Railway, and originally the route of the Leicester to Swannington Railway built by Robert Stephenson in 1832. To the west is Fosse Road North. At its eastern end Woodgate terminates at the North Bridge over the old River Soar.

== History ==
The name dates from the medieval period. It likely comes from the history of using this road to bring timber into the town from the nearby woodlands. It was the road to the various 'Frith' placenames on the west side of Leicester, which were parks within Leicester Forest where the medieval townspeople had rights to gather firewood.

The majority of the housing in Woodgate dates from the late 19th century, and like Newfoundpool was developed mainly by local builder Orson Wright. Before that time the area north of Woodgate, known as St Leonard's, was the principal residential area, and had been so for many centuries. Woodgate was a Housing Action Area in the late 1980s, when many properties were refurbished by Leicester City Council. It forms part of the current regeneration plans for the city, which has included roadworks and tree planting along Woodgate, and a mural on the wall of the old Premier Screw site.

There have been many changes to Woodgate over the years. In the past Woodgate had a significant number of active factories, including hosiery, dyeworks, an iron foundry, light engineering and biscuit manufacture. The area has suffered from industrial decline, most recently with the closure of The Premier Screw and Repetition factory with over 100 redundancies. This site was pulled down and is now used for secondhand car sales. The land between Repton Street and the river Soar has been cleared with plans to build housing, if the area is secured from flooding. The former pubs, "The Friar Tuck" and "The Old Robin Hood" became derelict - the Friar Tuck became a supermarket and the Old Robin Hood is now a shisha cafe. On Frog Island, the Foresters Arms became a thriving music venue closely associated with Stayfree Music rehearsal rooms and studio, over the road. The former Nabisco factory site, home to a few small businesses and local Labour party offices was demolished in April 2008. This is the site of a new Aldi supermarket, opened in November 2008. Other local businesses lie down Storey Street. The gothic Victorian St Leonard's Parish Church was demolished in 1983 and was replaced with a Kwikfit service station. St Leonard's Vicarage went at much the same time and was replaced by a car showroom.

Woodgate itself remains a busy local shopping street with a florist, hairdressers and barbers, physiotherapist, accountant, bakery, newsagents, DIY shop, Indian restaurant and other takeaways. It has a well-used and active community centre. There is a primary school based on Balfour Street, and another on Slater Street.

=== St Leonard's Church ===
Since medieval times the Woodgate area, along with Frog Island, had formed the parish of St Leonard's, with a parish church dating to at least 1220, and probably from before the founding of Leicester Abbey in 1134. (It was an advowson of Leicester Abbey, and as all the extant Leicester churches had been granted to the Abbey by Robert de Beaumont, 2nd Earl of Leicester in 1134, this is a possible explanation for the advowson.) Both the area and the church were impoverished and at various times it was too poor to appoint a vicar. In 1517 the building was said to be in disrepair, and by 1611 it was so dilapidated they applied for permission to pull down parts of it to provide materials to repair the rest. There were so few people living in the parish that they could easily be accommodated in the reduced area. How effective this was is unknown, but it is said that in 1645, during the English Civil War, with the Royalist forces besieging the city, the church tower was demolished as it commanded the North Bridge. For the next 230 years St Leonard's was a parish without a church, although the burial ground remained in use until after the opening of Welford Road Cemetery in 1849.

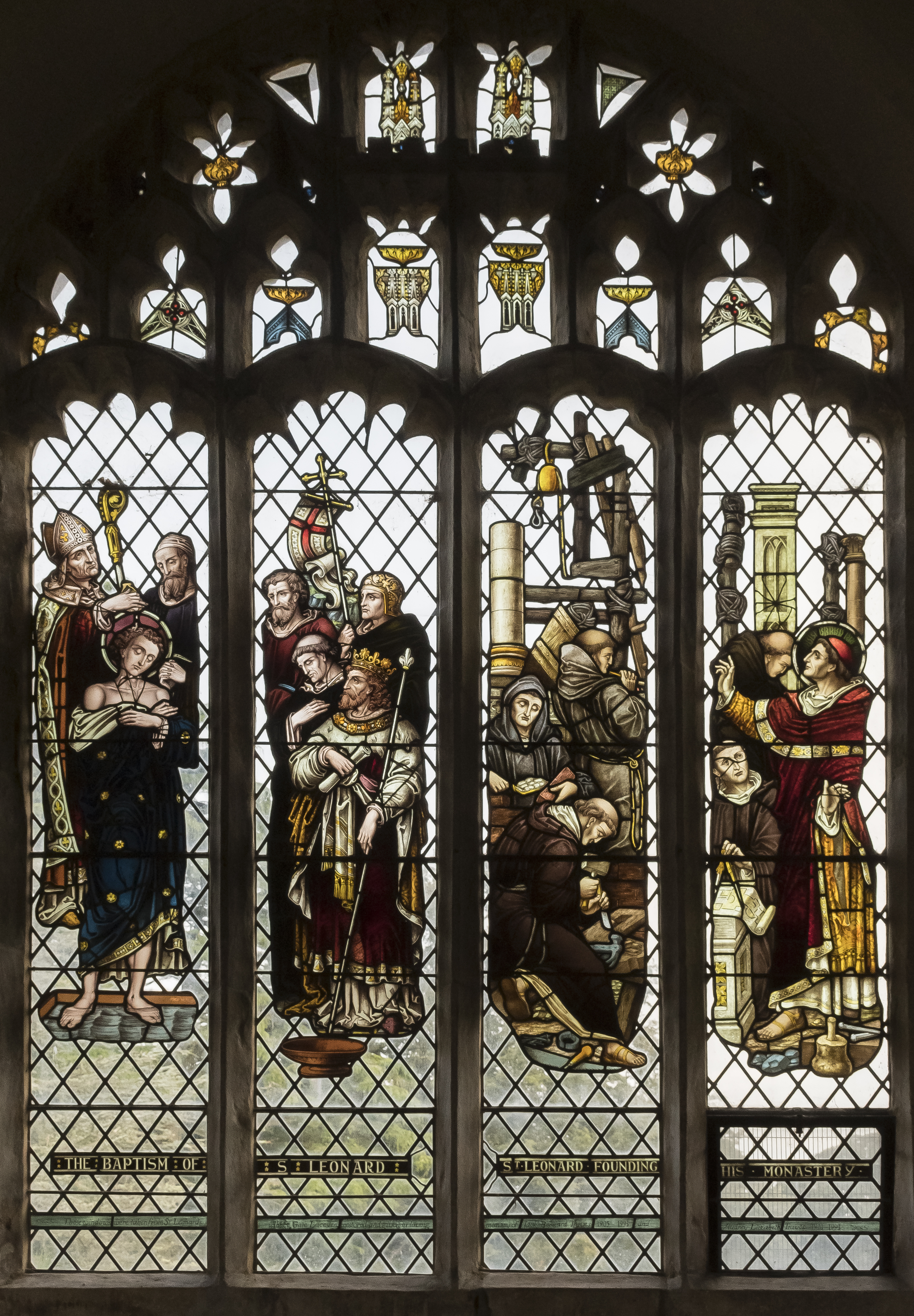
Church stained glass, now in South Ormsby, Lincolnshire, from St Leonard's, Woodgate.

During the 230 years without a church, parish duties mainly fell to the vicar of All Saints', although in the 19th century is became more usual for St Margaret's to have the responsibility. In 1846 a parish school was built in the St Leonard's Churchyard, and in 1874, with a great expansion in housing nearby, the Anglican Diocese of Peterborough, through the Leicester Church Extension Association, appointed a vicar for the parish. Services were initially held in the school, and in 1876 work began on the new church, situated on the corner of Woodgate and Abbey Gate. Built in an austere version of Gothic Revival architecture, mainly from Mountsorrel granite, the church had been designed by Leicester architects Frederick Webster Ordish and John Charles Traylen, and the final cost was £7,600. The church was built with a nave, chancel, and south aisle. The plans also provided for a tower and spire, plus a north aisle, but finances never allowed them to proceed with these.

In 1970 a Leicester Diocese report recommended the closure of the church, and the parish to be merged with St Margaret's. Although the move was resisted for 11 years, the final service was held on 26 April 1981, and the building itself was demolished in October 1984. Amongst the dispersed fittings and fixtures, stained glass showing the life of St Leonard found a new home at St Leonard's Church, South Ormsby.]

== Sites ==
The area is in Fosse Ward for local government purposes and part of the Leicester West parliamentary constituency at Westminster, the local MP from May 2010 is Liz Kendall. Previous MPs were Patricia Hewitt, Greville Janner and his father Barnett Janner.

The Woodgate Community Centre is used for local social gatherings: it was formerly a library.

Also near to Woodgate is the Woodgate Adventure Playground on the Rally Park which is used by local children for recreation. It recently celebrated its 40th anniversary of serving the community's children. The former Midland railway line is now the Forest Way cycle/foot path leading in the direction of Glenfield and Groby to the north, and towards Leicester city centre to the south.

The 'Fiveways Junction' was dubbed 'Leicester's most confusing junction' in 2023, at the start of a £10.4m overhaul of the layout between Autumn 2023 and spring 2024, requiring one or both directions of Woodgate traffic to be closed while work progressed.
