= Thomas Garnier =

Thomas Garnier may refer to:

- Thomas Garnier (dean of Winchester) (1776–1873), "the elder", English churchman and botanist
- Thomas Garnier (dean of Lincoln) (1809–1863), "the younger", Dean of Lincoln, England
- Thomas Garnier (cricketer) (1841–1898), English cleric and cricketer

== See also ==
- Thomas Garner (1839–1906), architect
