= John Garnier =

John Garnier may refer to:

- John Garnier (Royal Navy officer) (1934–2026), Royal Navy officer and courtier
- John Carpenter Garnier (1839–1926), English politician
- John Garnier (cricketer) (1813–1838), English cricketer and clergyman
