= Traylen and Lenton =

Architectural practice in Stamford, England

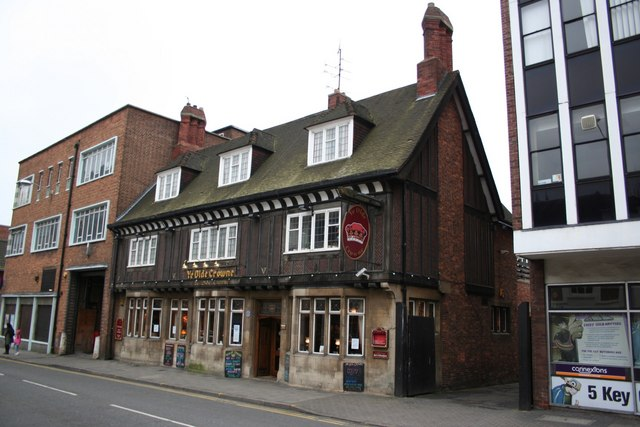
- Ye Olde Crowne, Clasketgate, Lincoln

Practice information
- Partners: H. F. Traylen and F. J. Lenton
- Founded: 1921
- Dissolved: c.1945, but continued by F. J. Lenton
- Location: Stamford

Significant works and honors
- Projects: Public houses for James Hole & Company, Brewers

Traylen and Lenton was an architectural practice in Stamford, Lincolnshire. The practice had offices at 16 Broad Street, Stamford and were the successors to a line of architects working in Stamford, starting in the 1830s with Bryan Browning and continued by his son Edward Browning. The Brownings' practice was purchased by John Charles Traylen in 1888. Henry Francis Traylen became a partner in the practice and sole proprietor after his father's death in 1907. Frederick James Lenton worked as his assistant from 1908 until he became a partner in the practice with Traylen in 1921/2. The partnership had offices in Newark, Grantham and Peterborough, as well as Stamford.

== The partners ==
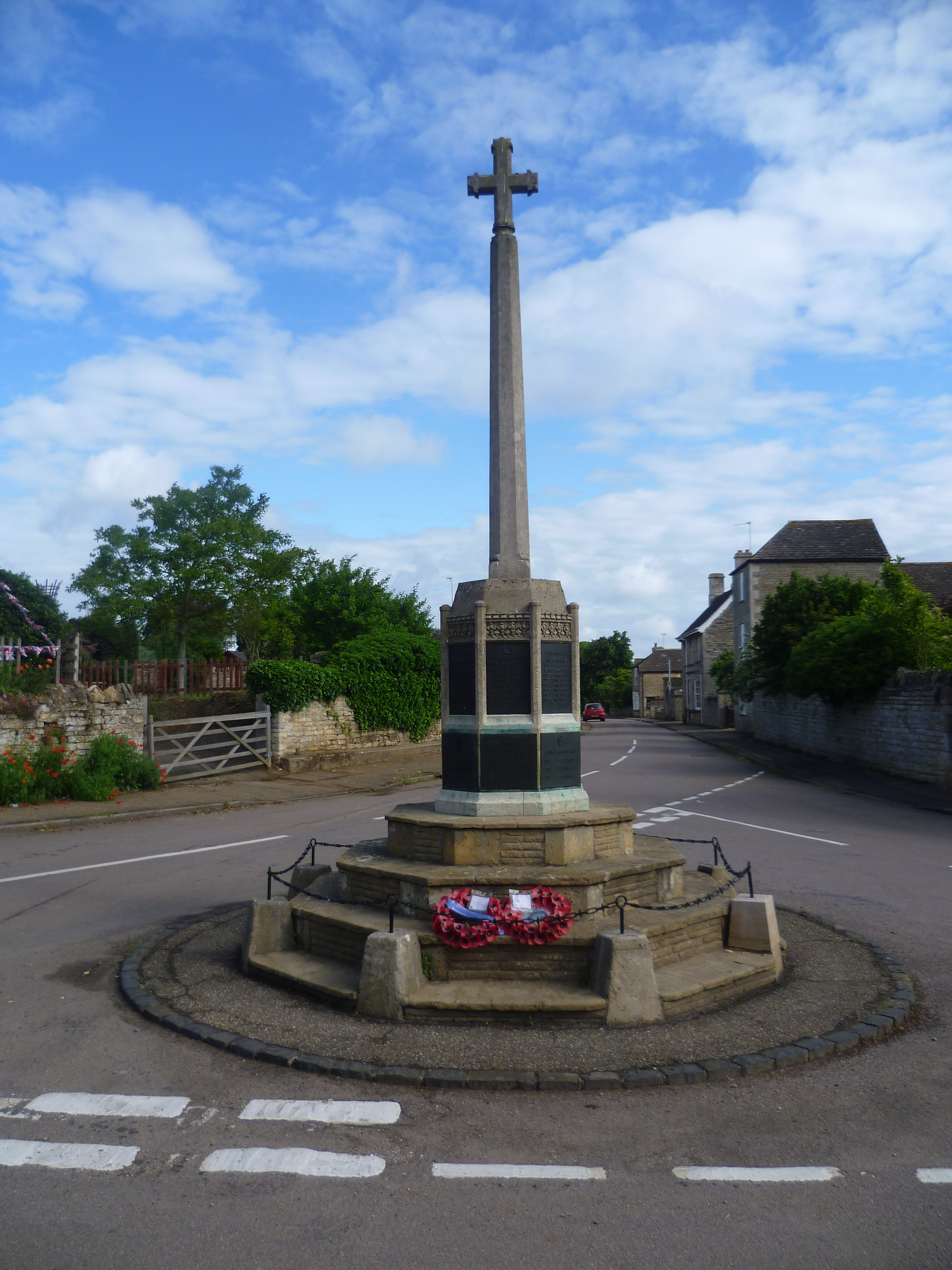
The war memorial at Easton on the Hill, Northamptonshire, by Henry Francis Traylen, 1920

Henry Francis Traylen (1874-1947) was the son of John Charles Traylen. Born in Leicester and educated at Stamford School, (1884-1891). He was articled to his father, 1891-5 and passed qualifying exams for the RIBA in 1894. Assistant at the Leicester architectural practice of Everard and Pick, 1895-c.1900 and attended Peterborough and Leicester Colleges of Art, 1895-c.1899; ARIBA 1899, awarded RIBA Silver Star for measured drawings of Burghley House, 1901. He returned to Stamford because of his father's ill health, and worked with him until his father's death in 1907. During the First World War, Traylen worked for the War Office supervising the construction of temporary military buildings. After the war, he designed a large number of war memorials in Eastern England, which are often recognisable by their Gothic detailing. In 1927 Traylen was elected Fellow of the Society of Antiquaries of London (FSA) and became its local secretary for Lincolnshire and Rutland. He retired in 1945.

Frederick James Lenton (1888-1950) was articled to the Stamford architect T. J. Ward from 1904-1908 and then joined John Charles Traylen as his assistant. He became an ARIBA in 1912.

== Public buildings ==
- Corn Exchange, Stamford; restoration work.

== Hospitals ==
- Grantham Hospital.

== Conservation projects ==
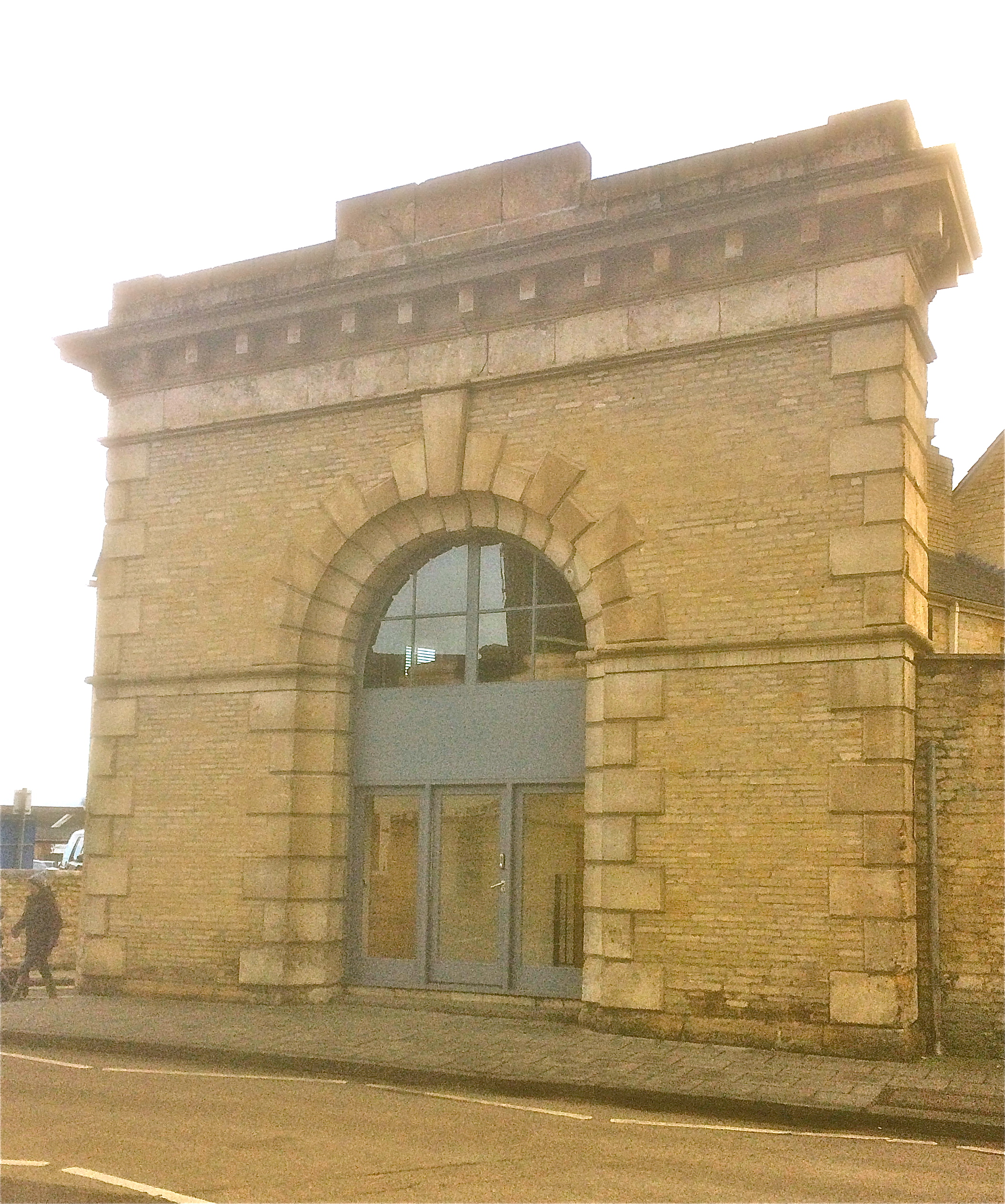
Portal to Grant's iron foundry on Wharf Road, Stamford, by Browning (1845); moved by Traylen in 1937

While Traylen tended to concentrate on church restoration work and Lenton on secular and domestic buildings, Traylen was a forceful advocate, protecting, recording and rebuilding historic buildings in a sympathetic style if demolition was inevitable.

Examples are:

In 1934 he weighed in strongly against the inspectorate of the Office of Works, when they claimed that nothing of historic value had been found during the removal of the mound of Stamford castle, for a bus station. Traylen’s photographs in Stamford Museum show details castle keep discovered during demolition and he was instrumental in moving a threatened historic doorway from 10 High Street to the only remaining upstanding part of the castle. He also preserved the threatened 17th-century building behind the Stamford Mercury office, which was re-erected on the Sheep Market frontage of the bus station.

In 1937 he saved the 1845 monumental arch during the widening of Wharf Road in 1937 by repositioning it parallel to the street. It survived then and also the recent redevelopment of the site.

In 1938 he saved a 17th-century bay from a demolished house in St Leonard’s Street and moved it to Barnack to front the house of the artist Wilfrid Wood.

== Houses ==
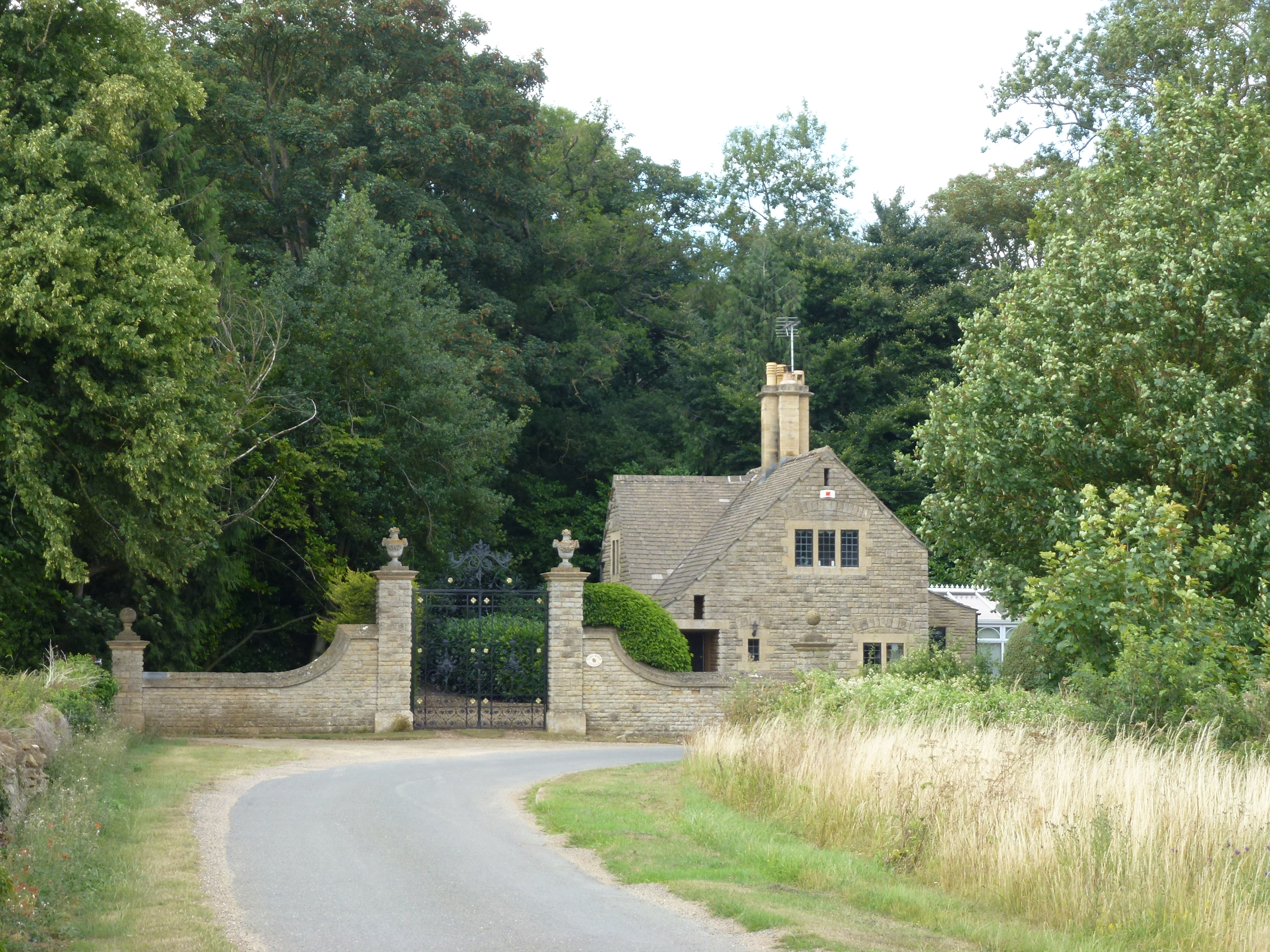
Oaks Wood Cottage, Thornhaugh Hall lodge

- The park of Thornhaugh Hall, Thornhaugh near Peterborough, is entered by two gateways with adjacent gatekeeper's lodges which were presumably designed by Traylen.
- South Lawn, St Paul's Street, Stamford. 1911
- Greyfriars, St Paul's Street, Stamford. 1911
- Wansford House 1913.

== Public houses ==
=== Apethorpe ===
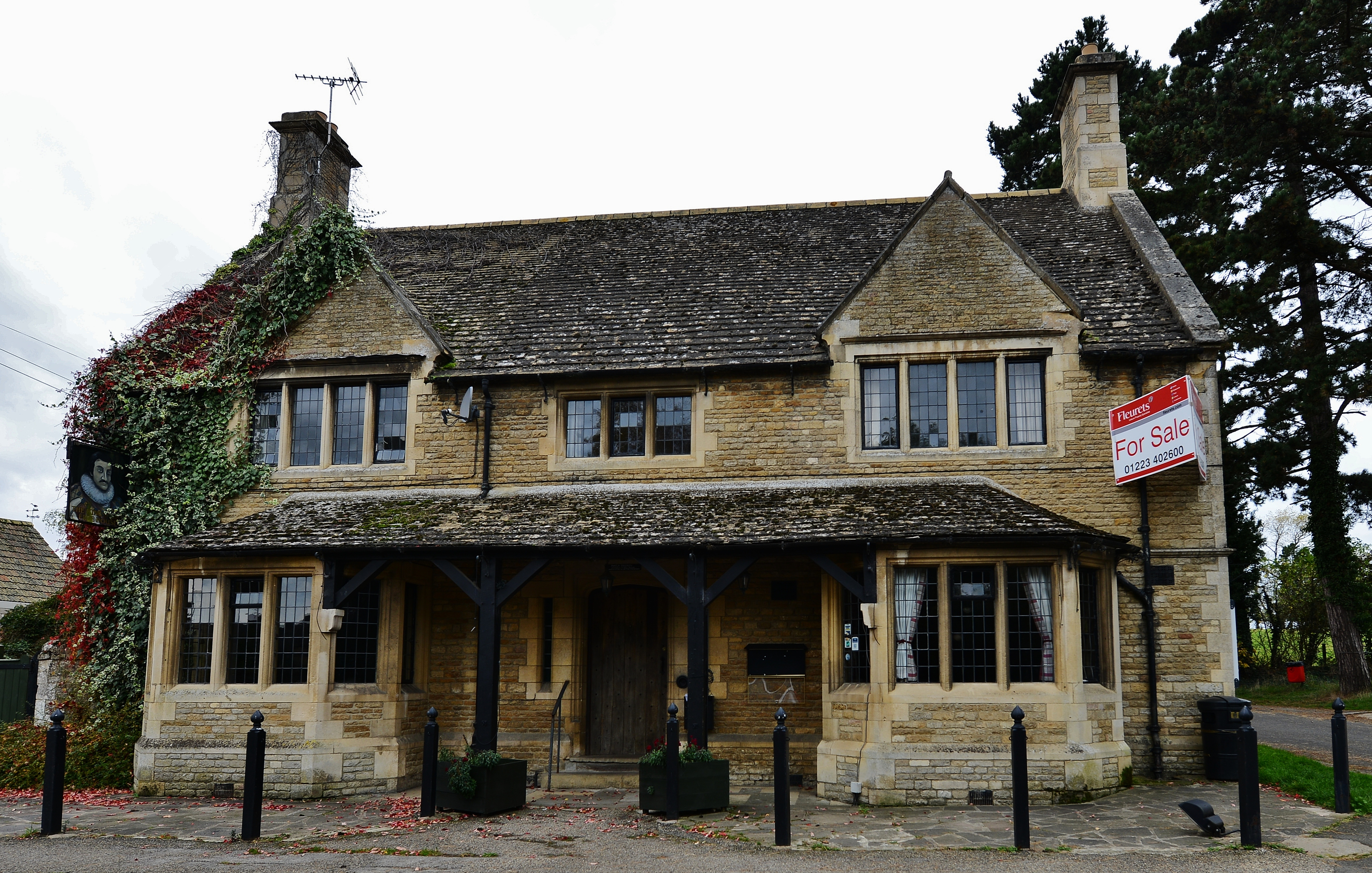
Apethorpe - former King's Head 1913

- New Inn, now the King's Head. 1913.

=== Lincoln ===
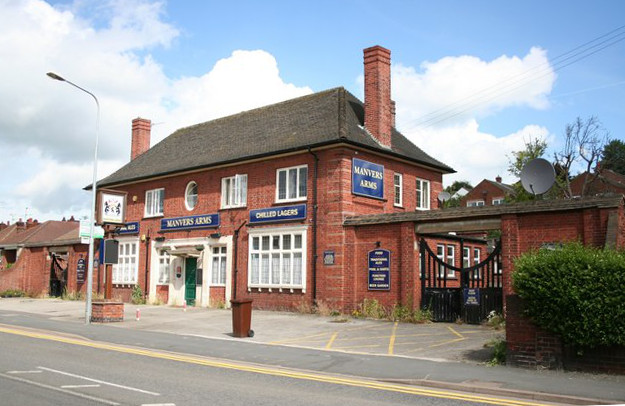
Manvers Arms, Lincoln

- The Duke of Wellington, 37 Broadgate, Lincoln.(1932) Public House first recorded in 1842, owned by Dawber's Brewery in Lincoln and sold to Mowbray & Co. Rebuilt by Traylen and Lenton in a Neo-Georgian Style in 1932. Closed 2011 and now Optima Designs.
- Ye Olde Crowne, Clasketgate, Lincoln (1937). The building replicates many features of the Olde Crowne which was demolished to make way for this building.
- New Manvers Arms (1934), Monks Road, Lincoln for Mowbray and Company. Neo-Georgian brick. Closed 2007 and demolished shortly afterwards
- The Roaring Meg (1939), Nettleham Road, Lincoln; Mowbray and Company

=== Stamford. ===
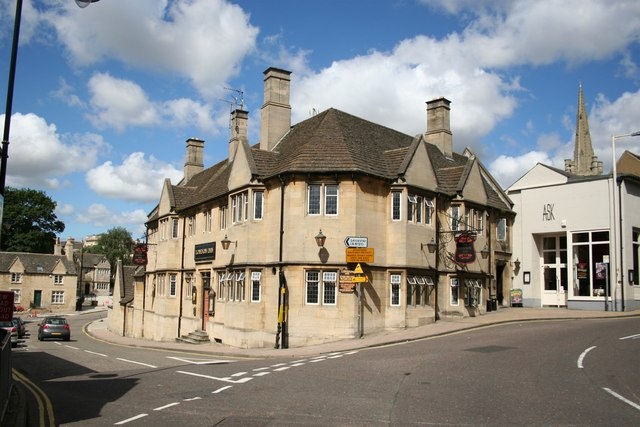
The London Inn, Stamford

- London Inn, Stamford. The London Inn, at the junction of St John's and Castle Streets was built 1939-40 in a Stamford early 17th-century vernacular domestic style. It is built in ashlared Limestone. It is topped by a steeply pitched Collyweston slate roof with late 17th- early 18th-century style chimney stacks. The building is of two storeys consisting of two façades and a splayed corner There are four gabled early 17th-century style canted bays, two on each façade. The fenestration of the main building is regular and all the windows have ovolo moulded jams, mullions and lintels.
- Half Moon Inn, Stamford. (1938) Corner of Star Street with St Paul's Street. Built in a Stamford early 17th-century vernacular domestic style. Local Lincolnshire ashlar limestone, with a Collyweston slate roof. All the visible frontages are in traditional materials. Most of the window jambs, door frames and quoins are of artificial stone, though some on the St Paul's Street façade are natural stone. The fenestration, particularly on the Star Lane façade, do not line up with those on the ground floor, There is a single four-light window, while the remainder are three-light, under the larger gable on the Star Lane façade. following function’. Steeply pitched roof with three stone chimney stacks in a late 17th- or early 18th-century style.

== Churches restored by Traylen and Lenton ==
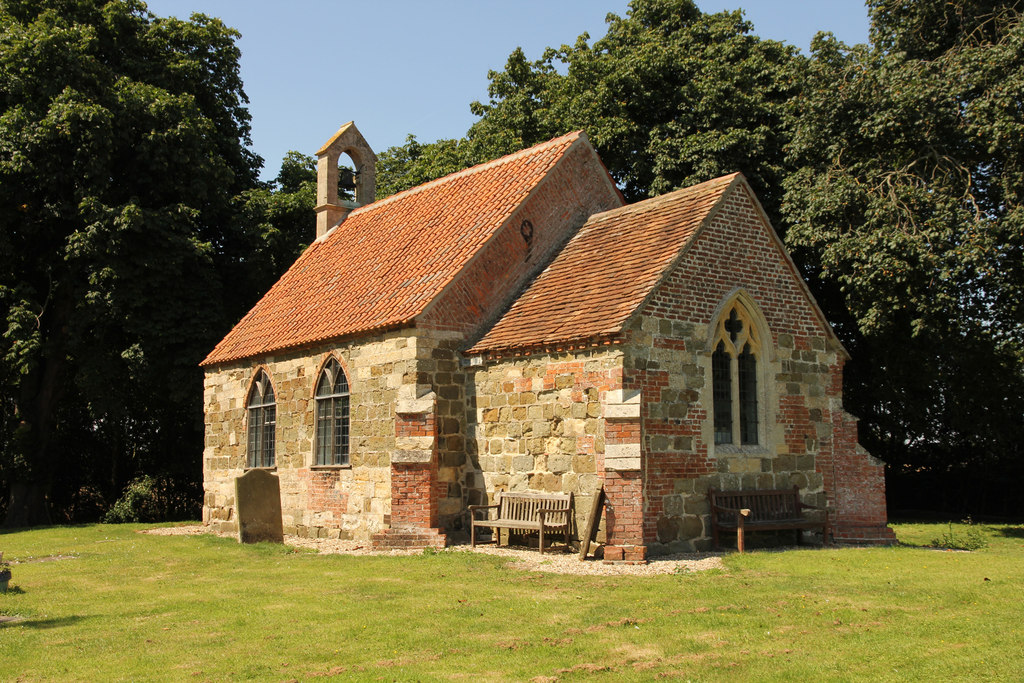
St Margaret's, Waddingworth

- St Margaret's Church, Waddingworth, Lincolnshire (1913). Grade II listed 13th- and 14th-century church restored in 1808 and again by Henry Traylen in 1913.

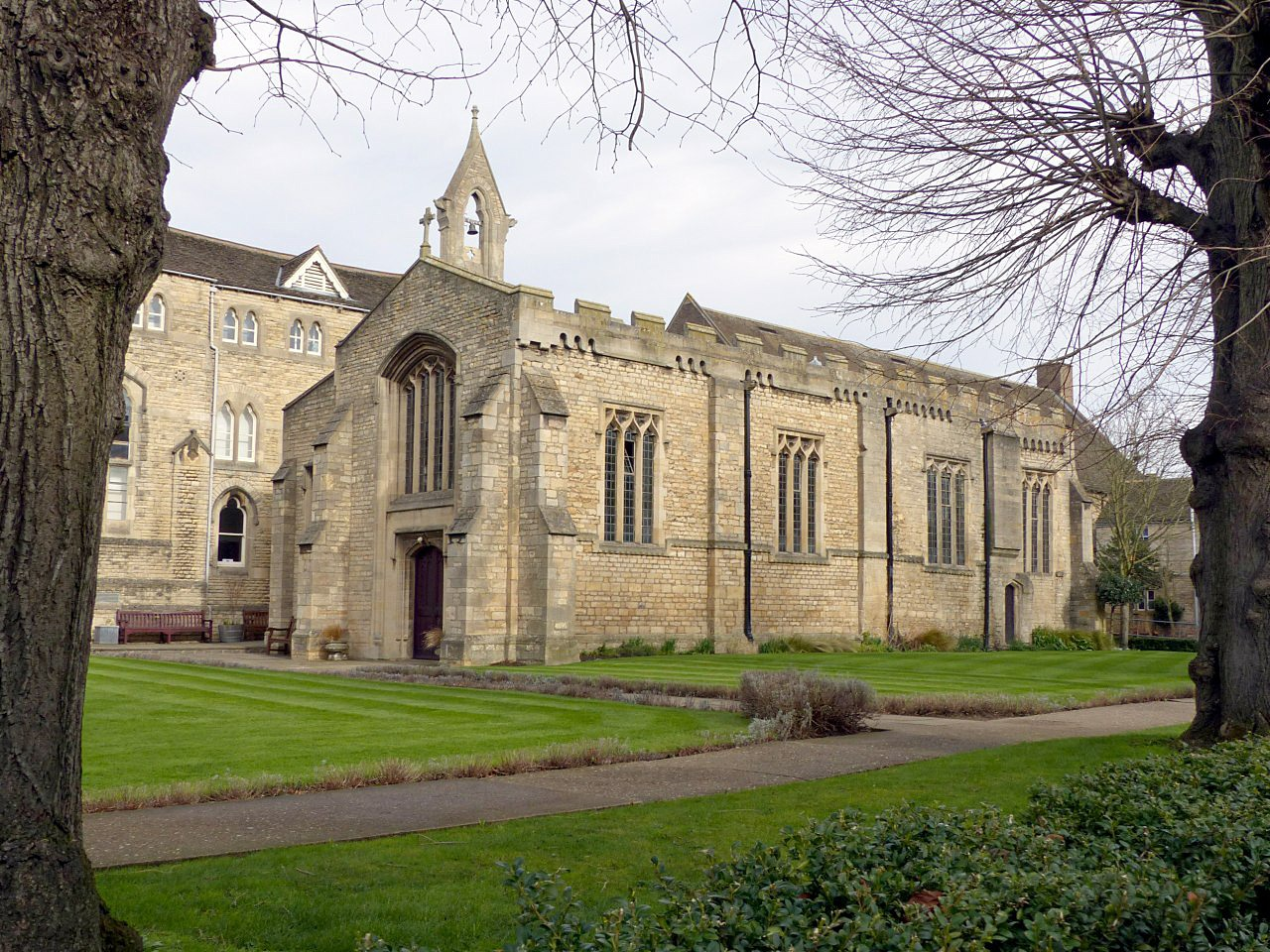
Stamford School Chapel

- St Paul's Church, Stamford (the chapel of Stamford School) restored and extended in 1929-30 for use as the school chapel in commemoration of those old boys and staff who had died in the First World War. The school was founded in 1532 and c.1548 moved into St Paul's Church. The church was probably shortened at this time. The east end remained as a schoolroom until 1930, restored as a chapel, with two bays to the west being added by Messrs. Traylen and Lenton. Some masonry remains at the east end from the 11th and 12th centuries. Listed Grade II.

== War memorials ==
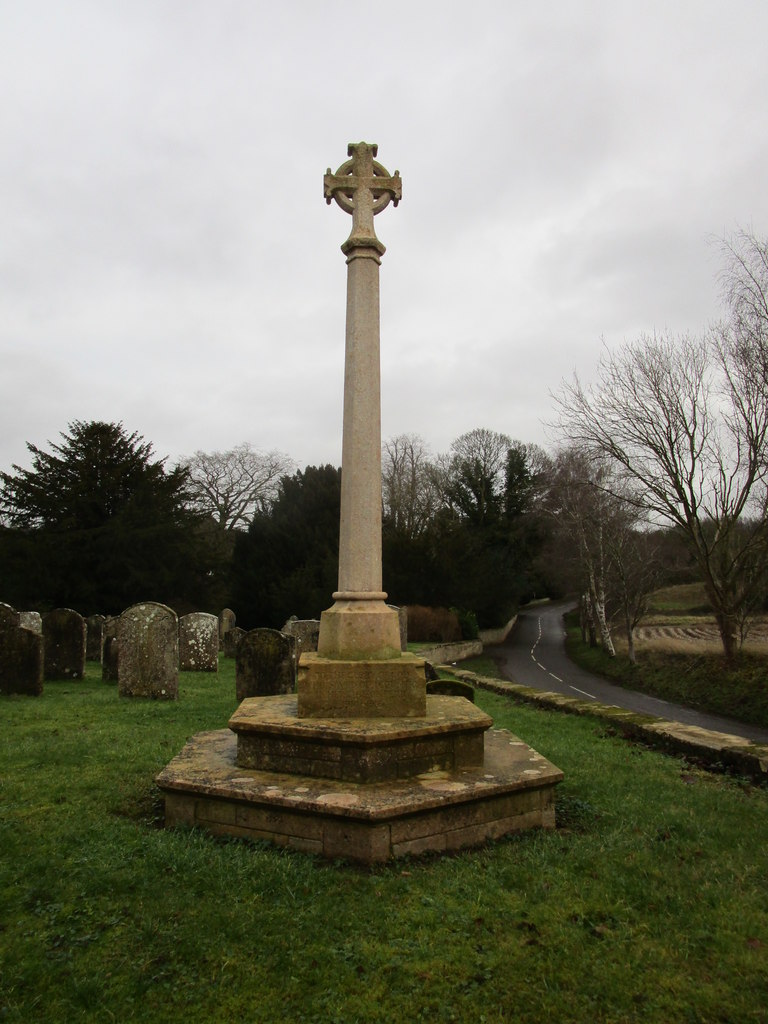
War Memorial, Thornhaugh

Traylen designing a large number of war memorials: e.g. Broad Street, Stamford, village crosses at Apethorpe, Easton-on-the-Hill, churchyard crosses at Belton-in-Rutland, Collyweston, Thornhaugh, Werrington, lychgate at Weston, Lincolnshire and many other memorials: panels, tablets, lychgates, doorways throughout Eastern England.

== Literature ==
- Antram N (revised), Pevsner N & Harris J, (1989), The Buildings of England: Lincolnshire, Yale University Press.
- Brodie A. (ed), Directory of British Architects, 1834–1914: 2 Vols, British Architectural Library, Royal Institute of British Architects, 2001.
