= St Leonard's Church, Lexden =

Coordinates: 51.889595°N 0.863445°E

Church of St Leonard, Lexden
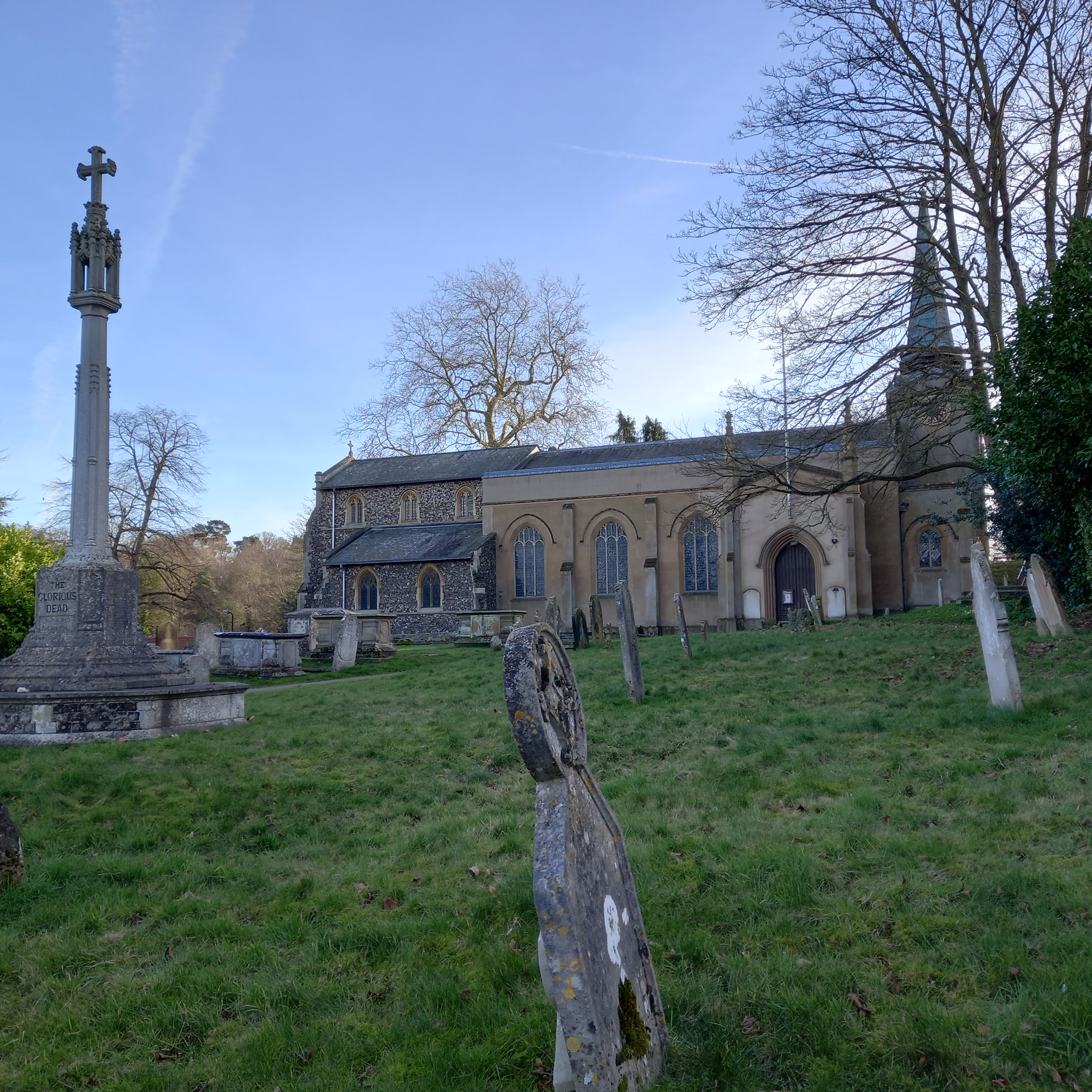
- Church of St Leonard from the north

- Location in Essex
- Location: Lexden, Essex, England
- Denomination: Church of England
- Website: www.stleonardslexden.org.uk

History
- Dedication: Saint Leonard of Noblac

Architecture
- Heritage designation: Grade II
- Designated: 19 February 1959
- Architect: Mark Greystone Thompson
- Style: Neo-Early English and Perpendicular gothic
- Years built: 1820-21

Administration
- Province: Canterbury
- Diocese: Chelmsford
- Archdeaconry: Colchester
- Deanery: Colchester
- Benefice: Lexden

The Church of Saint Leonard is a Church of England parish church in Lexden, a suburb of Colchester in Essex, England. Originating in the early 12th century, the medieval building became unsafe and was demolished in 1820. A new church building was completed in 1821, with an extension added in 1892. It is recorded in the National Heritage List for England as a Grade II listed building,

== Description ==
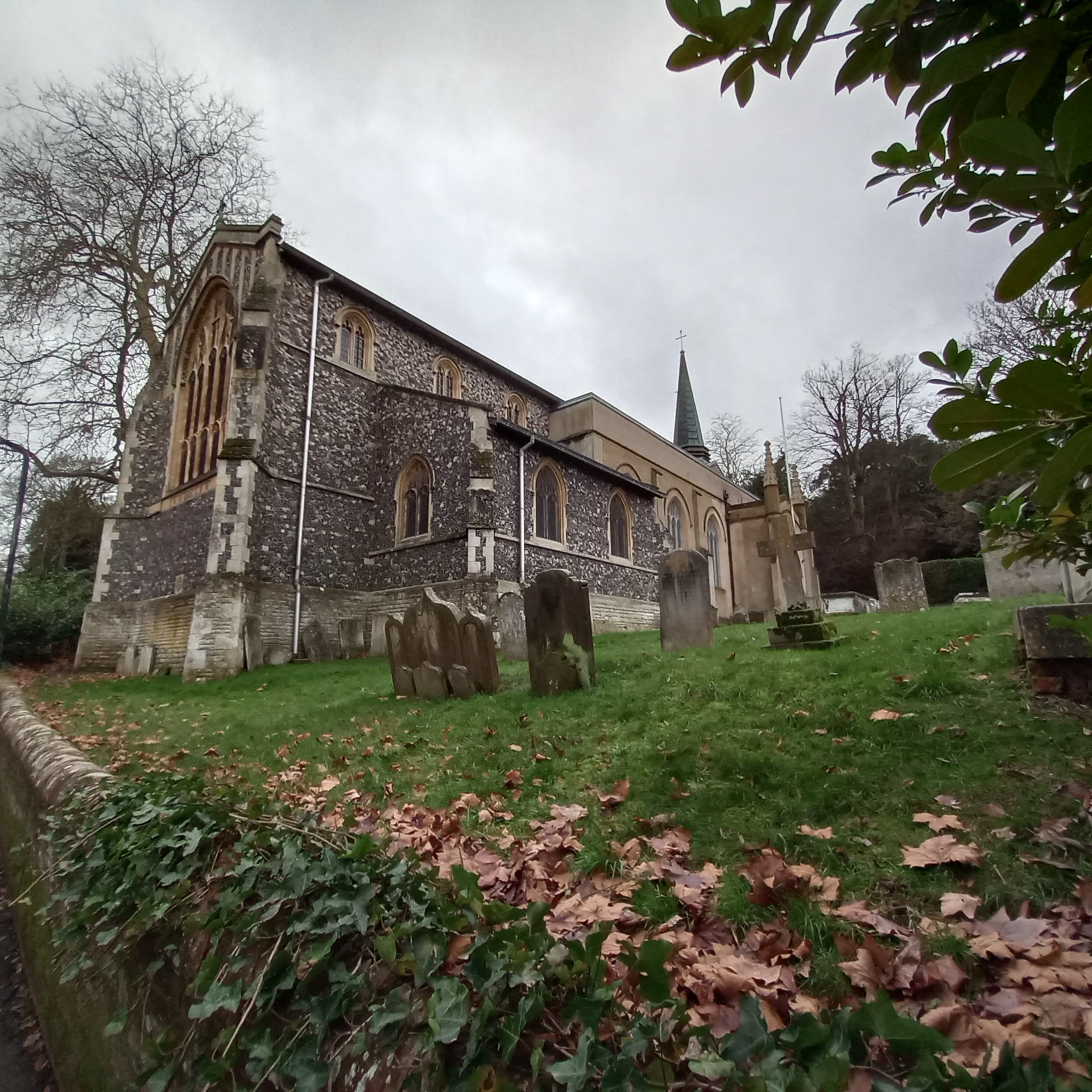
View from the northeast.

The main part of the church building is a wide nave without aisles, in the Neo-Early English Gothic style, but with Perpendicular Gothic window tracery. There is a wooden gallery at the west end, supported on slim iron columns. The large chancel to the east, which is taller than the nave, is in the Perpendicular style. It is flanked by a chapel on the north side and to the south, by a shallow chamber for the pipe organ. There is a north porch and a modern parish room to the south. At the west end is a square bell tower, surmounted by a copper-covered octagonal spire which is louvred at the base; the distinctive design of which was described by Nikolaus Pevsner as "funny". The exterior of the nave is cement render, while the chancel and north chapel are faced with knapped flint on a freestone plinth. The east stained glass window is by Heaton, Butler and Bayne and two others are by Charles Eamer Kempe. An elaborate wall monument to Richard Hewitt who died in 1771 is attributed to Richard Hayward.

== History ==
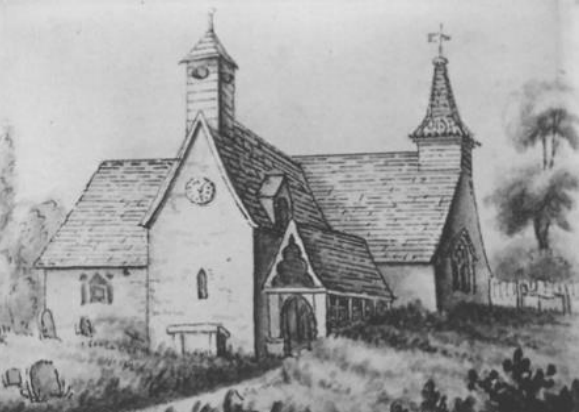
Old St Leonard's Church, before its demolition in 1820.

The first record of a church at Lexden was when Eudo Dapifer, the Castellan of Colchester Castle who died in 1120, gave a part of the tithes (a local tax to support the parish church) to St John's Abbey. In 1254, the advowson, the right to appoint a parish priest, was held by John de Burgh, the lord of the manor of Lexden; this right continued with the manor through the FitzWalter, Lucas, Rawstorn, and Papillon families, until 1978. The names of the Rectors of Lexden are recorded since 1291. The rector's income from the parish was the richest in the Liberty of Colchester, valued at 40 shillings (£2) in 1254.

The turbulent times following the Reformation in England affected St Leonards; in 1574, the rector resigned after being accused of failing to preach regular sermons and in 1586, Robert Searle was threatened with removal for Nonconformist practices. In contrast, his successor, Stephen Nettles, wrote tracts against the Puritans and continued to use the Book of Common Prayer, leading to him being deprived of his income in 1644, although he refused to yield the rectory until he was forced out in 1647; the imposed Puritan rector was harassed by angry parishioners and finally left in 1650 to be replaced by another member of the Nettles family. In June 1648, the Siege of Colchester began; Thomas Fairfax, commander of the Roundhead besiegers encamped on Lexden Heath, parked his artillery on the high ground behind the church.

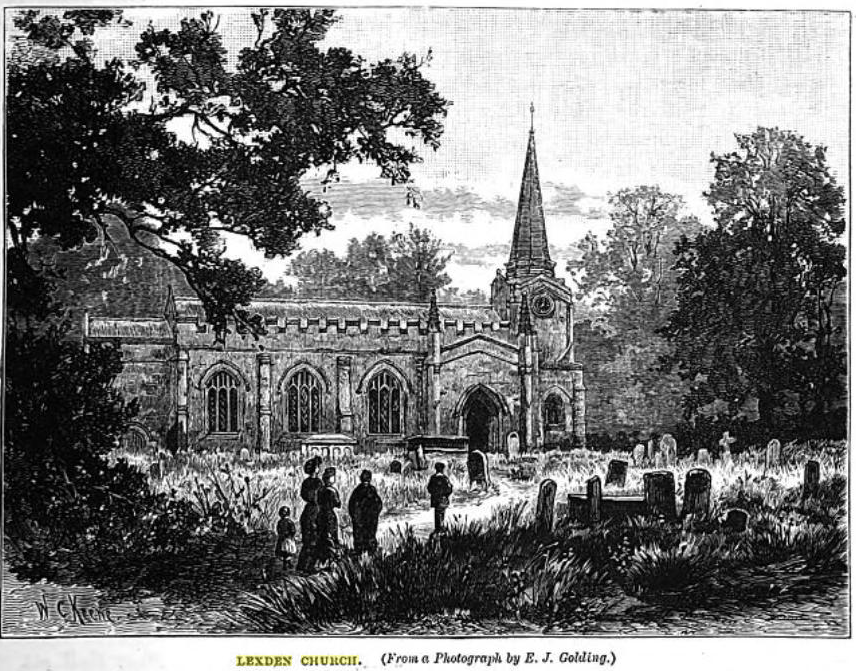
St Leonard's in 1878, showing the small chancel (left) before its replacement in the 1890s.

The fabric of the medieval building was already described as "decayed" in 1607. A wooden clock tower was added on the north chapel in 1748. By the start of the 19th century, the church building was in a very decrepit state and was furthermore, too small for the number of parishioners as the area had begun to change from an agricultural village to a suburb of Colchester. Between 1820 and 1821, a new building was constructed in the Gothic Revival style, a little to the south of the old church which was demolished. The project was led by the rector, George Preston, and funded by local subscriptions of £900 together with a £500 grant from the Society for Promoting the Enlargement, Building, and Repairing of Churches and Chapels. The design was by Mark Greystone Thompson of Dedham, a carpenter-turned-architect who was responsible for a number of churches and rectories in Essex and East Anglia, including St Nicholas' Church in Harwich. The layout of the building reflected the liturgical practices of the time, which favoured preaching over ceremony, so the chancel was rather small and shallow. The new church was described by the antiquarian Thomas Wright in 1836:

"...a very handsome specimen of modern Gothic architecture, with a tower and spire leaded; the interior is extremely neat, having a convenient chancel, and at the west end a gallery for the singers..."

In 1845 a new parish of All Saints' Stanway (now All Saints' Shrub End) was formed from part of the west of Lexden parish. In 1869, a chapel of ease dedicated to Saint Paul was opened in the north of Lexden parish to cater for the growing population around Colchester railway station, and in 1879, it was also made a separate parish.

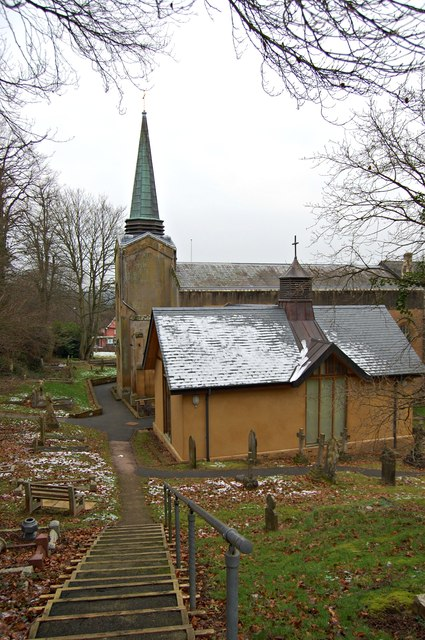
The 2008 parish room, viewed from the garden of rest.

Towards the end of the 19th century, the style of worship in Anglican churches had changed and the need for a larger chancel was apparent. In 1892–94, a spacious new chancel and north chapel were built, designed by John Charles Traylen (1845–1907) of Stamford, Lincolnshire. A projected south chapel was never completed. Much of the elaborately carved woodwork in the church is the work of the rector at that time, John Henry Lester (1845–1900), who also wrote a number of hymns. In 1901, a large pipe organ was installed by Norman and Beard.

During the First World War, St Leonard's was one of five Colchester churches which were asked to provide regular church parade services for the huge number of soldiers stationed in Colchester Garrison, as the military chaplains based there had been overwhelmed.

The churchyard was closed to burials in 1946, but a garden of rest, featuring a columbarium for 300 urns and an altar, to the design of Bailey and Walker was opened in 1950. In 2008, a new parish room was added, designed by Bakers of Danbury, replacing the original south porch and vestry.

== Present day ==
The main Sunday service is a Sung Parish Eucharist with a full choir, or an All-Age Eucharist. Weekday Eucharists are held each Wednesday and Thursday. 8am BCP Holy Communion is celebrated two Sundays a month, and Evensong and a Healing Eucharist once a month. The church runs a number of courses and support groups. For young people, there is a junior church during services, a regular Messy Church for primary school aged children, a youth group, a baby and toddler group, and a Lego-based, "brick club". An affiliated Scout Group meets in the church hall. In 2023, St Leonard's had 206 members on the electoral roll, 57% of whom were residents of the parish. The current Priest-in-Charge is the Reverend Matthew Simpkins.

=== Sources ===
- Beaken, Robert (2015). The Church of England and the Home Front, 1914-1918. Woodbridge, Suffolk: Boydell Press. ISBN 978-1783270514.
- Pevsner, Nikolaus; Radcliffe, Enid (1965). The Buildings of England: Essex. London: Penguin Books. ISBN 0140710116.
- Round, John Horace (1882). The History and Antiquities of Colchester Castle. Colchester: Benham & Co.
- Saur, Klaus Gerhard, ed. (1991). British Biographical Archive: Series 2, Volume 7. Munich: K. G. Saur Verlag. p. 2884. ISBN 978-3598336300.
- Wright, Thomas (1836). The history and topography of the County of Essex, Volume I. London: George Virtue.
