= Edward Garnier (cricketer) =

English cricketer

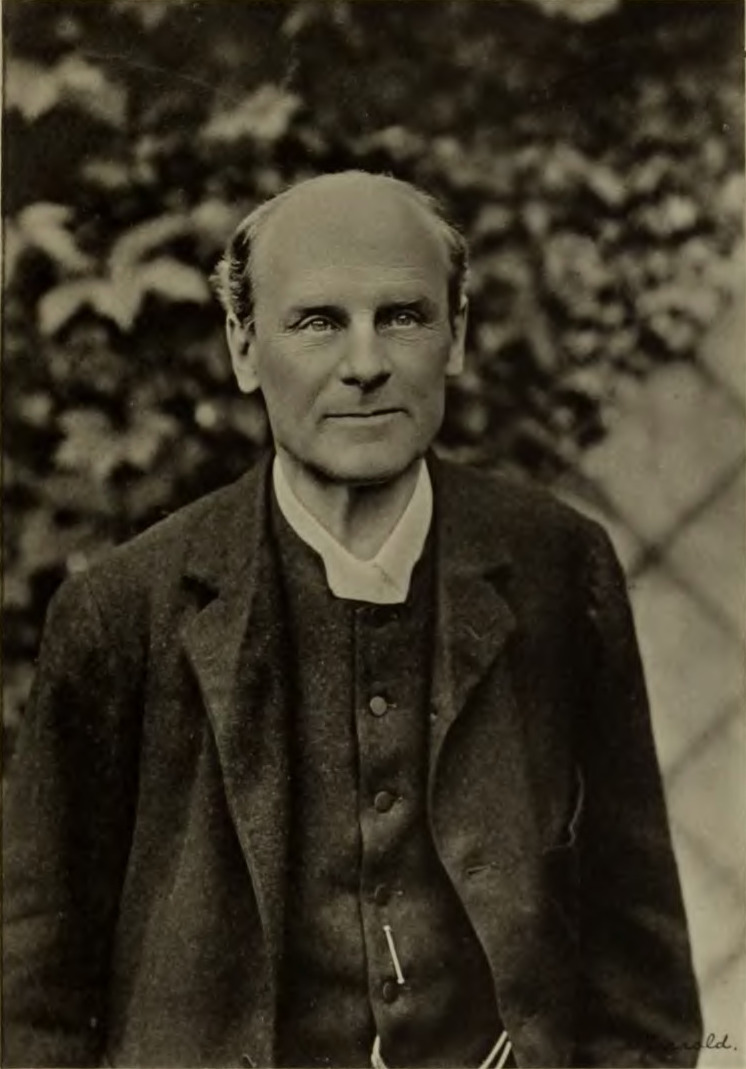

Personal information
- Full name: Edward Southwell Garnier
- Born: 5 April 1850; Paddington, London, England
- Died: 8 August 1938 (aged 88); Shropham, Norfolk, England
- Batting: Right-handed
- Bowling: Right-arm roundarm medium
- Relatives: Thomas Garnier senior (father); Thomas Garnier junior (brother); John Garnier (uncle); George Tottenham (nephew)

Domestic team information
- Years: Team
- 1871–1873: Oxford University

Career statistics
Competition	First-class
Matches	10
Runs scored	187
Batting average	11.68
100s/50s	–/1
Top score	66*
Balls bowled	136
Wickets	0
Bowling average	–
5 wickets in innings	–
10 wickets in match	–
Best bowling	–
Catches/stumpings	3/–
- Source: Cricinfo, 9 March 2020

Edward Southwell Garnier (5 April 1850 – 8 August 1938) was an English first-class cricketer and clergyman.

== Early life and background ==
Garnier was born in April 1850 at Paddington, the son of Thomas Garnier (1809-1863) and Lady Caroline Keppel (1814-1898). His father was Dean of Lincoln, and his mother was the youngest daughter of William Keppel, 4th Earl of Albemarle.

His brother Thomas was also a first-class cricketer.

== Education and sports career ==
He was educated at Marlborough College, before matriculating at University College, Oxford in 1869, graduating B.A. in 1873 and M.A. in 1876. While studying at Oxford, he played first-class cricket for Oxford University, making his debut against the Marylebone Cricket Club at Oxford in 1871. He played first-class cricket for Oxford until 1873, making ten appearances. He scored a total of 187 runs in his ten matches, at an average of 11.68 and a high score of 66 not out.

He also played below first-class at county level for Bedfordshire and, on one occasion in 1871, for Shropshire while playing at club level for Ludlow.

Garnier became the British 120 yards hurdles champion after winning the AAC Championships title at the 1871 AAC Championships.

== Career outside sport ==
After graduating from Oxford, Garnier took holy orders in the Church of England, training at Wells Theological College. He was ordained deacon in 1874 and priest in 1875 by the Bishop of Ely. After serving as curate at Aspley Guise (1874–77) and Biggleswade (1877-78), his first ecclesiastical posting was as rector of Titsey, Surrey from 1878–83, before becoming the rector of Quidenham, Norfolk, where he served until retiring in 1926, also being Rural Dean of North and South Rockland in 1914. He was an honorary canon of Norwich Cathedral from 1922.

Garnier died in Norfolk at Shropham in August 1938.
