= List of King George V Playing Fields in Essex =

King George V Playing Fields were established in memory of King George V, who died in 1936.

Essex
Location	Formal name	Local name (if any)	National Grid Reference	Dates		External links
Location	Formal name	Local name (if any)	National Grid Reference	Purchase	Opening	External links
Brentwood	King George V Playing Field	Hartswood Park	TQ606925			The Paddling Pool, King Georges Playing Fields, Brentwood
Canvey Island	King George V Playing Field		TQ803831			
Heybridge	King George V Playing Field		TL859082			Maldon District Council: Heybridge
Lexden	King George Playing Field	Clairmont Road	Tl962243			King George Playing Field
Rayleigh	King George Playing Field	n/a	TQ808906			About Rayleigh
Southminster	King George V Memorial Field	n/a	TQ960995			Maldon District Council: Southminster
Wivenhoe	King George V Playing Field	Recreation Ground	TM037218	1938		History and pictures of Wivenhoe's field
Grays Thurrock	King George V Memorial Playing Field, Blackshots Lane					
Tilbury	King George's Field	The Daisy Field	TQ644767			
