= St Paul's Church, Leicester =

St Paul’s Church, Leicester
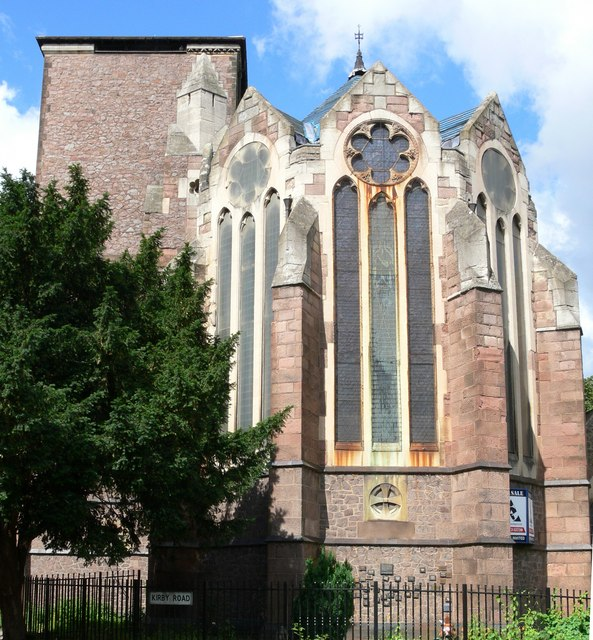
- St Paul’s Church, Leicester
- St Paul’s Church, Leicester
- 52°38′3.9″N 1°9′12.91″W
- OS grid reference: SK 57402 04422
- Location: Leicester
- Country: England
- Denomination: Church of England

History
- Status: Redundant
- Dedication: St Paul
- Consecrated: 1 November 1871

Architecture
- Heritage designation: Grade II listed
- Architect: Frederick Webster Ordish
- Groundbreaking: 18 May 1870
- Completed: 1871
- Closed: 2003

Specifications
- Capacity: 800 to 900 persons
- Length: 142 feet (43 m)
- Width: 65 feet (20 m)
- Height: 62 feet (19 m)

Administration
- Diocese: Diocese of Leicester

St Paul's Church, Leicester is a Grade II listed former parish church in the Church of England in Kirby Road, Leicester, Leicestershire.

== History ==
The foundation stone was laid on 18 May 1870. The church was built to the designs of Frederick Webster Ordish and John Charles Traylen of Mountsorrel granite, banded and interlaid with Derbyshire red gritstone, covered with Swithland grey-green slating. Stone from Box and the Forest of Dean was used in the quatrefoils of the clerestory, and the side and end windows. The windows were fitted with mosaic glass by Evans of Birmingham.

It was consecrated on 1 November 1871.

== Incumbents ==
- James Mason 1871 - 1911
- C.E. Jenkins 1911 - 1928 (afterwards vicar of the Church of the Resurrection, Brussels)
- L.R.L. Donaldson 1928 - 1933 (afterwards vicar of St Mary’s Church, Ketton)
- Edmund Keith Blundell 1933 - 1938 (formerly vicar of Grahamstown, South Africa, afterwards rector of St Aidan’s Church, Johannesburg)
- J.R. Quarterman 1938 - 1965 (formerly vicar of St Matthew's Church, Leicester)
- Alfred G. Burford 1965 - 1974 (afterwards vicar of Long Clawson with Hose)
- Gordon Sealy 1975 - 1996

== Organ ==
The organ dates from 1873 and was by Brindley & Foster. A specification of the organ can be found on the National Pipe Organ Register. When the church was declared redundant, the organ was moved to the Church of the Assumption of St Mary the Virgin, Hinckley, Leicestershire.

== Parish status ==
The church was declared redundant in 2003 and the parish moved to a modern worship centre.
