= Richard Tottenham (civil servant) =

Irish cricketer and civil servant

Personal information
- Full name: George Richard Frederick Tottenham
- Born: 18 November 1890; Inagh, Ireland
- Died: 11 January 1977 (aged 86); Totland, Isle of Wight, England
- Batting: Unknown
- Bowling: Unknown
- Relatives: Godfrey Papillon (cousin); Thomas Garnier (uncle); Edward Garnier (uncle)

Domestic team information
- Years: Team
- 1915/16: Europeans

Career statistics
Competition	First-class
Matches	1
Runs scored	21
Batting average	21.00
100s/50s	–/–
Top score	21
Balls bowled	126
Wickets	3
Bowling average	20.00
5 wickets in innings	–
10 wickets in match	–
Best bowling	2/42
Catches/stumpings	1/–
- Source: Cricinfo, 29 November 2018

Sir George Richard Frederick Tottenham KCIE CSI (18 November 1890 – 11 January 1977) was an Irish-born civil servant in India and a first-class cricketer.

The son of Frederick St. Leger Tottenham (who was the High Sheriff of Clare in 1899) and his wife Mabel Caroline Garnier, Tottenham was born at Mount Callan near Inagh, County Clare in November 1890. He was educated in England at Harrow School, before going up to New College, Oxford. After graduating from New College, Tottenham began working for the Indian Civil Service in British India, taking up a post there in 1914. The following year, he made an appearance in first-class cricket for the Europeans against the Indians at Madras. Batting once in the match, he scored 21 runs in the Europeans first-innings, before being dismissed by T. Vasu. With the ball, he took one wicket in the Indians first-innings and two in their second-innings. He married Hazel Joyce Gwynne in 1917.

Tottenham continued to serve in the British civil service in India following Irish independence, and was awarded a Knighthood by George V in May 1930. He was made a companion to the Order of the Indian Empire in the 1936 New Year Honours, and was made a Knight Bachelor in May 1937. He continued to serve in the Indian Civil Service on special duty following Indian Independence in 1947. He spent his final years living in Totland on the Isle of Wight, where he died in January 1977.
