= William Kaye Legge =

Brigadier-General William Kaye Legge CMG DSO
- Born: 13 June 1869
- Died: 29 March 1946 (aged 76); Hastings
- Military career
- Allegiance: United Kingdom
- Branch: British Army
- Service years: 1889–1926
- Rank: Brigadier-General
- Unit: Essex Regiment
- Conflicts: Second Boer War, First World War
- Awards: CMG, DSO

Brigadier-General William Kaye Legge CMG DSO (13 June 1869 – 29 March 1946) was a senior British Army officer during the First World War.

== Biography ==
A grandson of William Legge, 4th Earl of Dartmouth, William Kaye Legge was son of Charles Gounter Legge and Mary Garnier, daughter of Thomas Garnier. He was born on 13 June 1869, and educated at Bedford School between 1881 and 1887. He received his first commission as a second lieutenant in the Essex Regiment on 30 January 1889, and was promoted to lieutenant on 6 July 1891. He served during the Second Boer War, between 1899 and 1902, and was promoted to captain on 29 January 1900.

Legge served during the First World War, between 1914 and 1918, and on 30 October 1916 was appointed as a deputy adjutant and quartermaster general (DA&QMG), receiving a temporary promotion to brigadier general whilst employed in this role.

He was Commander of the 163rd Infantry Brigade, between 1924 and 1926.

Brigadier General William Kaye Legge was invested as a Companion of the Distinguished Service Order in 1917, and as a Commander of the Order of St Michael and St George in 1918. He retired from the British Army in 1926, and died in Hastings on 29 March 1946.
