= St Paul's Church, Stamford =

Church building in Stamford, Lincolnshire, England

Coordinates: 52°39.2431′N 0°28.4702′W

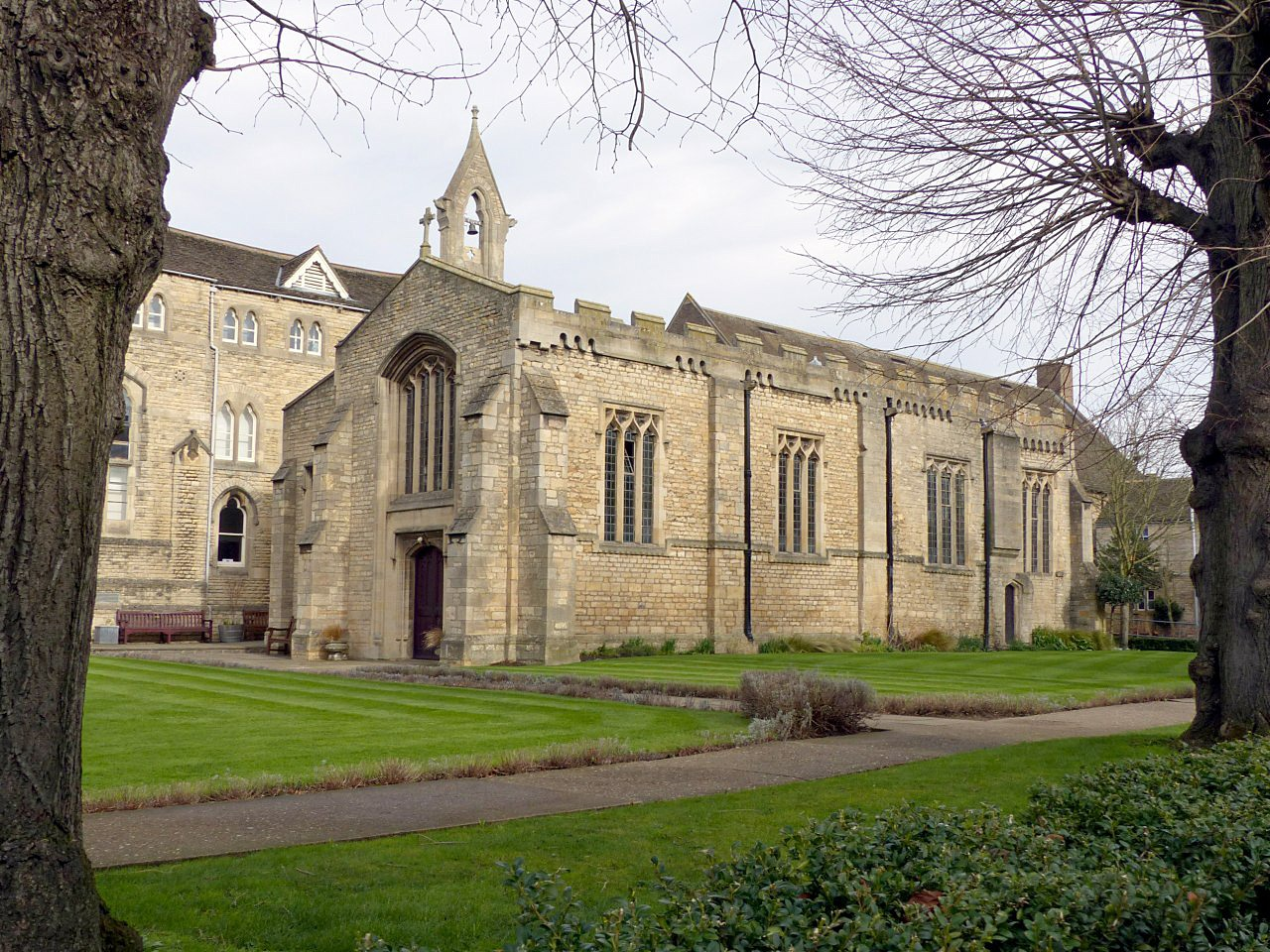
St Paul's, now the Stamford School chapel, from the southwest

The Church of St Paul in Stamford, Lincolnshire, England, was one of the town's fourteen Medieval parish churches until its deconsecration and extensive demolition during the Reformation when the remaining part became used as the schoolroom of Stamford School. It was then restored and extended in 1929-30 for use as the school chapel in commemoration of those old boys and staff who had died in the First World War. The medieval remains were the eastern part of the south aisle and adjacent fragments of the nave of the church.

== History as a church ==
The parish church dedicated to St Paul lay just within the town walls in the north-eastern corner of the medieval town and contains some of the earliest fabric of all Stamford churches having been built no later than 1152. It was in the patronage of the Priory of Saint-Fromond in Normandy in the mid eleventh century but had come into the hands of lay patrons by 1413.

Of what remains, the two east bays of the south wall are first half of the twelfth century and although the proportions suggest the church was large, with a nave of four or five bays, the plan of the church at that time is unknown; it may have been rectangular without a chancel. "Externally the arched corbel table, the flat east buttress, and the frieze at sill level of the windows show this south wall at once to be Norman." The walls are of Barnack stone, coursed rubble with ashlar dressings and incorporate miniature arches and rounded corbels, supporting a later battlemented parapet. Reset between the bays is a (sealed) fifteenth-century doorway. The two east-most windows in the south wall are early fourteenth century and those in the east wall, which is c. 1200, are late fifteenth century. The north aisle, comprising two medieval (the east-most) and two modern arches, has stiff-leaf decoration on the capitals of the former. St Paul's had a tower and belfry and there was a room over the church door. Inside, there is a fourteenth-century doorway to a former rood loft stair.

In the south east corner where the altar stood (and stands) are three piscina recesses presumably credences with carved chamfered ogee heads of the fourteenth century. The remains (the lower halves) "of two good C14 figures” thought to be of St John and the Virgin Mary found during excavations in the early twentieth century were placed high up on the south wall.

There are two tomb recesses in the south wall, one finely-moulded, probably of c.1300. In one is a large, stone coffin lid with carved inscription in medieval French which commemorates Henry de Elyngton, Rector of St Paul's between 1384 and 1400, (although this stone has suffered from some physical deterioration in recent years), and in the other a miniature, thirteenth-century coffin lid, presumably that of a child. Over the interior of the west door is an arched inscription commemorating Eustace Malherbe (Eustachius Malerbe), Member of Parliament for Stamford in 1322, and also a male, bearded, stone head, believed to be of Christ.

Attached to the church was originally the cell of an anchorite, mentioned in 1382, 1435 and 1521, wherein a female hermit was walled up effectively for the duration of her life.

The main part of the present building was originally a chapel dedicated to St Katherine and the guild of St Katherine (refounded in 1480 by Alderman William Browne, founder of Browne's Hospital) met for its services in the chapel. The guild was a wealthy one and its members included Lady Margaret Beaufort, Princess Cecily of York and David Cecil, grandfather of William Cecil, 1st Baron Burghley and Alderman William Radcliffe, founder of Stamford School. After the Reformation, parts of its property came into the hands of the Cecil family in 1549.

St Paul's was one of the more modest livings in Stamford which may have contributed to the decision to close it. It may also have suffered at the hands of Lancastrian army which sacked Stamford in 1461. Following an Act of Parliament of 1548 permitting amalgamation of Stamford's parishes, St Paul's was amalgamated with St George's and the church, now redundant, was largely demolished, its fixtures and fittings sold.

== Post-Reformation use ==
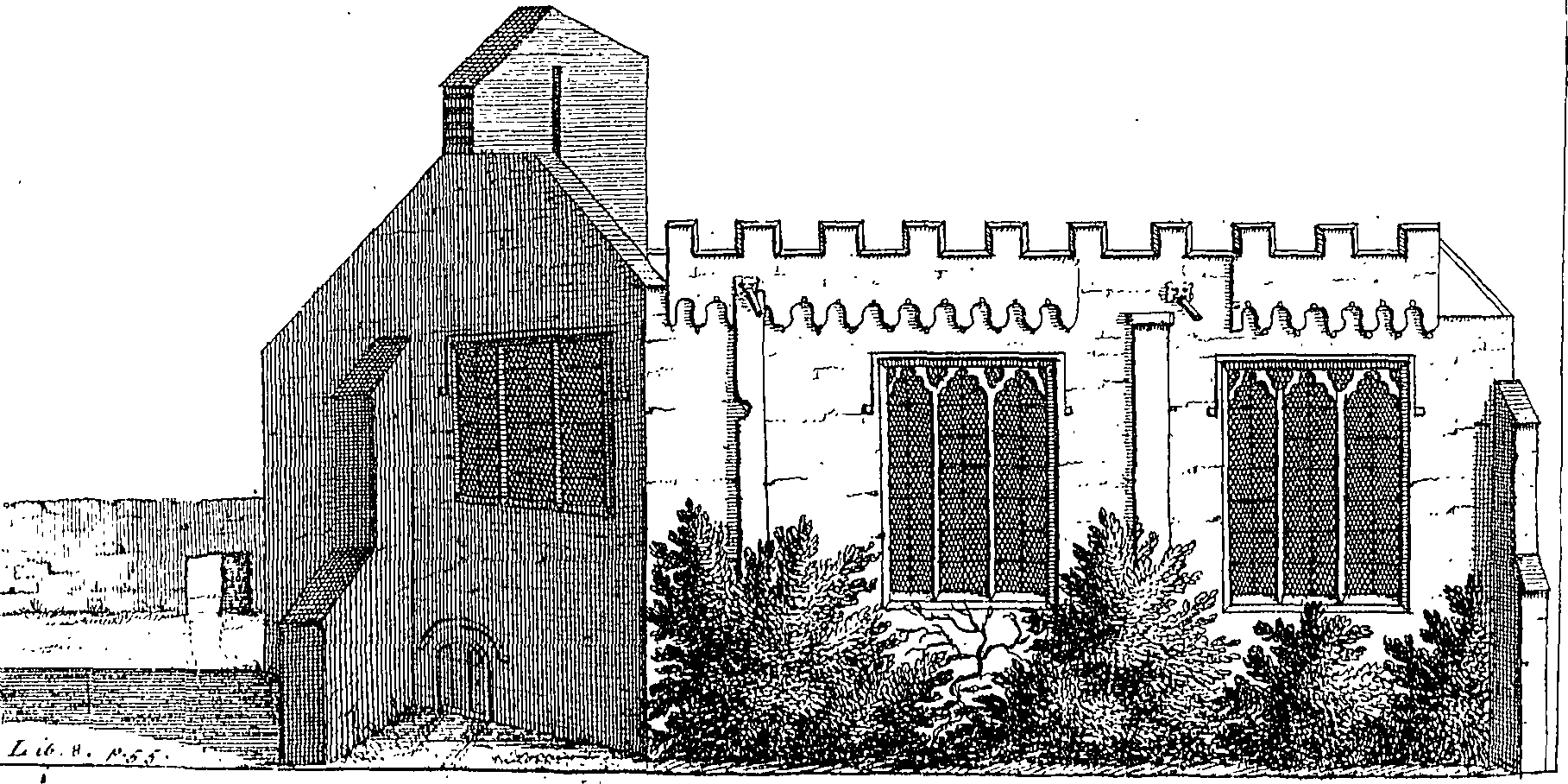
The church in Francis Peck's Academia tertia Anglicana; or, the antiquarian annals of Stanford [sic] in Lincoln, Rutland, and Northampton shires (1727)

Amid the upheavals of the Reformation, Stamford School, founded in 1532, left its original home in the Corpus Christi chapel of Stamford's St Mary's church and moved into the remaining section of St Paul's church on the north side of St Paul's Street. The move occurred perhaps as early as 1548 when the school's future was secured by Act of Parliament arranged by senior court official and old boy, William Cecil, and had certainly been completed by 1556.

From the mid-sixteenth century the surviving part of St Paul's – essentially the south aisle of the medieval church and part of the nave consisting of two bays - served as a school room until 1929. A second school room was added on the north side of the building in 1833. A marble memorial tablet was erected around 1902 on the north wall to two former pupils who fell in the Second Boer War.

== Modern restoration ==
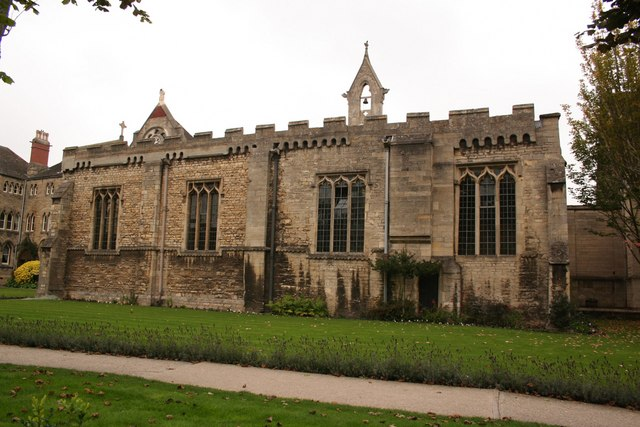
Stamford School chapel

Over 1929-30 the building was extended westwards to its original length of four bays and restored to ecclesiastical use as the chapel of Stamford School in memorial to those of the School community who had died in the First World War. The work was overseen by architects Traylen and Lenton of Stamford.

The foundation stone, an ancient carved stone head known as "the Old Man" (the subject of generations of schoolboy tradition) which formed the keystone above the west door of the school room, was laid on 17 October 1929 by Lady Burghley. The work was completed in 1930 and now comprises a rectangular building with a combined nave and sanctuary and north aisle. (What is now the nave of the chapel originally constituted the south aisle of St Paul's church, while the north aisle of today's chapel was originally part of the medieval nave). Extensive oak panelling by Bowmans of Stamford covers the interior walls and the altar table, cross, candlesticks and riddel posts (also by Bowmans) present as Low Church Anglican. The chapel was re-consecrated by the Bishop of Lincoln, William Swayne on 21 June 1930.

The names of staff and old boys who fell in the First World War are carved either side of the altar, and after the Second World War the names of those who died, together with details of rank, regiment and circumstances of death, were added to oak panels around the walls. The benches are carved with names of those who made substantial contributions to the original rebuilding fund or, subsequently, to the life of the chapel over the twentieth century.

Since 22 May 1954 the Chapel has been a Grade II listed building.

In 1961, a nineteenth-century Gray and Davison pipe organ was installed although this was removed in the 1990s and replaced with an electronic substitute.
