= Hyde Abbey School =

Independent school in Winchester, Hampshire, England

Coordinates: 51.067621°N 1.315149°W

Hyde Abbey School was a British independent school in Winchester, Hampshire, England.

The school was founded by the Reverend Reynell Cotton in 1760. Following his death in 1779, Cotton was succeeded as headmaster by his son-in-law, the Reverend Charles Richards.

In 1795, Sir John Soane constructed a dedicated schoolroom for the school – his only building in Winchester. By 1847, the school had closed and its building was taken on a lease as the first Hampshire Museum.

== Alumni ==
Alumni include:

- Edmund Lyons, 1st Baron Lyons, Commander of the Royal Navy during the Crimean War
- Henry John Chitty Harper, former Primate of New Zealand
- Thomas Garnier, former Dean of Winchester
- George Canning, former Prime Minister of the United Kingdom
- Henry Sewell, first Prime Minister of New Zealand
- Thomas Gaisford, former Dean of Christ Church
- Charles Wolfe, the Irish poet
- General Sir George Augustus Wetherall
- George Moberly, former Bishop of Salisbury and Headmaster of Winchester College
- Thomas Townsend, former Bishop of Meath
- William Piercy Austin, former Bishop of Guyana
- Sir Anthony Oliphant, former Chief Justice of Ceylon.
