= John Charles Traylen =

English architect

John Charles Traylen A.R.I.B.A.
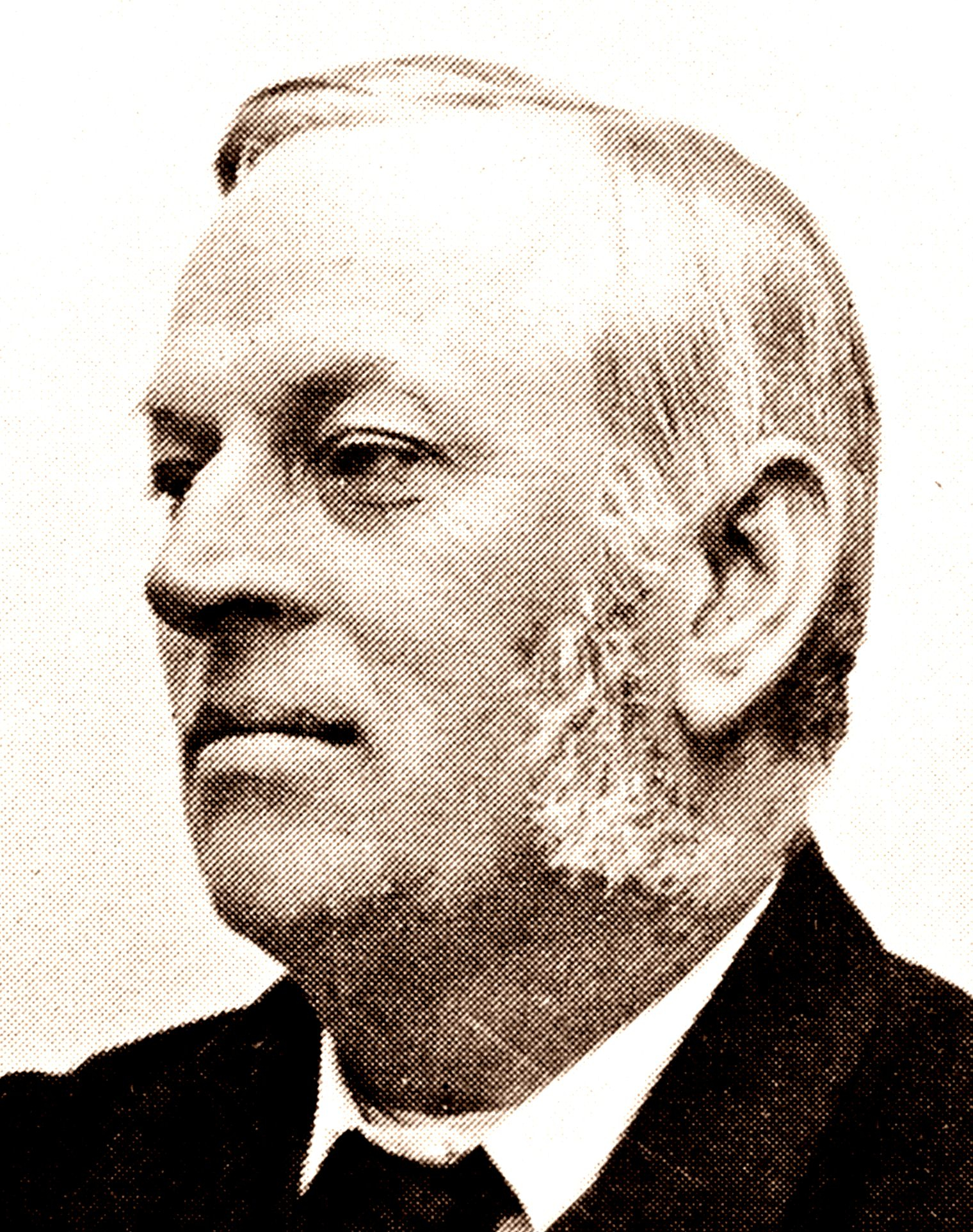
- Born: 27 February 1845; Sibson, Huntingdonshire
- Died: 11 June 1907 (aged 62); Stamford, Lincolnshire
- Resting place: St John the Baptist Church, Stibbington, Cambridgeshire
- Education: Royal Academy Schools
- Occupations: architect; surveyor; architectural reconstruction
- Children: Henry Francis Traylen, F.R.I.B.A.
- Buildings: Stamford School of Art 1895

John Charles Traylen ARIBA (27 February 1845 - 11 June 1907) was an English architect.

== Personal life ==
Traylen was born at Sibson in Huntingdonshire, and educated at Oundle School and Northampton Grammar School. He was admitted a student of the Royal Academy of British Architects. He died at his home in Broad Street, Stamford on 11 June 1907.

== Career ==
Traylen became an articled pupil of William Millican of Leicester from 1858 to 1863. He then became an assistant to John Johnson in London whom he assisted in designing Alexandra Palace. He then moved to be an assistant of Frederick Webster Ordish and later became his partner. Together they produced St Paul's Church, Leicester, St Leonard’s Church, Leicester, and several other buildings in the city.

In 1877 Traylen moved to Peterborough and was appointed surveyor for the Archdeaconry of Oakham, which he held until 1894. He was also surveyor to the Archdeaconry of Lincoln. He did restoration work to many churches including St George's Church, Stamford where there is a stained glass window to his memory by Hugh Arnold.

In 1884 Traylen bought the practice of Edward Browning of Broad Street, Stamford and continued working there until his death. His son Henry Francis Traylen joined the practice which became Traylen and Son in 1906 and, in 1921, Traylen and Lenton.

== Awards ==
On 20 March 1882 Traylen was appointed Associate of the Royal Institute of British Architects.

== Works ==
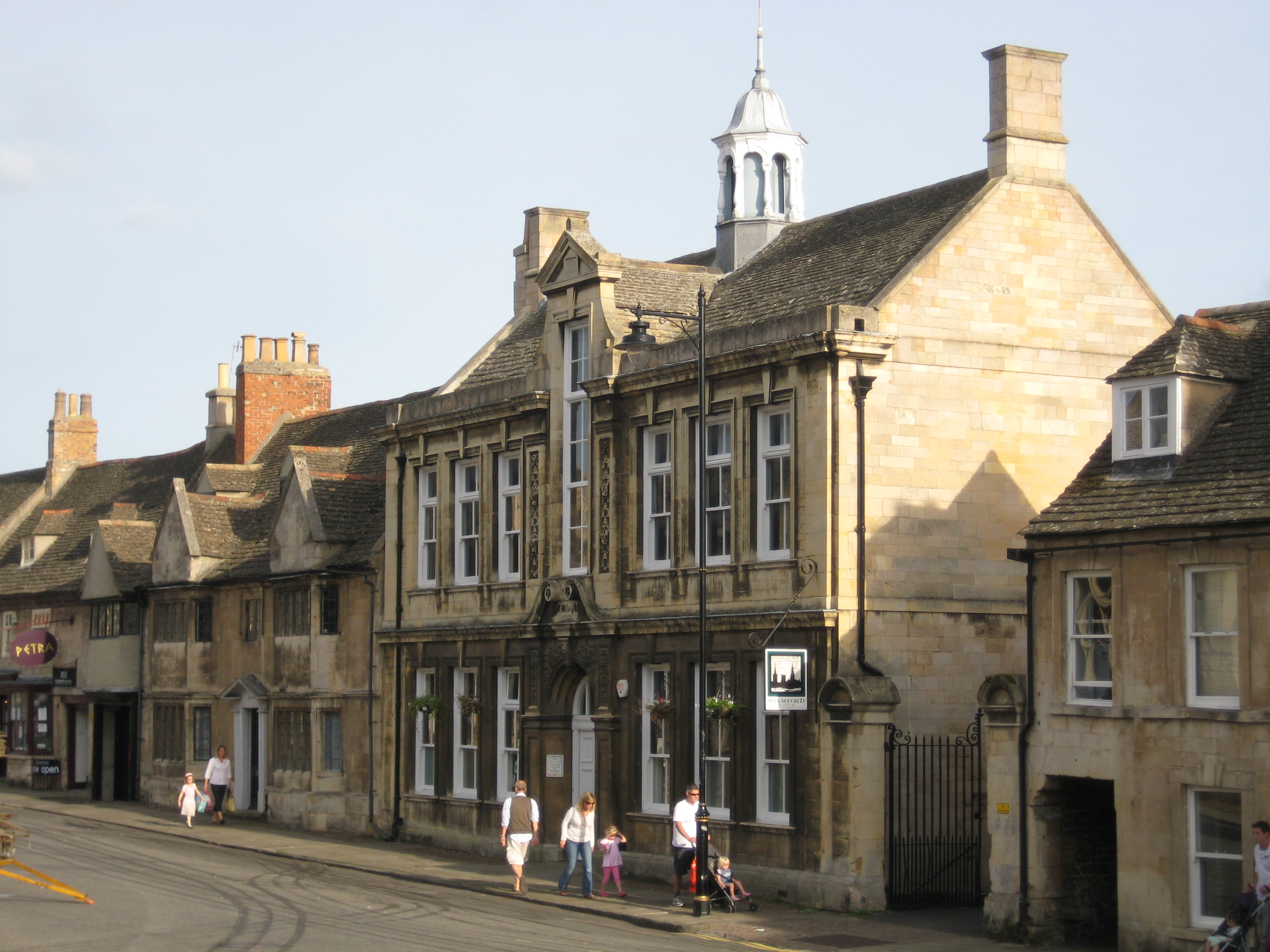
Stamford School of Art, 1895

- St Paul's Church, Leicester 1871
- St John the Baptist Church, Chipping Barnet (flèche and furnishings) 1875
- St Leonard's Church, Lexden (chancel) 1892-94
- Stamford School of Art 1895
