= Lexden Park =

Nature reserve in Colchester, England

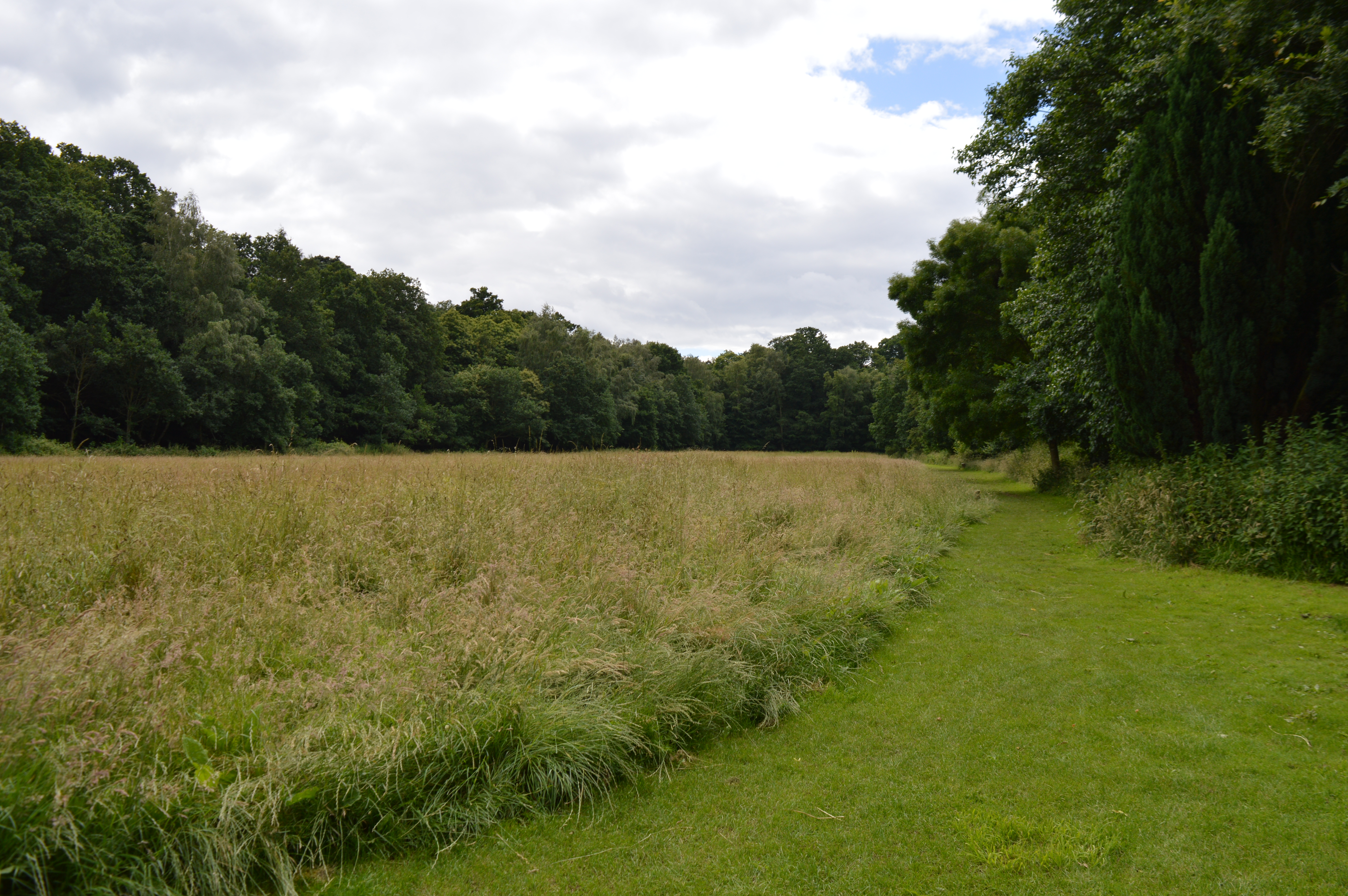
- Interactive map of Lexden Park
- Type: Local Nature Reserve
- Location: Lexden, Colchester, Essex
- OS grid: TL972250
- Coordinates: 51°53′15″N 00°51′54″E
- Area: 8.1 hectares (20 acres)
- Manager: Colchester Borough Council

Lexden Park is an 8.1 hectare Local Nature Reserve in Lexden, a suburb of Colchester in Essex. It is owned and managed by Colchester Borough Council.

The site has grassland with a wide variety of plant species such as lady's bedstraw, lesser stitchwort and greater bird's-foot-trefoil. There is also oak woodland and an ornamental lake with wildfowl.

There is access to the site from Church Lane. It is open to the public apart from the lake and wildlife areas.
