= 1871 AAC Championships =

Outdoor track and field competition

- Dates: 3 April 1871
- Host city: London, England
- Venue: Lillie Bridge Grounds, London
- Level: Senior
- Type: Outdoor

The 1871 AAC Championships was an outdoor track and field competition organised by the Amateur Athletic Club (AAC). The championships were held on 3 April 1871, at the Lillie Bridge Grounds in London.

== Summary ==
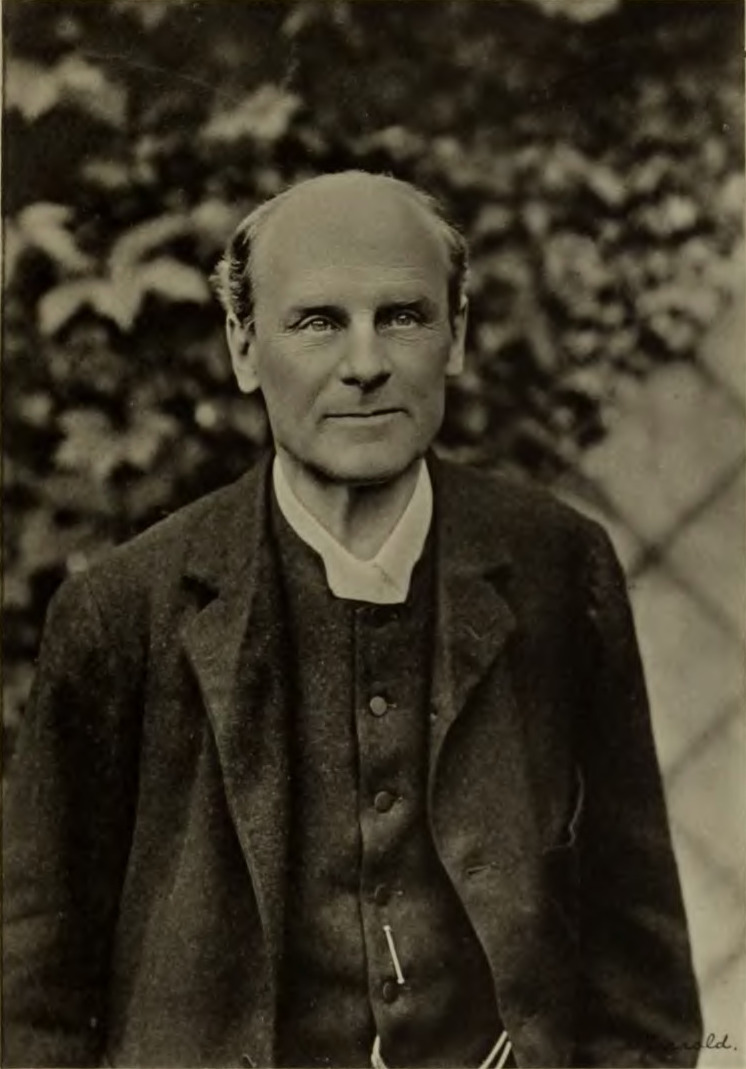
Edward Garnier, hurdles champion

- Robert J. C. Mitchell set a new world record in the high jump, jumping 1.765.
- John Scott set a new world record in the 4 miles, recording 20:38.0.
- Robert J. C. Mitchell won four events for the second consecutive year.

== Results ==
Event	1st			2nd			3rd		
100 yards	John G. Wilson	Worcester C	10.4	E. Jenner Davies	Pembroke C	2 yd	Thomas Hooman	London AC	2 yd
quarter-mile	Abbott R. Upcher	First Trinity	51.8	W. Page	London AC	4 yd	A.S. Henry Dalbiac	RMA, Woolwich	5 yd
half-mile	Hon. Arthur L. Pelham	Third Trinity	2:06.0	Arthur J. C. Dowding	New C	1 ft	only 2 competitors		
1 mile	Walter M. Chinnery	AAC	4:31.8	Thomas Christie	Lincoln C	20 yd	Edward Hawtrey	St John's C	30 yd
4 miles	John Scott	London AC	20:38.0 WR	Alfred Wheeler	L.G.S	22:02.0	Frederick V. Rainsford	London AC	23:37.0
120yd hurdles	Edward Garnier	University C	16.6	William C. Davies	Trinity C	3 yd	Abbott R. Upcher	Trinity C	3 yd
7 miles walk	J. Francis	Peek's CC	58:09	J. E. Bentley	London AC	disq	only 1 finished		
high jump	Robert J. C. Mitchell	Rossendale AC	1.765 WR	John A. Harwood	London AC	1.676	Charles Mason	S. Lincoln AC	1.562
pole jump	Robert J. C. Mitchell	Rossendale AC	3.07	William F. Powell Moore	AAC	2.92	William F. Curteis	Jesus C	2.90
broad jump	E. Jenner Davies; Robert J. C. Mitchell	Pembroke C Rossendale	6.20	n/a			John A. Ornsby	Lincoln C	6.17
shot put	Robert J. C. Mitchell	Rossendale	11.80	Edward J. Bor (Ireland)	RMA, Woolwich	11.42	Henry W. R. Domville	Pembroke C	10.79
hammer throw	William A. Burgess	Queen's C	32.13	Alaric W. Churchward	Pembroke C	31.14	Henry Leeke	Trinity	30.58
