= George Charles Garnier =

English apothecary (1739–1819)

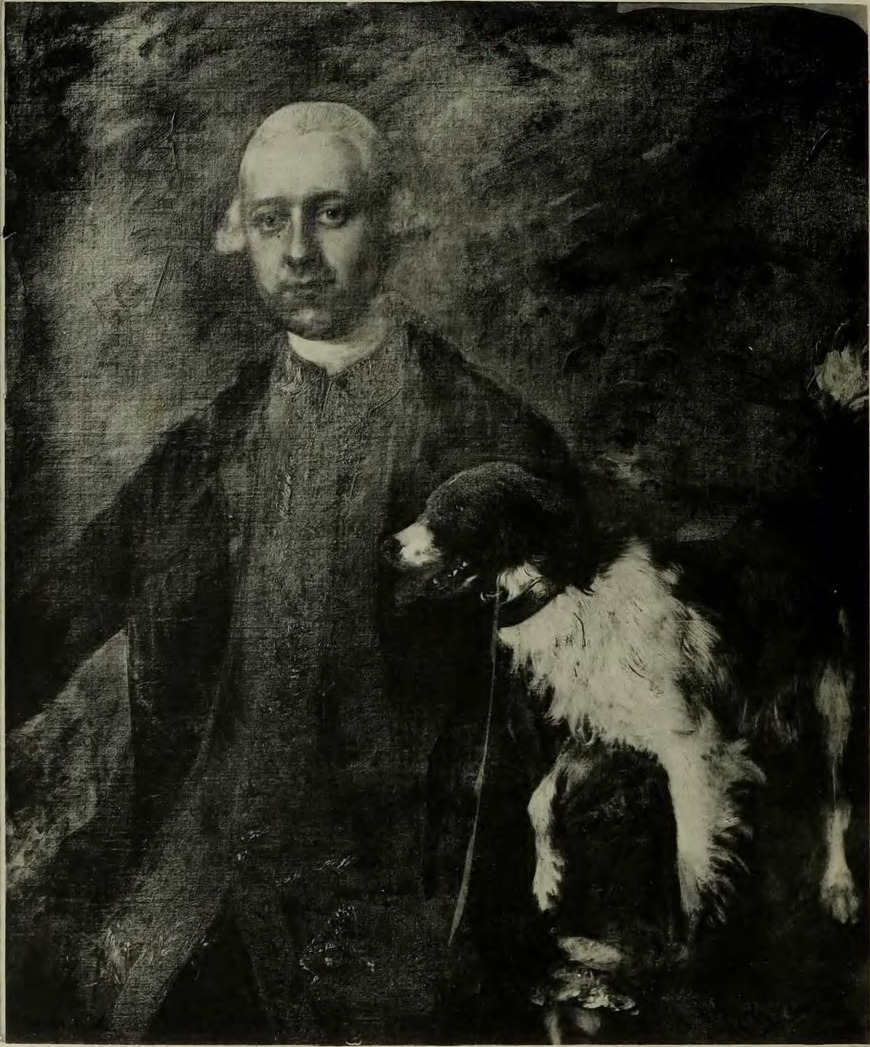
- Garnier with his dog
- Born: 19 October 1739; Westminster, England
- Died: October 1819 (aged 79); Wickham, Hampshire, England
- Education: Eton College
- Occupation: Apothecary
- Office: High Sheriff of Hampshire
- Spouse: Margaret Miller (m. 1766)
- Children: 9, including Thomas

George Charles Garnier (19 October 1739 – October 1819) was an English apothecary who was Apothecary General to the British Army and High Sheriff of Hampshire.

== Biography ==
Garnier was born on 19 October 1739 in Westminster, the son of George Garnier and Frances Hopkins. He was educated at Eton.

Garnier succeeded his father as Apothecary General to the Army. He married Margaret Miller in May 1766; they had six sons and three daughters, including Thomas Garnier the Elder. In 1766, he became High Sheriff of Hampshire.

Garnier died in October 1819 in Wickham, Hampshire, aged 79.
