= Reynell Cotton =

English educator (1717–1779)

The Reverend Reynell Cotton (1717–29 October 1779) was an English educator who was the rector of St Lawrence Church, Winchester and the founder of Hyde Abbey School in the city. He was born in Rudgwick, West Sussex and attended Winchester College. Interested in cricket, Cotton became president of the Hambledon Club in 1773 and 1774; and is well known for the Hambledon Club Song, which he wrote in 1767.
