= Waddingworth =

Hamlet and civil parish in the East Lindsey district of Lincolnshire, England

Coordinates: 53.222470°N 0.219805°W

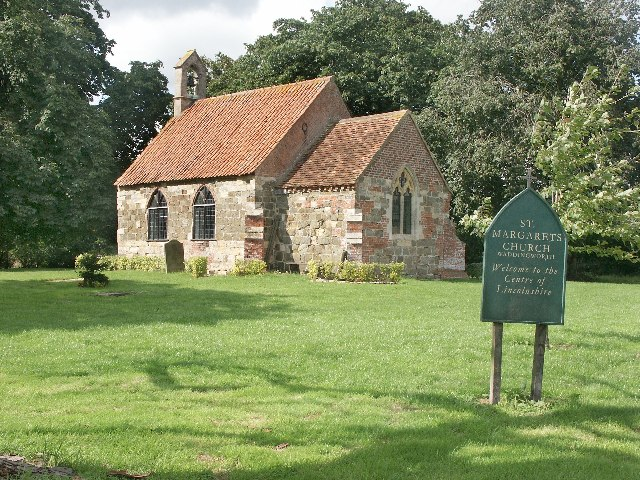
- St Margaret's Church, Waddingworth

- Location within Lincolnshire
- OS grid reference: TF189709
  - London: 120 mi (190 km) S
- District: East Lindsey
- Shire county: Lincolnshire
- Region: East Midlands
- Country: England
- Sovereign state: United Kingdom
- Post town: WOODHALL SPA
- Postcode district: LN10
- Police: Lincolnshire
- Fire: Lincolnshire
- Ambulance: East Midlands
- UK Parliament: Louth and Horncastle (UK Parliament constituency)

Waddingworth is a hamlet and civil parish in the East Lindsey district of Lincolnshire, England, and approximately 5 miles (8 km) north-west from the town of Horncastle. The parish church is almost on the spot that is claimed to be the centre of Lincolnshire.

The name 'Waddingworth' means 'enclosure of the people of Wada'.

At the time of the 1086 Domesday Book, "Waldingurde" or "Wadingurde" consisted of 60 households.

The former parish church and mortuary chapel of Saint Margaret dates to the 13th or 14th century. In 1808 it was recorded as dilapidated and in the same year was rebuilt. It was again reported dilapidated in 1904 and was restored in 1913 by H. F. Traylen. The church was later used as a store and is now disused. It was built of greenstone with brick patching. Built into the stonework over the door is the carved top of a 13th-century grave slab. The interior retains a 13th-century font.
