= John Garnier (cricketer) =

English cricketer and clergyman

Personal information
- Full name: John Garnier
- Born: 26 April 1813; Bishopstoke, Hampshire, England
- Died: 26 March 1838 (aged 24); Oxford, Oxfordshire, England
- Batting: Unknown
- Relatives: Thomas Garnier the Younger (brother); Edward Garnier (nephew); Thomas Garnier (nephew); Godfrey Papillon (great-nephew)

Domestic team information
- Years: Team
- 1832: Oxford University

Career statistics
Competition	First-class
Matches	1
Runs scored	7
Batting average	3.50
100s/50s	–/–
Top score	4
Catches/stumpings	–/–
- Source: Cricinfo, 10 May 2020

John Garnier (26 April 1813 – 26 March 1838) was an English first-class cricketer and clergyman.

The son of The Reverend Thomas Garnier, he was born in April 1813 at Bishopstoke, Hampshire. He was educated at Winchester College, before going up to Exeter College, Oxford. While studying at Oxford, he made a single appearance in first-class cricket for Oxford University against the Marylebone Cricket Club at Oxford in 1832. Batting twice in the match, he was run out for 4 runs in the Oxford first innings, before being dismissed leg before wicket for 3 runs in their second innings. He was elected a fellow of Merton College in 1835.

After graduating from Oxford, Garnier took holy orders in the Church of England. He became the curate at St Ebbe's Church, Oxford in 1837. Garnier died in March of the following year after catching smallpox while visiting his parishioners. Several family members played cricket at first-class level, including his brother Thomas Garnier junior.
