= Frederick Webster Ordish =

English architect

Frederick Webster Ordish FRIBA (1821 – 22 September 1885) was an English architect based in Leicestershire.

== Life ==
He was a pupil of Henry Isaac Stevens.

Initially based in London, he returned in Leicestershire in 1850 and worked in partnership with John Johnson and then from 1870 John Charles Traylen.

He married Isabella Kilby, daughter of John Kilby of Queniborough on 20 December 1854 in Queniborough.

He was elected a Fellow of the Royal Institute of British Architects on 18 December 1865.

He died on 22 September 1885 at Syston railway station when alighting from a train before it had stopped. He fell between the carriages and was decapitated.

== Works ==
- St Paul's Church, Camden Square, London (demolished). With John Johnson, 1847-9.
- City of London Hospital for Diseases of the Chest, Bethnal Green, 1849–55.
- St Luke's Church, Cheltenham, 1853–54.
- Corn Exchange, Leicester. Upper floor and external staircase, 1855, which he later disowned.
- St Mary Magdalen Church, Shearsby. Restoration 1856.
- St Michael's Church, Rearsby. Restoration 1857–58.
- Warehouse and factory of Evans & Stafford, Campbell Street, Leicester (demolished) 1858.
- Humberstone Road Methodist Church, Leicester 1863
- St Paul's Church, Leicester. Ordish & Traylen 1870–71.
- St Peter & St Paul's Church, Syston restorations 1871 and 1881.
- Design for extension of Leicester Museum and School of Art (not built), 1874.
- St Nicholas’ Church, Leicester. North aisle by Ordish & Traylen 1875–76.
- St Leonard's Church, Woodgate, Leicester (demolished). Ordish & Traylen 1876–77.
