= Lexden =

Suburb of Colchester, England

Coordinates: 51.8833°N 0.8667°E

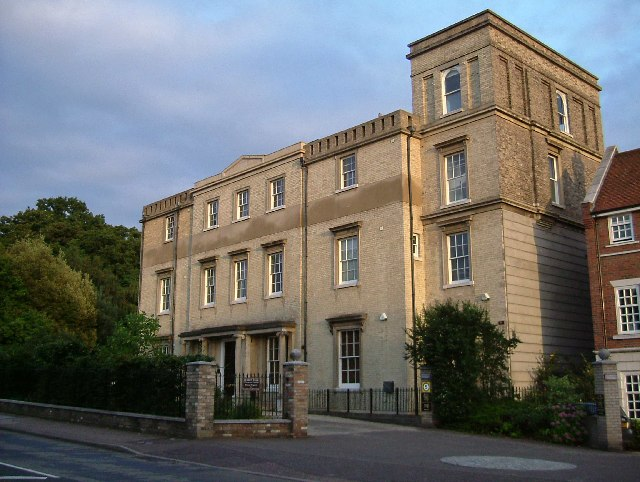
- Lexden Park House

- Location within Essex
- District: Colchester
- Shire county: Essex
- Region: East
- Country: England
- Sovereign state: United Kingdom
- Post town: Colchester
- Postcode district: CO3
- Dialling code: 01206

Lexden is a suburb of Colchester in Essex, England, lying approximately 1 mile (1.6 km) west of the city centre. It has a public house called the Crown. The parish church of St Leonard's (Church of England) is dedicated to Leonard of Noblac, the patron saint of prisoners.

Lexden was historically a separate village and parish. "Læxadyne" is Old English for "Leaxa's valley"; the name has also been previously recorded as Lessendon, Lassendene and Læxadyne. Lexden gave its name to one of the historic hundreds of Essex, referred to as the "Hundred of Lassendene" in the Domesday Book of 1086. The parish was included in the borough boundaries of Colchester from at least the 14th century.

There are two 400-year-old watermills, (both now private residences), a 100-year-old iron bridge over the River Colne, two local nature reserves and several walks.

== History ==
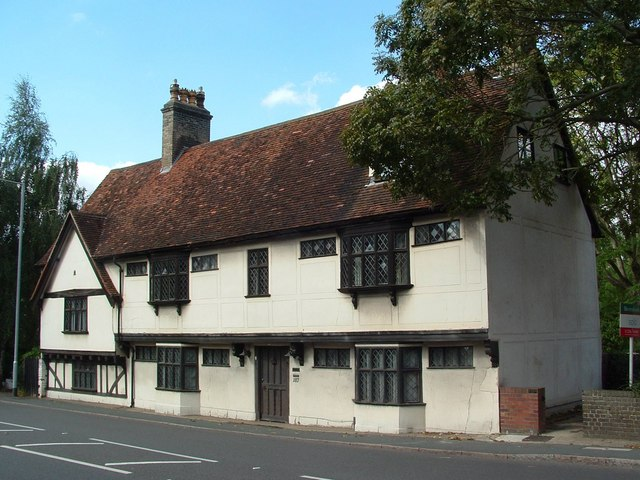
Jaqueline Court, a 17th-century house in Lexden Road.

The site on which Lexden now stands was crossed by the fortifications of Iron Age Colchester, the remains of the earthen ramparts can be seen at Bluebottle Grove, Lexden Park and alongside Straight Road. A number of burial mounds or tumuli remain, notably Lexden Tumulus in Fitzwalter Road which is reputed to be the burial place of Cunobelinus or Cymbeline, the king of the Catuvellauni. The Lexden Medallion was found when the tumulus was excavated in 1924 and is now in the Colchester Castle Museum. Another tumulus is The Mount in Marlowe Way, in which some fragments of Roman pottery and tiles have been found.

The Domesday Book of 1086 records Lexden ("Lassendene") as being one of the Hundreds of Essex. The hundred was named after the village, which was therefore quite likely the meeting place for the hundred court. However, by the 14th century the parish of Lexden had been removed from the hundred to which it gave its name, and had instead been included within the separate jurisdiction of the borough of Colchester. From the 14th century the borough comprised sixteen parishes, four of which (Lexden, Berechurch, Greenstead, and Myland) were classed as "outlying parishes", covering areas that were more peripheral or suburban to the main part of the town as it then was.

The parish church was founded early in the 12th century and a number of houses of medieval origins survive in Lexden Road (the A1124). Parts of the Sun Inn date from 1542 but it has recently become a private house.

In 1648, Lexden was the headquarters of Lord-General Thomas Fairfax during the Siege of Colchester, and his army camped on Lexden Heath. A Parliamentarian fort was built on Great Broom Heath (now called Hilly Fields) which overlooks the town.

During the 18th century a number of large houses were built including Lexden Park on the corner of Church Road, and the Manor House was rebuilt. The main road became a turnpike in 1707 and a cottage used as a toll house survives. Lexden Heath was a large area of common land used for grazing, horse races and military camps; it was inclosed by Act of Parliament in 1821. This enlarged the estate of the lord of the manor, the Reverend John Rawstorn Papillon, who was an acquaintance of Jane Austen and whose niece married Jane's brother Henry. Straight Road was created at this time to make a way across the new inclosures to the hamlet of Shrub End, which became a separate ecclesiastical parish in 1845.

The small and decrepit medieval church of St Leonard was demolished in 1820 and a new church was built slightly to the south, designed in the Early English style by M. G. Thompson. A larger chancel was added in 1892. A Methodist chapel was built in Straight Road in 1859 and a mission hall (now Lexden Evangelical Church) in 1885.

A National Day and Sunday School was built in Spring Lane in 1817 and enlarged several times until replaced by Lexden Council School (now Lexden Primary) in 1925. Lexden Park House became the Endsleigh private school in 1955 and then the Endsleigh Annex of the Colchester Institute until 1990. The house itself was converted to apartments and the gardens became a local nature reserve. The Avenue of Remembrance was built in 1933 to relieve traffic on the London Road and as a memorial to the fallen of Colchester in World War I.

Charles Henry Harrod, a businessman involved in retail trade who founded the highly successful Harrods store in London, was born in Lexden.

All the parishes within the borough, including Lexden, were united into a single parish of Colchester matching the borough in 1897. At the 1891 census (the last before the abolition of the civil parish), Lexden had a population of 3,562.

== Education ==
In Lexden, there is one private school, Holmwood House School, which was founded in 1922 and has around three hundred pupils from reception to year eight. St Teresa's Catholic Primary School is an academy school with around two hundred and twenty pupils from reception to year six. Lexden Primary School and Home Farm Primary School are state schools for all children from nursery to year six, Lexden also having a special unit for the hearing impaired. There is also a school for children with special needs, Lexden Springs School.

Providing secondary education, the Colchester Royal Grammar School, Colchester County High School for Girls, Philip Morant School and College and St Mary's School, Colchester are nearby.

== Sports and recreation ==
Lexden has a King George's Field in memorial to King George V.

== Electoral ward ==
Lexden
- Electoral ward for Colchester Borough Council

Ward Information
- Created: Unknown
- Abolished: 2016
- Councillors: 2 (2002–2016); 3 (1976–2002)
- Electorate: 4,378 (2015)
- Created from: Unknown
- Replaced by: Lexden & Braiswick; Prettygate

Overlaps
- Parliament constituency: Colchester (Unknown-1983; 1997–present); Colchester South & Maldon (1983–1997)
- County division: Constable

The suburb was covered by the Lexden ward and elected 2 councillors to sit on Colchester Borough Council. The ward was previously represented by 3 councillors from 1976 to 2002.

The ward was abolished at the 2016 election and parts were amalgamated with the enlarged Prettygate ward and the new Lexden & Braiswick ward.
