= Henry Tindall =

British headmaster, priest, and athlete

Personal information
- Born: 4 February 1863 Margate, Kent, England
- Died: 10 June 1940 (aged 77) Peasmarsh, East Sussex, England

Sport
- Sport: Athletics
- Event: 440/880 yards

The Reverend Henry Charles Lenox Tindall (4 February 1863 – 10 June 1940) was a British head master, priest and world-record-holding track athlete; he was also an English first-class cricketer active 1893–95 who played for Kent. He was born in Margate and died in Peasmarsh.

== Biography ==
Tindall was born in Margate, Kent, on 4 February 1863 and was educated at Christ's College, Cambridge; while at university he ran and swam, and in 1884–1885 he was Cambridge quarter-mile champion. In 1886, he was president of the University Athletic Club, in the same year he won both the 100 yards and quarter-mile race against Oxford University.

Tindall became the British quarter–mile champion after winning the AAA Championships title at the 1888 AAA Championships. In 1889, he successfully defended his quarter–mile title at the 1889 AAA Championships, recording 48.5 seconds, a world record that also stood as a British amateur record until 1911. At the 1889 championships, he also won the half–mile title.

After university he played Rugby for Rosalyn Park and in cricket appeared for Kent from 1893 to 1895. In 1894 he appeared at a match in Hastings for the South of England against The Australians. Tindall was also a member of the Rye Golf Club from 1894 until is death.

He left Cambridge with a second-class degree in the mathematics tripos and he had also been a Tancred Divinity Scholar. He became a mathematical master at Hurst Court School in Hastings, becoming the headmaster in 1905. In 1934 he left the school to become rector of Iden.

== Bibliography ==
- Carlaw, Derek (2020). Kent County Cricketers, A to Z: Part One (1806–1914) (PDF). Cardiff: ACS.
