= Thomas Garnier (cricketer) =

English cricketer and cleric

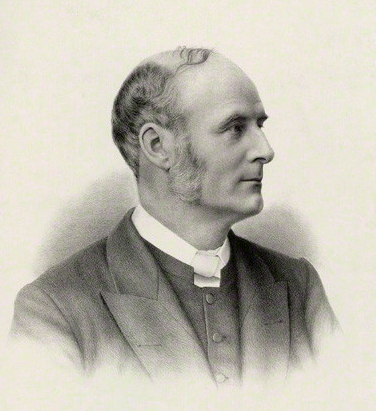

Personal information
- Full name: Thomas Parry Garnier
- Born: 22 February 1841; Longford, Derbyshire, England
- Died: 18 March 1898 (aged 57); St Moritz, Graubünden, Switzerland
- Batting: Right-handed
- Relatives: Thomas Garnier senior (father); Edward Garnier (brother); George Tottenham (nephew); John Garnier (uncle)

Domestic team information
- Years: Team
- 1861–1863: Oxford University
- 1864: Hampshire

Career statistics
Competition	First-class
Matches	13
Runs scored	287
Batting average	13.66
100s/50s	–/–
Top score	35
Catches/stumpings	4/–
- Source: Cricinfo, 26 January 2010

Thomas Parry Garnier (22 February 1841 – 18 March 1898) was an English first-class cricketer and clergyman.

== Cricket and ecclesiastical career ==
The second son of Thomas Garnier, he was born in February 1841 at Longford, Derbyshire. He was educated firstly at Twyford School, before attending Winchester College. From there, he matriculated to Balliol College, Oxford in 1859. While studying at Oxford, Garnier was a member of the Oxford University Cricket Club, making his debut in first-class cricket for the club against the Marylebone Cricket Club (MCC) at Oxford in 1861.

He played first-class cricket for Oxford until 1863, making nine appearances; he was awarded a blue in each of his three years in the Oxford team. He scored 199 runs in these matches, at an average of 15.30, with a highest score of 35. Amongst his Oxford contemporaries, the saying "Tommy Gariner's straight bat was the prettiest sight in Oxford" prevailed during his time playing for the university.

Additionally, whilst studying at Oxford, he also made appearances for the Gentlemen in the 1861 Gentlemen v Players fixtures, and for the Gentlemen of the North against the Gentlemen of the South in 1862. Garnier graduated from Oxford with a first class degree in history. His association with Oxford University remained following his graduation, with him being elected a fellow of All Souls College, Oxford in 1863.

Garnier played in Hampshire County Cricket Club's fourth first-class match, against Middlesex at Southampton in 1864. He was ordained as a deacon in the Church of England in 1866, and in the same year he was appointed curate at Welwyn. From 1868 to 1871, he served as vicar of South Hinksey near Oxford, where he was instrumental in securing funds to build schools in the parish and erect a new church at New Hinksey in 1870.

He was appointed chaplain to the Bishop of London in 1871, a post he held until 1873. He then undertook ecclesiastical duties in Norfolk, as reverend at Cranworth (1874–1895) and Banham (1895–1898). He was made an honorary canon at Norwich Cathedral in 1884, succeeding his uncle, Edward Southwell Keppel. In 1893, he undertook further duties as examining chaplain to the Bishop of Norwich and commissary to the Bishop of the Riverina. Garnier was an opponent of church disestablishment at church congresses and wrote a number of ecclesiastical histories.

Garnier married Louisa Vernon Warner in 1873, who was the daughter of George Venables-Vernon, 5th Baron Vernon. She predeceased him by four years. In his final months, Garnier was obliged to spend time in Switzerland at St Moritz due to a lung affection. Whilst recuperating at St Moritz, he became afflicted with influenza, which worsened his health. He died there on 18 March 1898, surrounded by his three children. His body was returned to England, where he was buried alongside his wife at Cranworth. His brother, Edward, was also a first-class cricketer and clergyman, as was his uncle. His nephew was the cricketer and civil servant, George Tottenham.

== Publications ==
His publications include:

- Church or Dissent (1876)
- The Parish Church (1876)
- Graduated Church Readers (1882)
- Title Deeds of the Church of England (1890)
- First Book of the Church (1892)
- First Book of Church Principles (1894)
- First Book of Worship (1895)
- A Manual on the Means of Grace (1896)
- First Book of the Bible (posthumously published, 1899)
