= Thomas Garnier (dean of Winchester) =

English clergyman and botanist

The Reverend Thomas Garnier FLS
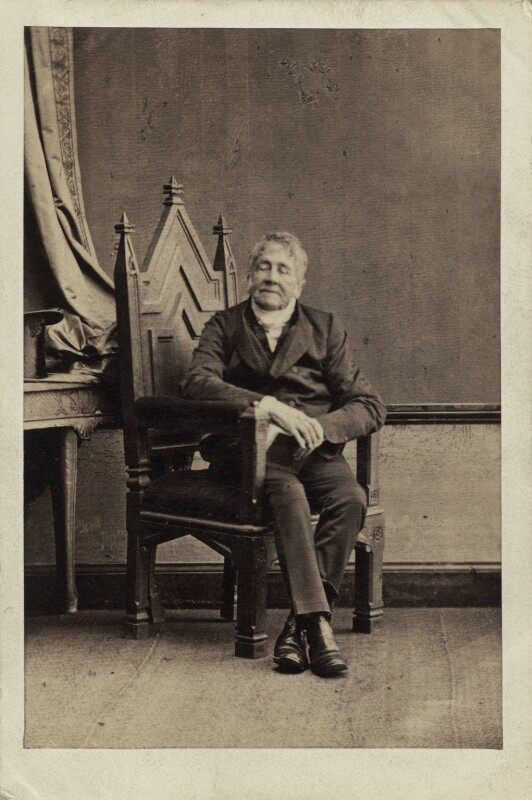
- Garnier in 1861 by Camille Silvy
- Born: 26 February 1776; Rookesbury, Hampshire, England
- Died: 29 June 1873 (aged 97); Winchester, England
- Other names: Thomas Garnier the Elder
- Education: Worcester College, Oxford; All Souls College, Oxford
- Occupation(s): Clergyman, botanist
- Spouse: Mary Parry
- Children: 8, including Thomas and John
- Father: George Charles Garnier

Thomas Garnier the Elder FLS (26 February 1776 – 29 June 1873) was an English clergyman and botanist. He was Dean of Winchester from 1840 to 1872.

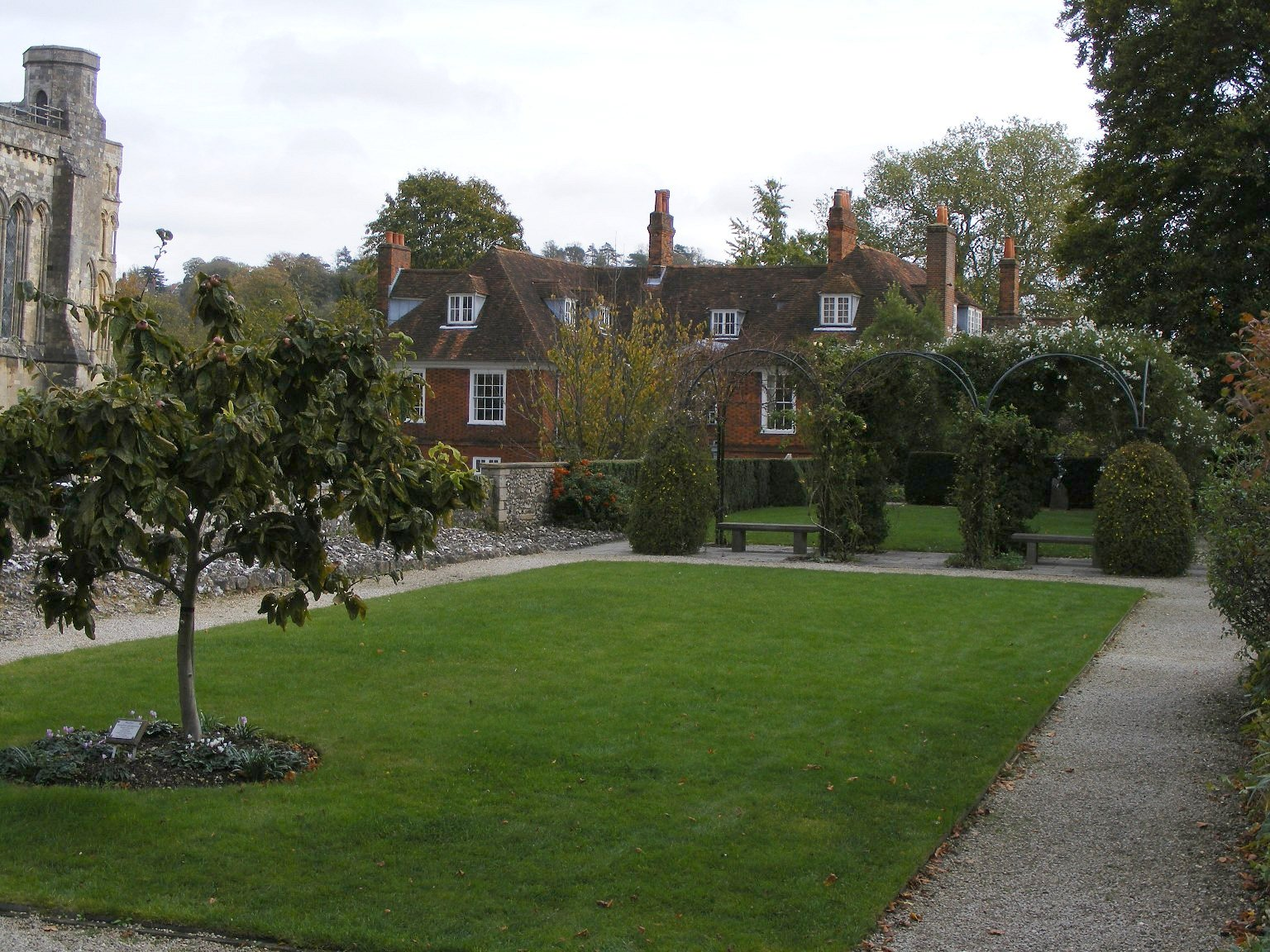
The Dean Garnier Garden in Winchester.

== Life ==
Thomas Garnier was born in Rookesbury, Hampshire, on 26 February 1776, the son of George Charles (1739–1819) and Margaret Garnier (d. 1807); his family was of Huguenot origin. He was educated at Hyde Abbey School and matriculated at Worcester College, Oxford, in 1793; he became a Fellow of All Souls College and graduated BCL 1800 and DCL 1850. He was appointed Rector of Bishopstoke, Hampshire, in 1807, retaining this with the deanery.

At Worcester College, Garnier's tutor was Stephen Long Jacob, who is said to have given him a taste for gardening. In 1798, encouraged by Sir Joseph Banks, he joined the Linnean Society of London. He was a founding member of the Hampshire Horticultural Society in 1818. Dean Garnier's Garden in Winchester's cathedral close is named after him.

In the 1860s, he was an 'anti-muckabite' campaigner for a sewerage system for Winchester. The road to the town's first sewerage pumping station was later named after him.

Garnier was a friend of Palmerston and a staunch Whig. He died in Winchester on 29 June 1873.

== Family ==
In 1805, Garnier married Mary Parry, daughter of Caleb Hillyer Parry M.D. They had four sons and four daughters. Of the sons:

- Thomas Garnier, rowed in the first university boat race, was Dean of Lincoln from 1860 to 1863 and married Lady Caroline Elizabeth Keppel, daughter of William Charles Keppel, fourth Earl of Albemarle, and his wife Elizabeth Southwell, daughter of Edward Southwell, 20th Baron de Clifford.
- John Garnier was a first-class cricketer.
