= Thomas Garnier (dean of Lincoln) =

Dean of Lincoln

The Reverend Thomas Garnier
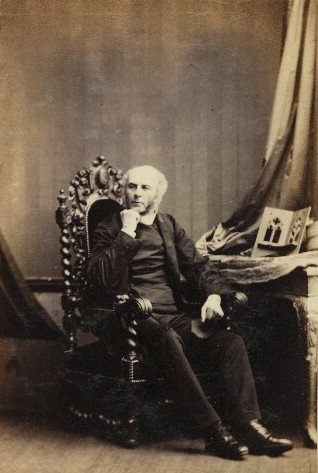
- Garnier in 1861
- Born: 15 April 1809; Bishopstoke, England
- Died: 7 December 1863 (aged 54); Lincoln, Lincolnshire, England
- Other name: Thomas Garnier the Younger
- Education: Worcester College, Oxford; Winchester College
- Occupation: Clergyman
- Spouse: Lady Caroline Keppel (m. 1835)
- Children: 12, including Thomas and Edward
- Father: Thomas Garnier
- Relatives: Caleb Hillier Parry (grandfather); William Edward Parry (uncle)

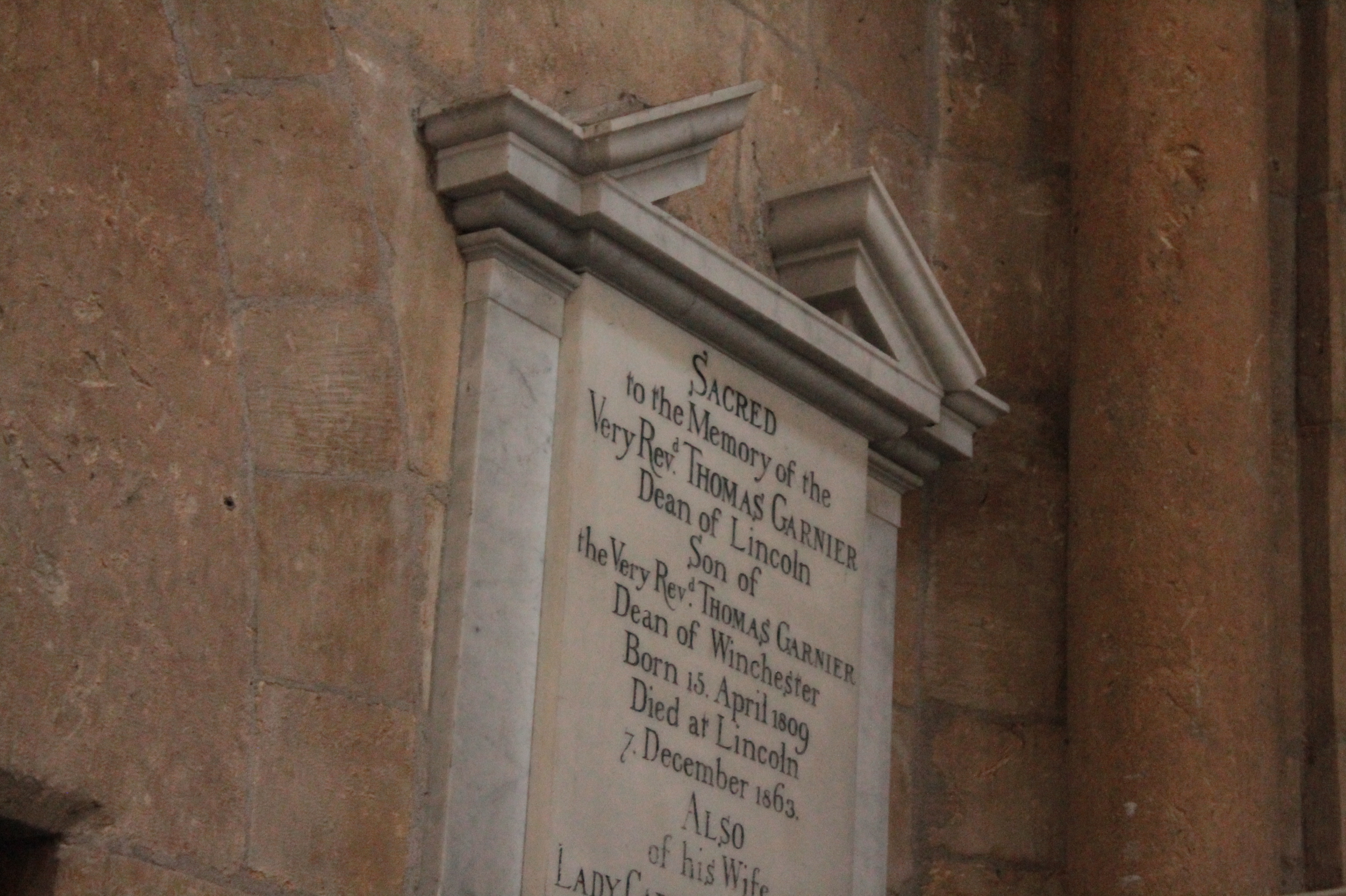
The grave of Rev Thomas Garnier, Lincoln Cathedral

Thomas Garnier the Younger (15 April 1809 – 7 December 1863) was Dean of Lincoln from 1860 until his death in 1863.

== Life ==
Garnier was born on 15 April 1809, the second son of the Rev. Thomas Garnier the elder, Dean of Winchester Cathedral, and Mary Parry, daughter of Caleb Hillier Parry and sister of Arctic navigator Sir William Edward Parry. Garnier was born at his father's living of Bishopstoke, Hampshire. He was educated at Winchester School, and proceeded to Worcester College, Oxford. He graduated with a B.A. in 1830, and that year was elected, like his father before him, to a fellowship at All Souls' College, Oxford. At Oxford he was distinguished for excellence in all athletic sports, and he was one of the crew in the first university boat race. He took the degree of B.C.L. in 1833. In the same year he was ordained deacon; he was ordained priest the following year, both times by the Bishop of Oxford.

After having served the curacy of Old Alresford, Hampshire, he was appointed to the college living of Lewknor, Oxfordshire, and was in 1840 presented by the Earl of Leicester to the rectory of Longford, Derbyshire. Here he resided till 1849, when he was made chaplain of the House of Commons, holding with it the preachership of the London Lock Hospital. In 1850 Lord John Russell, then prime minister, nominated him to the important crown living of Holy Trinity, Marylebone, where he stayed until his resignation in 1859.

In 1859, on the death of Henry Erskine, Garnier was nominated by Lord Palmerston to the deanery of Ripon, from which he was transferred in 1860 to that of Lincoln. Shortly after his appointment to Lincoln he met with an accidental fall, from the effects of which he never recovered. He died at the deanery 7 December 1863 in his fifty-fourth year. He is buried in Lincoln Cathedral.

== Works ==
Garnier was the author of a pamphlet on the "New Poor-law Amendment Act", addressed to the labouring classes to disprove the supposed injurious effects of the proposed changes. He published in 1851 "Sermons on Domestic Duties", separate sermons and pamphlets.

== Family ==
On 23 May 1835, Garnier married Lady Caroline Keppel, youngest daughter of William Keppel, 4th Earl of Albemarle, with whom he had a family of six sons and six daughters. They were:

- John Garnier; eldest son, married in 1862 Mary Caroline Puller, daughter of Christopher William Puller.
- Thomas Parry Garnier; married Louisa Venables-Vernon, daughter of George Venables-Vernon, 5th Baron Vernon.
- Keppel Garnier R.N.; married 1871 Edith Mary Reynolds, daughter of Henry Revell Reynolds III.
- Arthur Edmund Garnier
- Edward Southwell Garnier; married in 1875 Annie Maria Dixon, daughter of Henry Isaac Dixon of Stumperlowe Hall.
- Russell Montagu Garnier; sixth son, married in 1888 Caroline Henrietta Sneyd, daughter of Walter Sneyd.
- Mary Garnier; eldest daughter, married in 1868 Hon. Charles Gounter Legge, chief constable, and was mother of William Kaye Legge.
- Anne Emily Garnier; married in 1858 Edward Newdigate.
- Emily Caroline Garnier; married in 1862 Philip Oxenden Papillon, a grandson of Sir Henry Oxenden, 7th Baronet.
- Margaret Gertrude Garnier; married the Rev. Francis Fortescue Cornish, inspector of schools.
- Mabel Caroline Garnier; married in 1888 Frederick St. Leger Tottenham.
- Ethel Bertha Garnier; married in 1888 William Dunbar Blyth of Queen's College Cork and the Indian Civil Service.
