= Chapel of Rest, Bourne =

Deconsecrated chapel in Bourne

Chapel of Rest
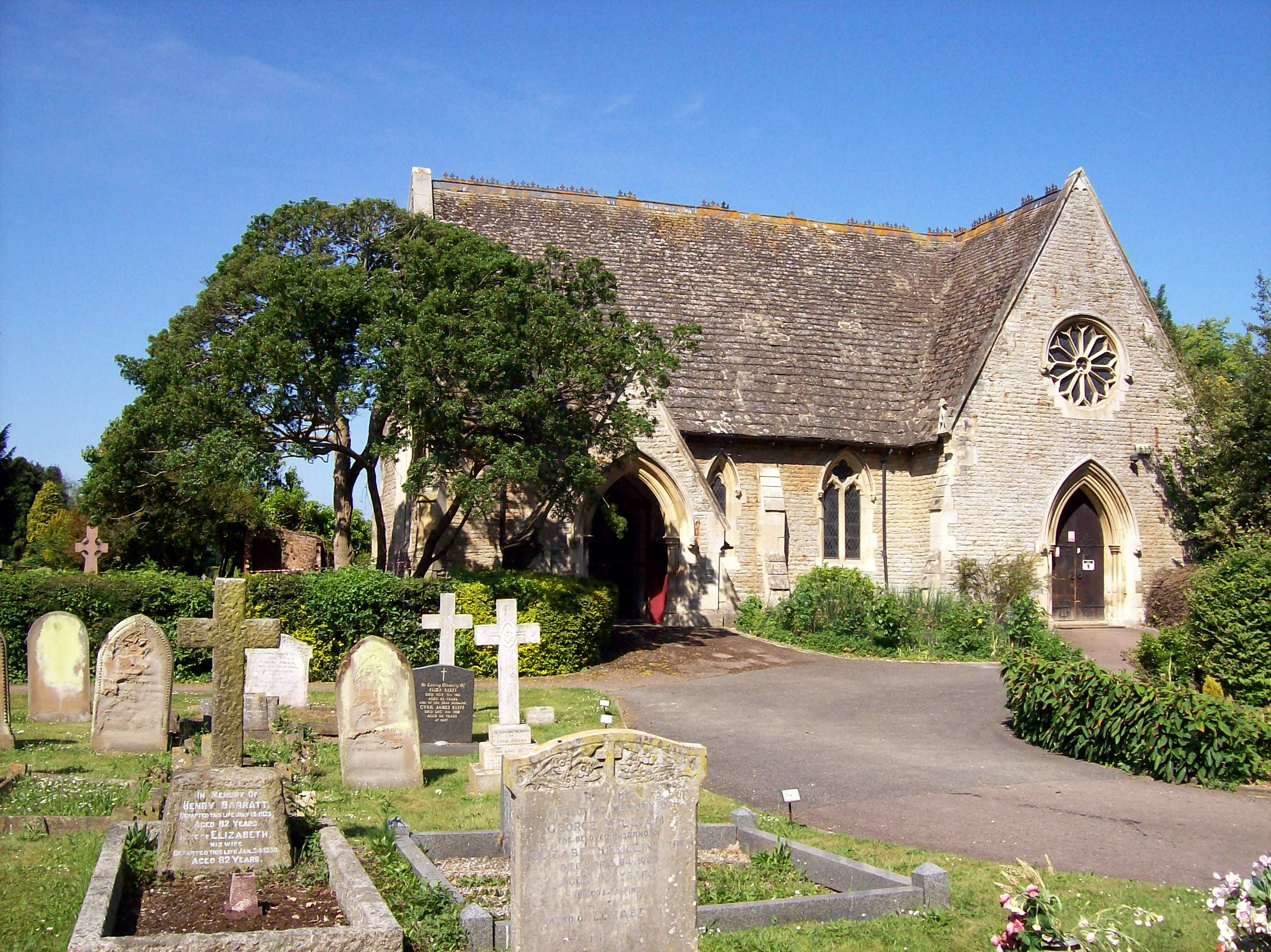
- Chapel of Rest in Bourne Cemetery

- Location within Lincolnshire
- 52°45′39″N 0°22′14″W
- Location: Lincolnshire

History
- Built: 1854–1855

Site notes
- Architect: Edward Browning
- Architectural style: Gothic Revival

Listed Building – Grade II
- Official name: Chapel of Rest, Bourne Cemetery
- Designated: 4 April 2007
- Reference no.: 1391910

The Chapel of Rest is a Grade II listed cemetery chapel in Bourne, Lincolnshire. It was built in 1854–5 in Gothic Revival style, and designed by the noted local architect Edward Browning. It consisted of both Anglican and Nonconformist chapels in a single building.

== History ==
=== Construction ===
The chapel was designed by Edward Browning in February 1854, for the new town cemetery, and opened in May 1855. It had a T-plan, forming an unusual layout of two chapels in one building, with a prominent rose window above the door in the gable on the east side, featuring geometrical tracery. It is considered of special historic interest as it is an early example of cemetery architecture outside of London, following the passing of the Burial Act 1853, by Historic England. It passed to the ownership of Bourne Urban District Council in 1899 following reorganisations of local government from the Local Government Act 1888, and then Bourne Town Council in 1974, following the former's abolition following the passing of the Local Government Act 1972.

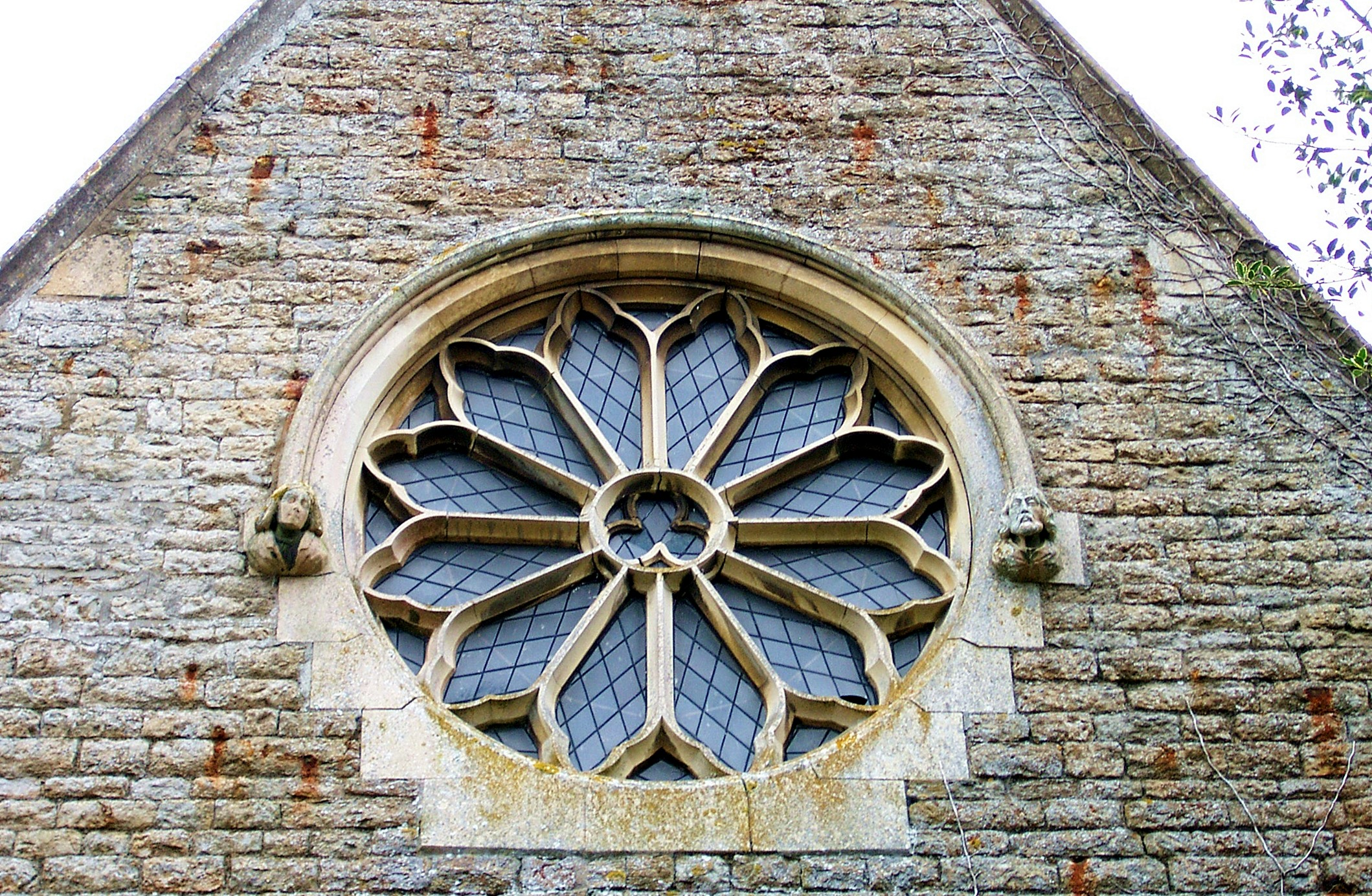
Detail of window

=== Deconsecration ===
The chapel was officially deconsecrated at the request of the town council on the 1st of December 2004, and was subsequently used as a storage facility. In January 2007, it emerged that the local council planned to demolish the chapel due to prohibitive costs of renovation. The mayor of the town stated the council was not convinced there was enough public support to justify the cost of restoring the chapel in February 2007. However, an application to have it Grade listed by local historian Rex Needle was granted by the Department for Culture, Media and Sport on the 4th of April 2007.

In July 2022, a member of the local council again floated the idea of de-listing the building to allow the option of demolition in the future, as it was again in a dilapidated state. However, extensive repairs beginning on the 22nd of August were announced to the Collyweston slate roof, in order to prevent leaks.
