= George Maddox (architect) =

British architect

George Maddox (1760 in Monmouth – 1843 in London) was an architect, draughtsman, painter and teacher.

== Career ==
Born the son of a builder in Monmouth, Maddox was apprenticed to his father and then worked in London as an assistant to John Soane, whom he assisted on several projects, including the Bank of England. Throughout his architectural career, Maddox exhibited drawings and paintings (watercolour over pencil). He exhibited four works (one in 1796, one in 1812, and two in 1819) at the Royal Academy. In 1790 the Duke of Cumberland, George III’s brother, commissioned him to build an opera house in Leicester Square. Maddox drew plans for the opera house, but the project was abandoned upon the death of the duke; the cancellation was a severe financial blow to Maddox. In 1824 Maddox was probably the architect for Strensham Court (which was destroyed by a fire in 1974). The builders employed for Strensham were Bryan Browning and George Woolcott. Bryan Browning was to establish an architectural practice in Stamford and later his son Edward Browning was apprenticed to Maddox before he joined his father's practice. In 1824 Jeffrey Wyatville hired Maddox as his assistant in remodeling Windsor Castle. Also in 1824 Maddox was a founding member of the Society of British Artists and became a frequent exhibitor there. He was the architect for many private buildings and shops, built in the Anglo-Greek style, in the Strand, Conduit Street, Southampton Street, Tavistock Place and Bloomsbury. In old age, his architectural practice completely ceased, and he earned his living by teaching drawing and sometimes making designs and drawings for architects. His papers are in the archives of the Royal Institute of British Architects. His last residence was at Castle Street, Holborn.

For many years Maddox taught drawing at No. 7 Furnival's Inn. On the first floor were two rooms for use by his students, his bedroom and his library of 5,000 volumes; on the second floor were his living rooms and a museum of ancient sculpture. Among his students were Cockerell, Decimus Burton, Hosking and several other eminent persons.

== Literature ==
- Colvin H. A (1995), Biographical Dictionary of British Architects 1600-1840. Yale University Press, 3rd edition London.
