= Bourne Town Hall, Lincolnshire =

Municipal building in Bourne, Lincolnshire, England

Bourne Town Hall
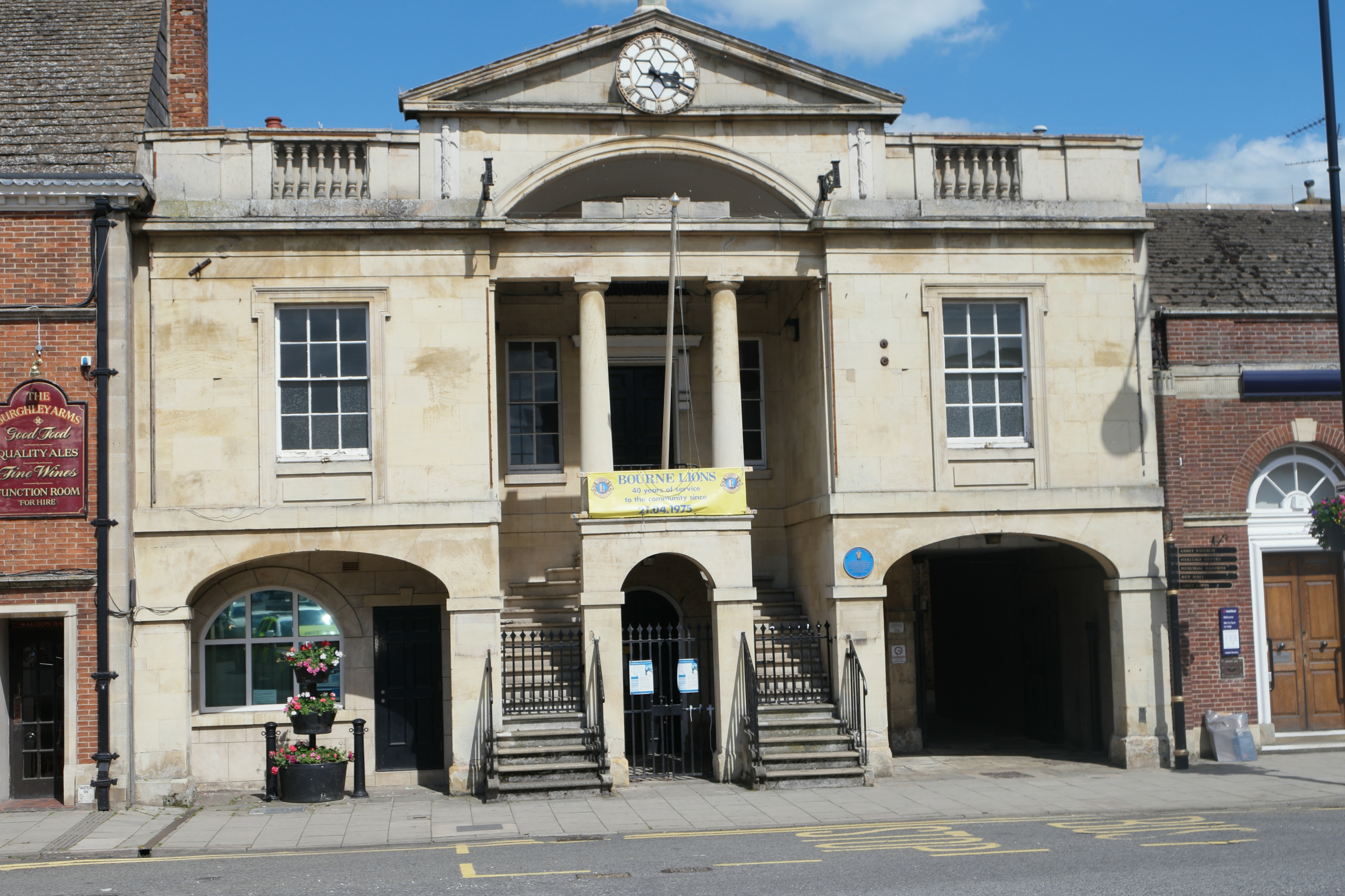
- Bourne Town Hall

- Shown in Lincolnshire
- 52.7683°N 0.3769°W
- Location: North Street, Bourne

History
- Built: 1821

Site notes
- Architect: Bryan Browning
- Architectural style: Neoclassical style

Listed Building – Grade II
- Official name: Town Hall
- Designated: 29 September 1972
- Reference no.: 1242224

Bourne Town Hall is a municipal building in North Street, Bourne, Lincolnshire, England. The town hall, which was the headquarters of Bourne Urban District Council, is a Grade II listed building.

== History ==
The first town hall was an Elizabethan structure commissioned by the Lord High Treasurer, Lord Burghley, who had been born in the town, in the late 16th century. In the early 19th century civic leaders decided to replace the Elizabethan structure with a new building which would serve both as a market hall and courthouse. The Marquess of Exeter, who owned the site, agreed to donate it to the town to facilitate the project and it was decided that the cost of construction would be met by public subscription.

=== Present building ===
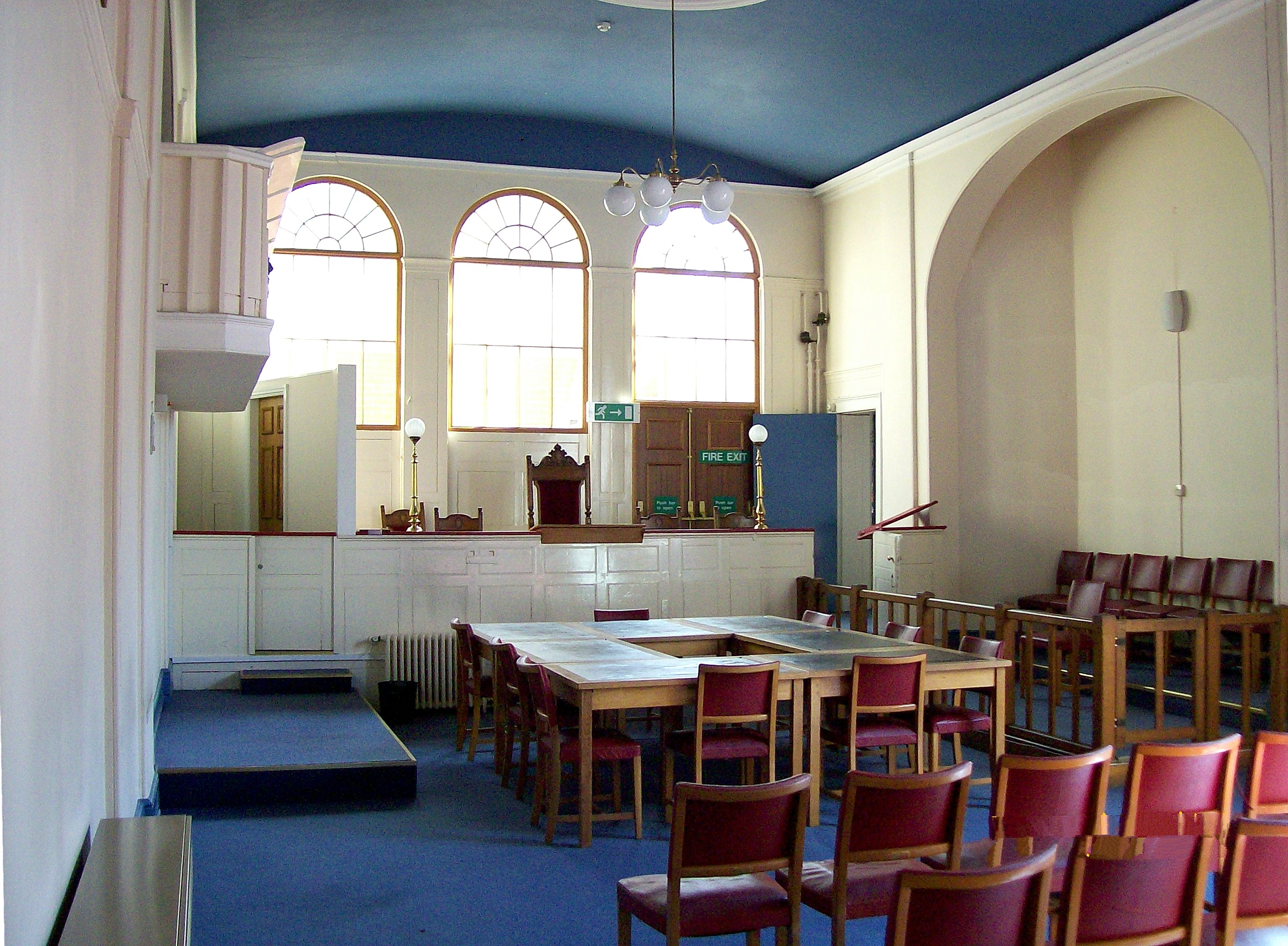
The courtroom at Bourne Town Hall

The new building was designed by a local architect, Bryan Browning, in the neoclassical style and was completed in 1821. The design involved a symmetrical main frontage with three bays facing onto North Street with the end bays containing semi-elliptical-shaped coach arches with sash windows above. The central bay featured two piers on the ground floor, flanked by two recessed flights of stairs leading up to the main entrance on the first floor, with the piers supporting two Doric order columns which in turn supported a frieze, a parapet and, in the centre, a segmental arch which contained a stone inscribed with the date of construction. At roof level there was a pediment and a clock tower above; the hour-striking clock (dated 1821) was by Thwaites & Reed. Internally, the principal rooms were an open area on the ground floor known as "The Shambles ", where markets were held, and a courtroom on the first floor.

The courtroom became the venue for the Kesteven quarter session hearings, alternating with Sleaford, from an early stage. The building also became the home for the local horse-drawn fire engine in 1890 and the clock in the clock tower was illuminated by gas light from 1900. The clock tower was destroyed in a serious fire on 31 October 1933, and rather than replacing the clock tower, civic leaders decided to install a new clock within the pediment at the top of the building. The fire service itself relocated from the town hall to South Street in 1946.

The town hall served as the headquarters of Bourne Urban District Council for much of the 20th century but ceased to be the local seat of government when the enlarged South Kesteven District Council was formed in 1974. Instead, it became the regular meeting place of Bourne Town Council which was formed at that time. The courtroom was redesigned to create a larger waiting area in 1974 and an extension at the rear of the building was completed in 1992.

Magistrates' court hearings in Bourne were withdrawn by Her Majesty's Courts Service in 2008 and the building fell completely vacant after South Kesteven District Council relocated its remaining locally based staff to the new South Kesteven Community Point in the Corn Exchange at Abbey Road in 2014. Bourne Town Council also began using the South Kesteven Community Point as their meeting place at that time.

=== Restoration ===
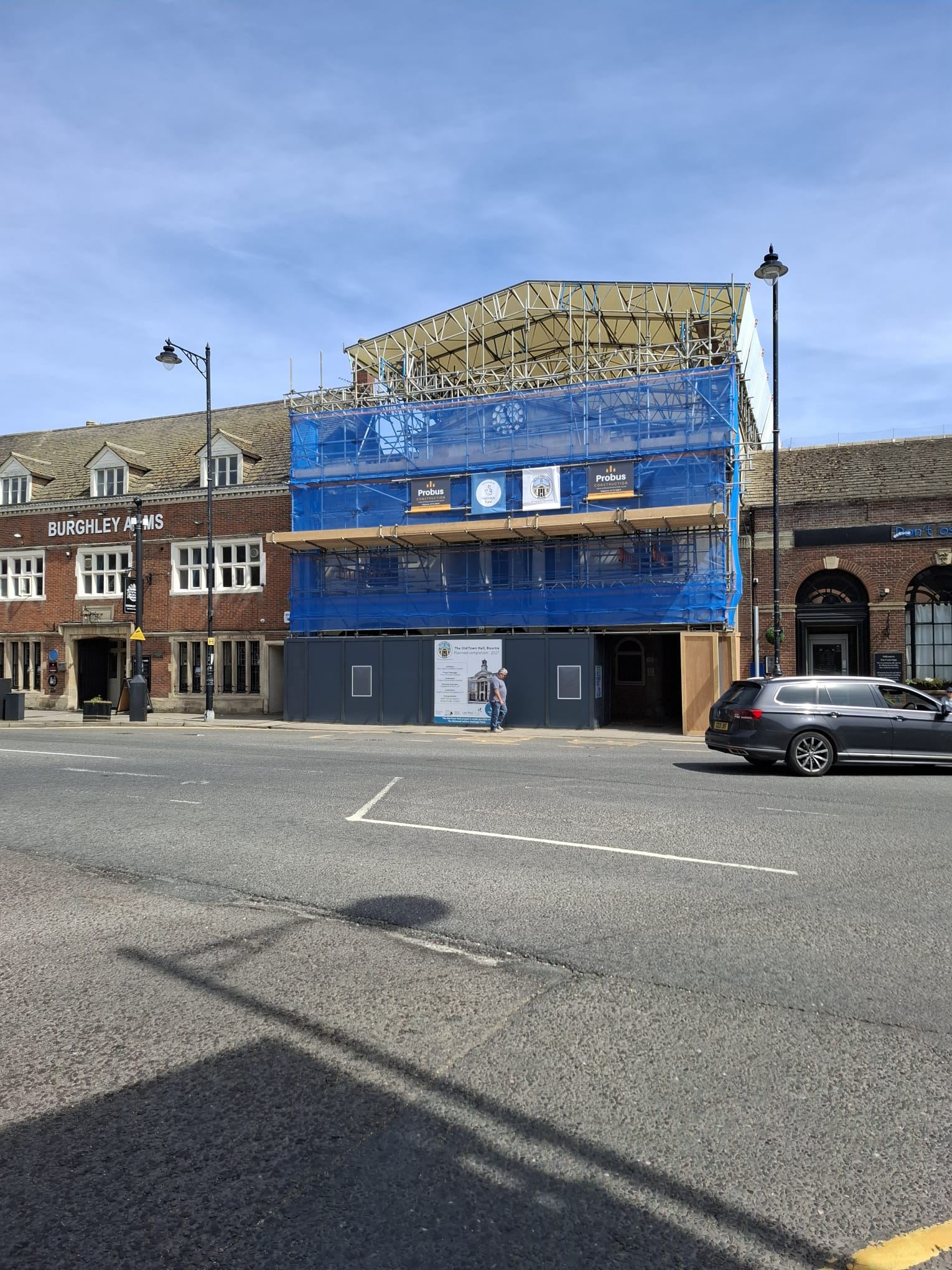
Renovation of the Bourne Town Hall.

In March 2018 ownership of the building passed to a new entity, Bourne Town Hall Trust, a charity which is raising funds to restore the building, re-instate the clock tower (together with the original clock and bell) and convert the building into an accessible arts centre for the local community, which would also feature an 80 seat auditorium in the former courtroom.

In early 2025, a grant of £3.3 million was awarded for restoration work from the National Lottery Heritage Fund, including restoring the clock tower and improving accessibility. Bourne United Charities provided further funding to the trust. Work began in early 2026, and is expected to be completed in spring 2027.
