= Corn Exchange, Stamford =

Commercial building in Stamford, Lincolnshire, England

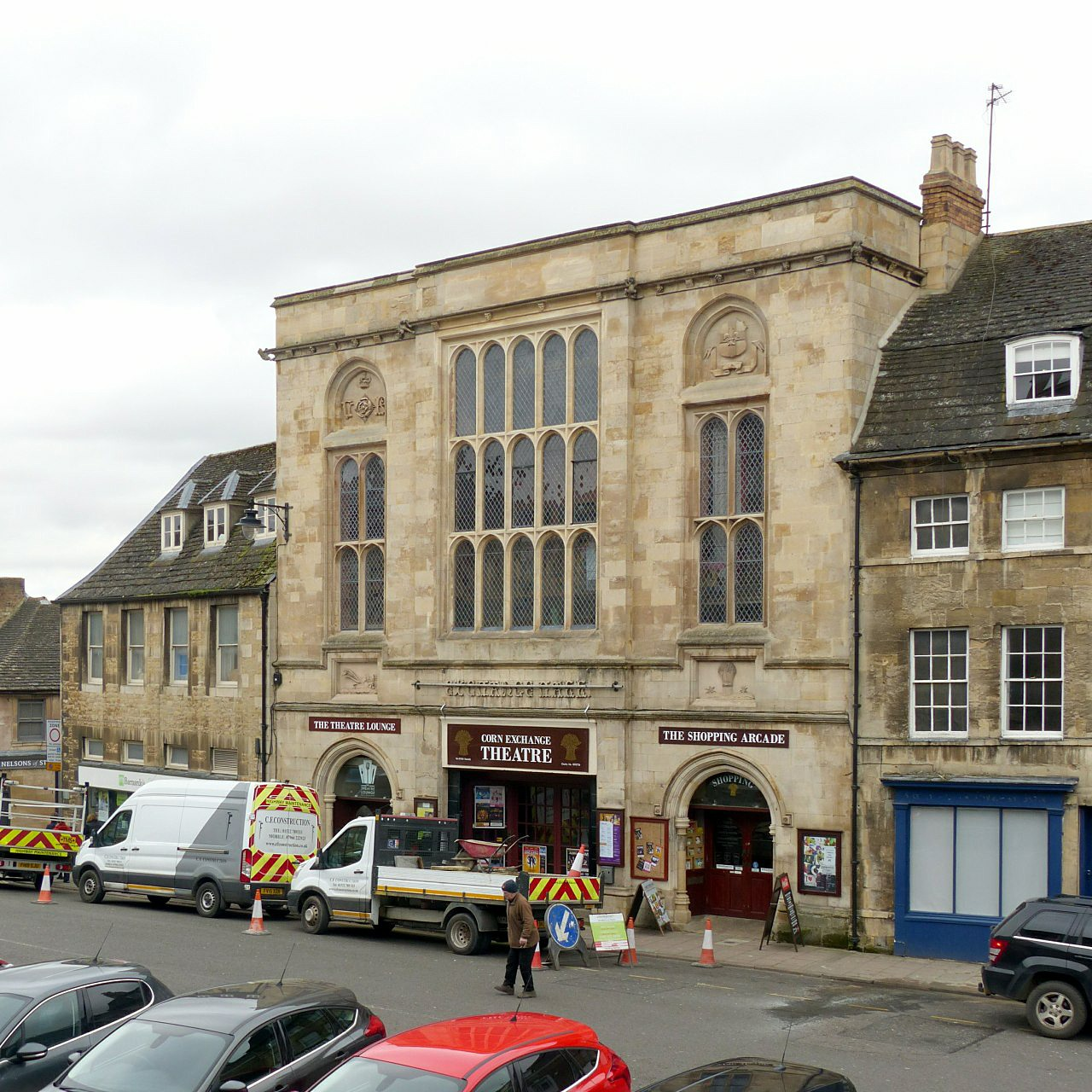
- Corn Exchange, Stamford

- Shown in Lincolnshire
- 52.6531°N 0.4789°W
- Location: Broad Street, Stamford

History
- Built: 1859

Site notes
- Architect: Edward Browning
- Architectural style: Tudor Gothic style

The Corn Exchange is a commercial building in Broad Street, Stamford, Lincolnshire, England. The structure was refurbished between 2001 and 2008 and is now used as a theatre.

== History ==
After King Edgar awarded the right to hold markets to the town in the year 972, trading in corn, cattle and vegetables centred on Broad Street. The market benefited from a modest stone covering, designed by the Rev. Henry de Foe Baker, which was erected on the north side of the street, adjacent to Browne's Hospital, in 1839. In the mid-19th century, a group of local businessmen decided to form a private company, known as the "Stamford Corn Market Company", to finance and commission a purpose-built corn exchange for the town. The site they selected, on the opposite side of the street, had been occupied by the Black Swan Inn.

The new building was designed by Edward Browning in the Tudor Gothic style, built by Henry Bradshaw in ashlar stone and was officially opened on 28 January 1859. The original design involved a symmetrical main frontage of three bays facing onto Broad Street. The central bay, which was slightly projected forward, featured three small arched windows with voussoirs on the ground floor, and a prominent mullioned and transomed window, formed by fifteen arched lights in three tiers, on the first floor. The outer bays contained arched openings, flanked by short columns supporting archivolts and surmounted by hood moulds; there were mullioned and transomed windows, formed by four arched lights in two tiers, on the first floor. Above the arched ground-floor openings, there were oblong panels with carvings depicting a plough and a wheatsheaf, and above the first-floor windows, there were round headed panels with carvings depicting the royal cypher of Queen Victoria and the town coat of arms. At roof level, there was a modillioned cornice and a parapet. Internally, the principal room was the main hall which was 93 feet (28 m) long and 40 feet (12 m) wide.

The use of the building as a corn exchange declined significantly in the wake of the Great Depression of British Agriculture in the late 19th century. It briefly became the New Palace of Varieties in 1913 before closing for the duration of the First World War. After the war it became the Electric Cinema and then the Picture House.

After the interior of the building was badly damaged in a fire in March 1925, the structure was rebuilt behind the original façade to a design by Traylen and Lenton. It was used as a cinema until 1956, and then operated as a dance hall, a theatre, a roller skating rink, an auction house and, latterly, as an antiques market. It was acquired by a newly formed charity, the Corn Exchange Theatre Company, in 2001 and was extensively refurbished at a cost of £1 million between 2003 and 2008 to create a modern auditorium with raked seating. The facade was restored to its original design in 2015. Subsequent performers have included the singer-songwriter, Shaun Ryder, in February 2022, the columnist, Katie Hopkins, in May 2023, and the comedian, Jasper Carrott, in June 2023.

== See also ==
- Corn exchanges in England
