= Bryan Browning =

English architect

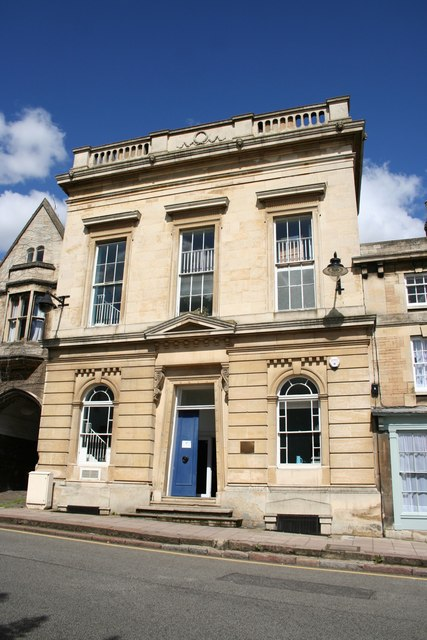
- Camera Obscura House, Stamford
- Born: 1773; Thurlby, Lincolnshire, England
- Died: 1 October 1856 (aged 82–83); Stamford, England
- Occupation: Architect
- Practice: First in partnership in London with George Woolcott, then by himself in Stamford and from 1847 in partnership with his son Edward Browning.

Bryan Browning (1773 – 1 October 1856) was an English architect working in Stamford.

== Life ==
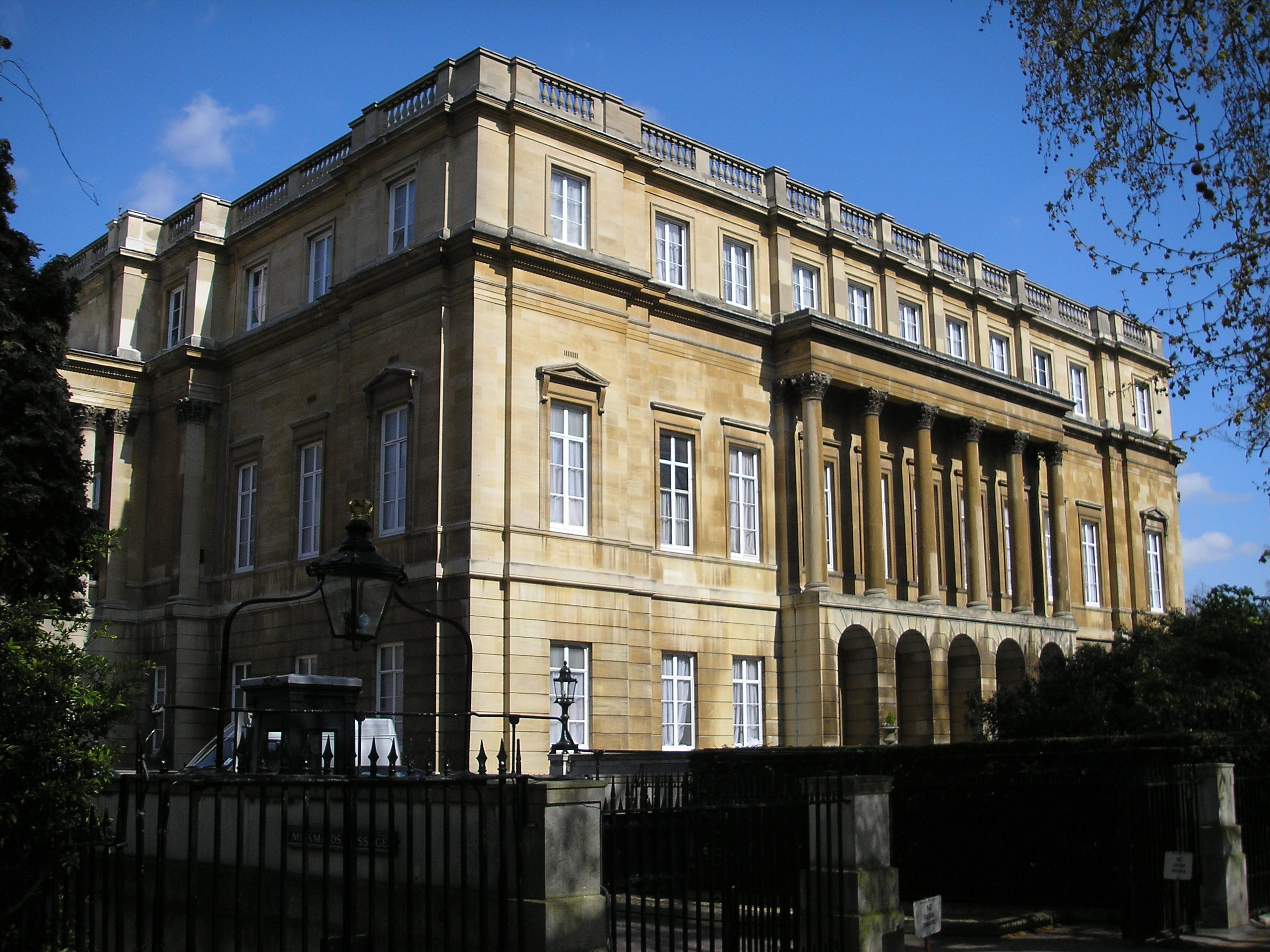
Lancaster House by Benjamin Wyatt and built by Browning and Woolcot

Bryan Browning was born at Thurlby in Lincolnshire in 1773. Nothing is known about his architectural training, but in 1817, he made designs for the rebuilding of Ringwood vicarage in Hampshire. Between about 1820 and 1830, he worked in partnership with George Woolcott in Doughty Street as Builders and Surveyors. In this period, Browning and Woolcott worked as contractors for a number of major building projects in London. This included the building of Lancaster House. They also built Strensham Court in Worcestershire, probably to designs by George Maddox. In 1821, Bryan Browning designed the Sessions House at Bourne, in Lincolnshire and in 1824, he was the architect for the House of Correction at Folkingham. By 1834, he had returned to Lincolnshire and was living at Northorpe near Bourne. He had moved to Stamford by 1838, where he was retained by the Marquess of Exeter and was being paid £180. In 1847, his son, Edward Browning, who had trained under George Maddox, joined the practice. The practice worked from Broad Street, Stamford. Bryan Browning died on 1 October 1856 and is buried in the cemetery there.

== Works ==
=== Public buildings ===
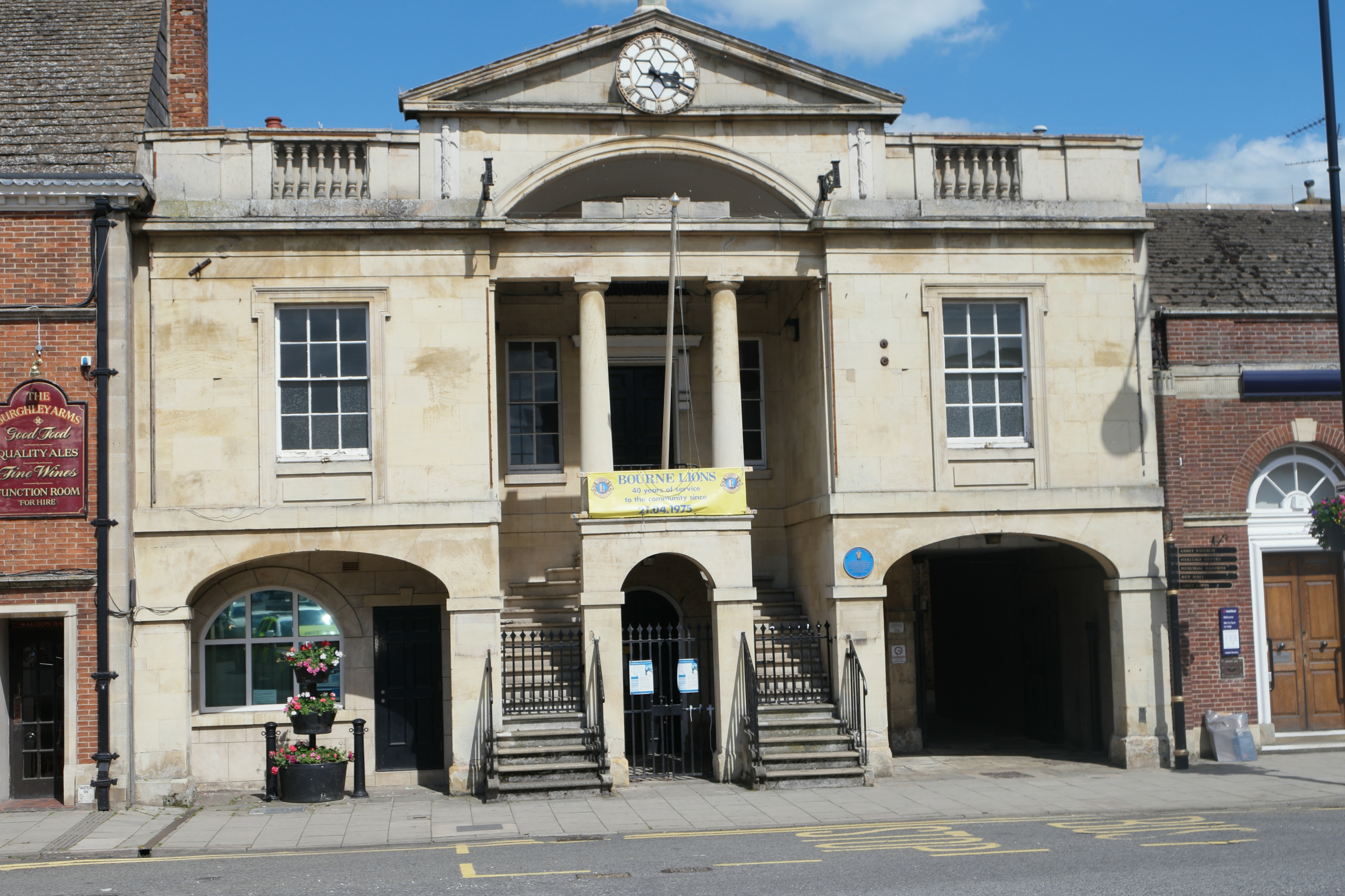
Bourne Sessions House

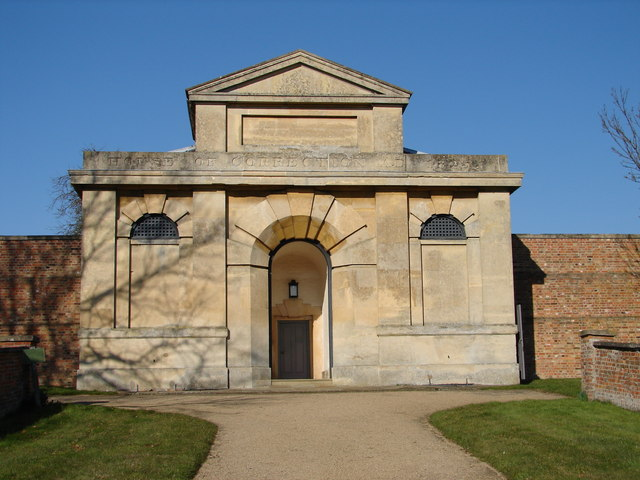
House of Correction, Folkingham

- 1821 Town Hall, Bourne, Lincolnshire
- 1824–5 House of Correction at Folkingham
- 1835 Stamford Workhouse
- 1842 Stamford Institution (Camera Obscura House)

=== School ===
- 1840–1 National School, Titchmarsh, Northamptonshire

=== Houses ===
- 1843 Barn Hill House, Stamford. Remodelled for Lord Exeter.
- 1846–48 Alterations to Apethorpe, Northants

=== Rectories and vicarages ===
- 1833 Alwalton, Northamptonshire
- 1835 Fletton, Hunts
- 1838 Greatford, Lincolnshire
- 1839 Deeping St James, Lincolnshire
- 1840 Stoke Dry Rectory, Rutland

=== Miscellaneous ===
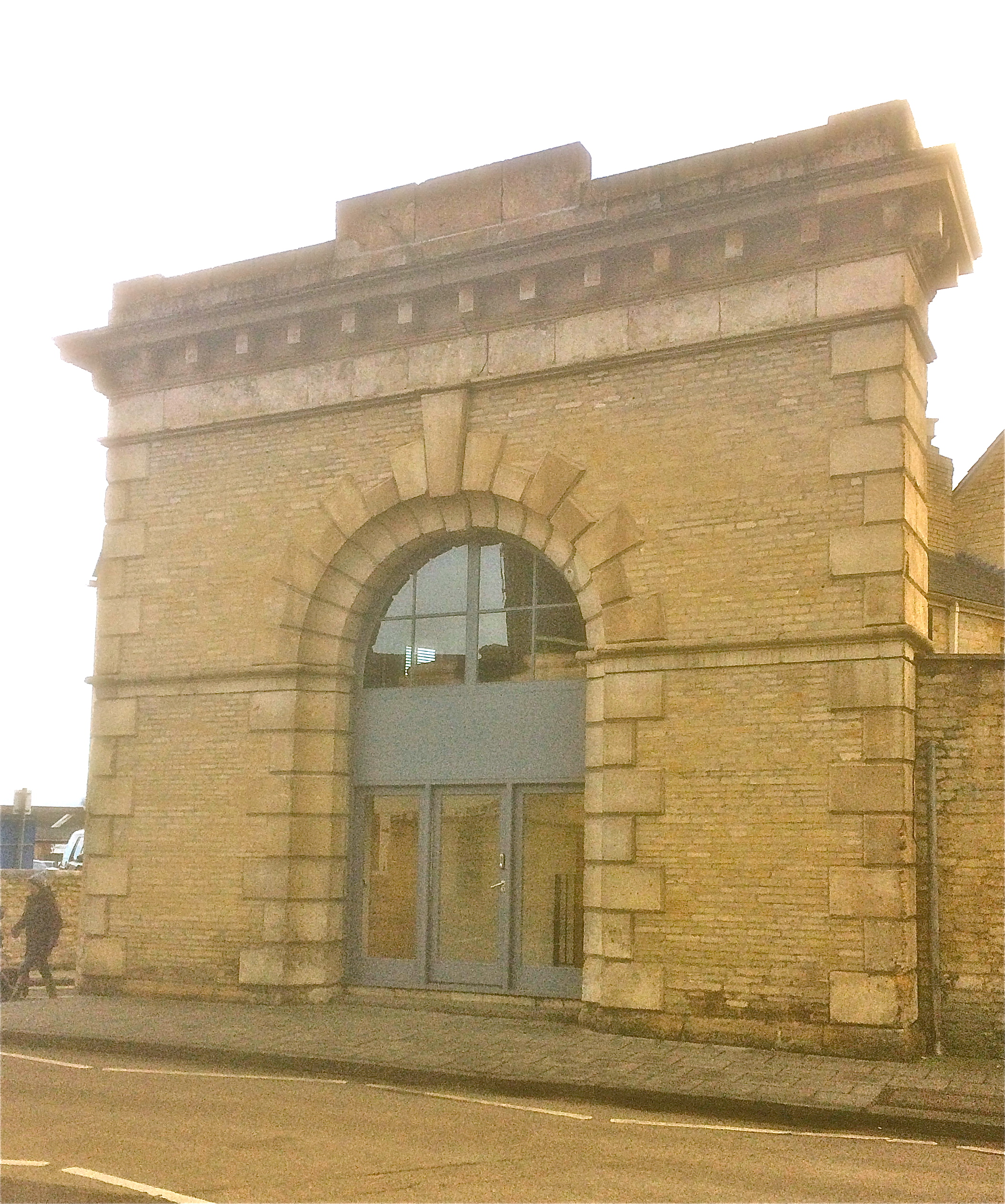
Gate Arch to Blashfield's works, Wharf Road Stamford

- 1845. Grant's Iron Foundry, Wharf Road, Stamford. Built for Lord Exeter. Only the monumental arch now survives. This was built in 1845 as the entrance to Grant's iron foundry and was designed by Bryan Browning. The site became Blashfield's Terracotta Works in 1858. In 1937 the Stamford architect John Charles Traylen rebuilt the arch several feet to the south and parallel with the road.

== Literature ==
- Antram N (revised), Pevsner, N. & Harris J, (1989), The Buildings of England: Lincolnshire, Yale University Press.
- Antonia Brodie (ed), Directory of British Architects, 1834–1914: 2 Vols, British Architectural Library, Royal Institute of British Architects, 2001, Vol 1, pg. 280.
- Colvin H. A (1995), Biographical Dictionary of British Architects 1600–1840. Yale University Press, 3rd edition London, pg.172.
