= Edward Browning =

English architect (1816–1882)

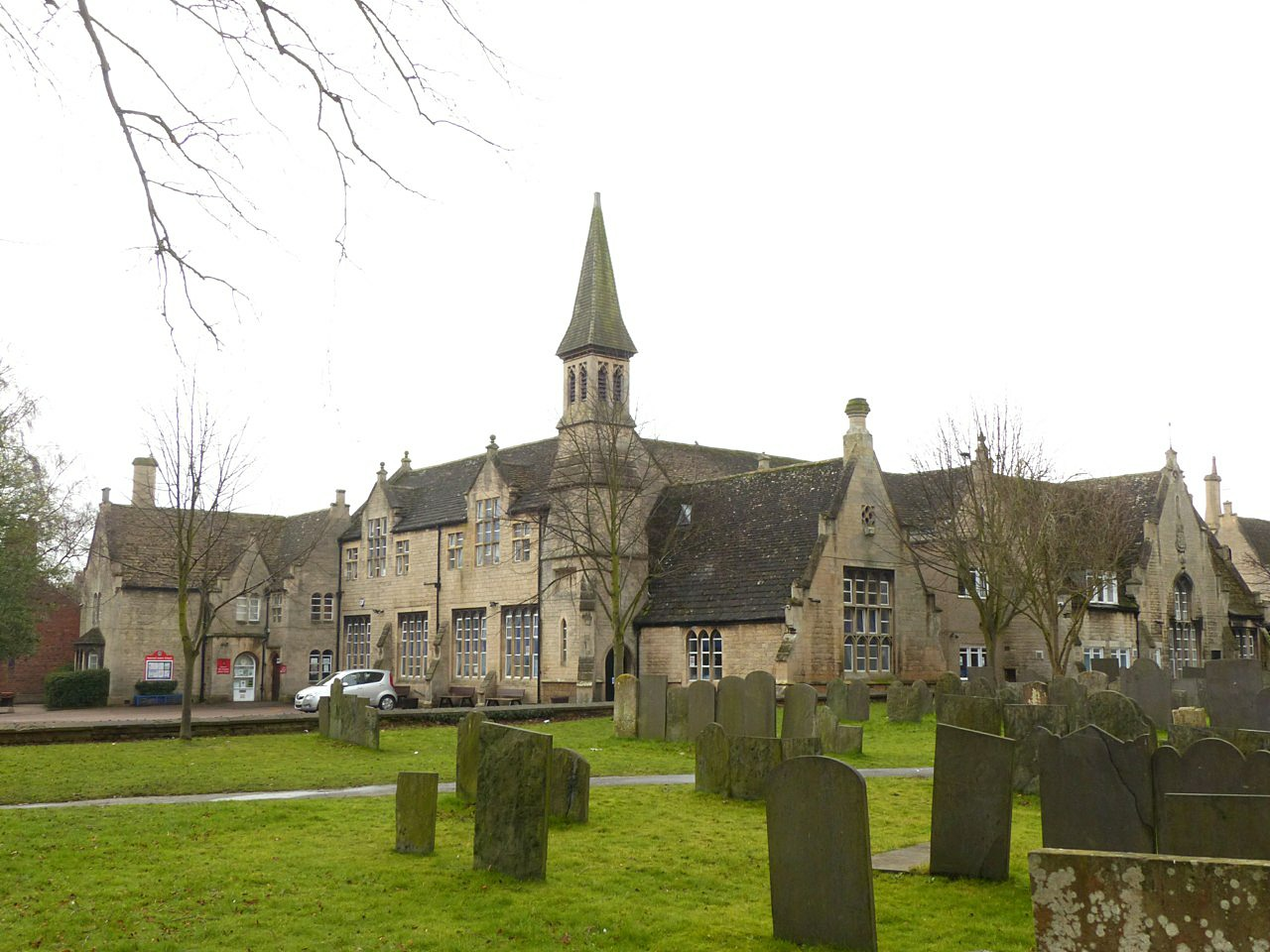
- National School, Grantham 1858-9
- Born: 26 June 1816
- Died: 14 April 1882 (aged 65); Upper Tooting
- Education: Pupil of George Maddox
- Occupation: Architect
- Practice: In Stamford, first in partnership with his father, after 1856 by himself

Edward Bailey Browning (1816–1882) was an English architect working in Stamford.

== Life ==
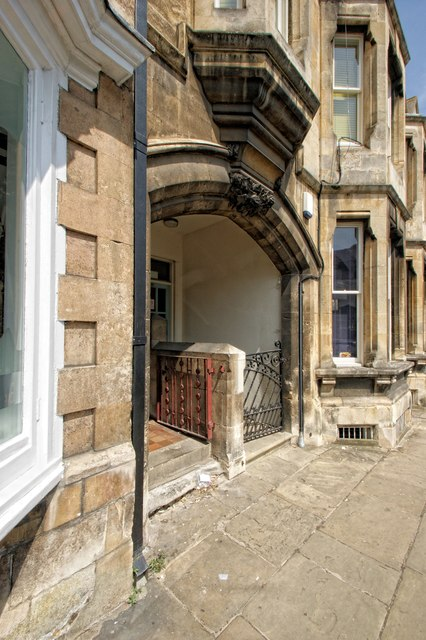
Door arch to 16 Broad Street, Stamford. The Brownings offices

Edward Browning was the son of the Stamford architect Bryan Browning (1773–1856). He was apprenticed to the London architect George Maddox and by 1847 was in partnership with his father. The partnership continued until his father's death in 1856. Edward Browning qualified as an ARIBA on 22 March 1847. Their architectural practice was at No.16, Broad Street, Stamford. He held a number of ecclesiastical appointments as an architect and surveyor. These included the position of Architect and Surveyor for Dean and Chapter of Peterborough Cathedral for the Cathedral Precincts and surveyor of Ecclesiastical Dilapidations for the Archdeaconry of Oakham, which he resigned in 1882 due to ill health. Browning served as Mayor of Stamford in 1862-3 and gave the town its gold mayoral chain. He was after 1870 an auditor for the Midland Bank. The Stamford architect Joseph Boothroyd Corby was a pupil of Browning and the architectural practice was continued by J. C. Traylen.

Apart from the Marquess of Exeter at Burghley House, Edward Browning also worked extensively for a number of the leading aristocratic and landed families in Northamptonshire, Lincolnshire and elsewhere. He took over from his father Bryan Browning with work at Apethorpe Palace for the 12th Earl of Westmorland, and, apart from Apethorpe, designed estate housing, farms and other building at King's Cliffe. For the Marquis of Huntly he added a major extension to Orton Hall near Peterborough. For the Duke of Buccleuch, whose main residence was at Boughton House, he designed a large house at Millwood in Dalton in Furness, in Cumbria. In Essex he undertook a re-modelling of Barrington Hall in Essex for the Barrington/Loundes family. More extensive was his work for Lord Brownlow of Belton House and for other members of the Cust family, which included a number of schools and other buildings in the Grantham area.

Browning was married to Louisa Ann Fox on 12 September 1850 at St Michael's Church, Stamford, and they had 16 children. On retirement he moved to London and died on 14 April 1882.

== Works ==
=== With his father, 1848–1856 ===
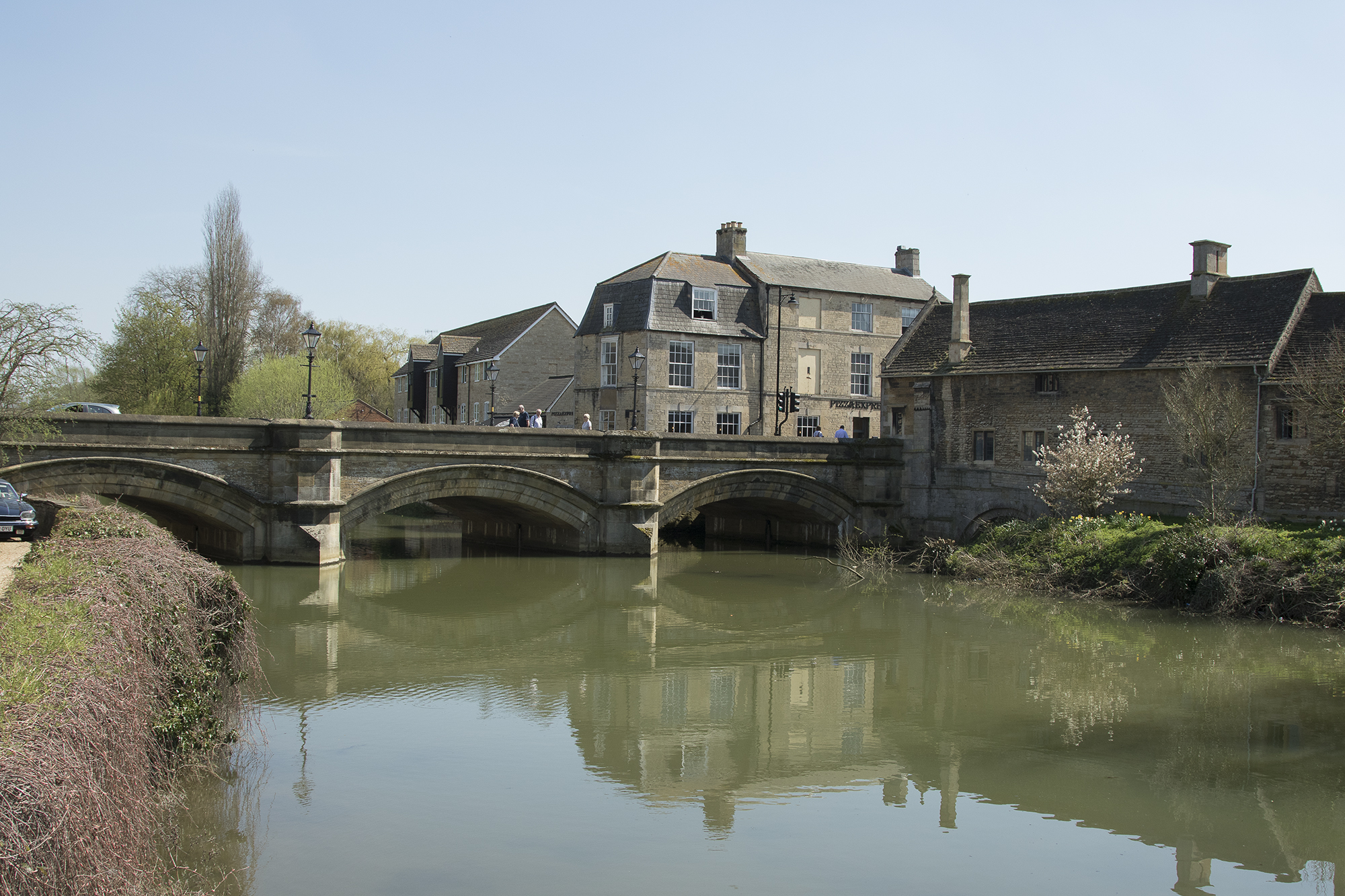
Town Bridge over the River Welland 1848-9

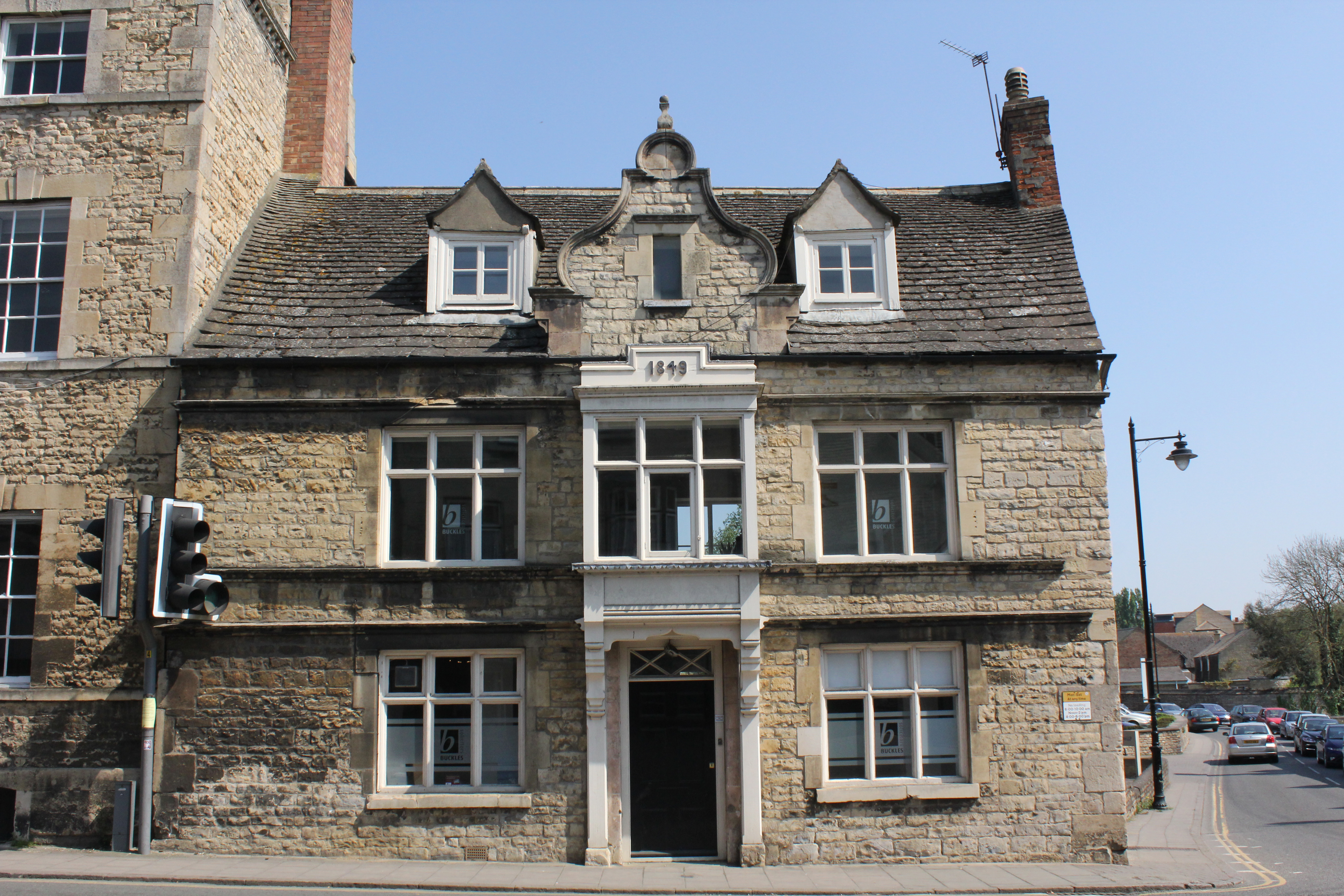
Former Boat Inn, 3 St Mary's Hill, Stamford, 1848

- Stamford Town Bridge, St Mary's Hill /St Martins. Rebuilt over the river Welland by Messrs Browning 1848
- 3 St Mary's Hill. Stamford. 1848. Former Boat and Railway Hotel.
- 4 St Mary's Hill, Stamford. Adjacent to the River Welland and rebuilt at the same time as the Town Bridge was built.
- 5 St Mary's Hill. Former Conservative Club, Stamford. Adjacent to the River Welland.
- Building on corner of Red Lion Square and High Street. 1848. Jacobean style.

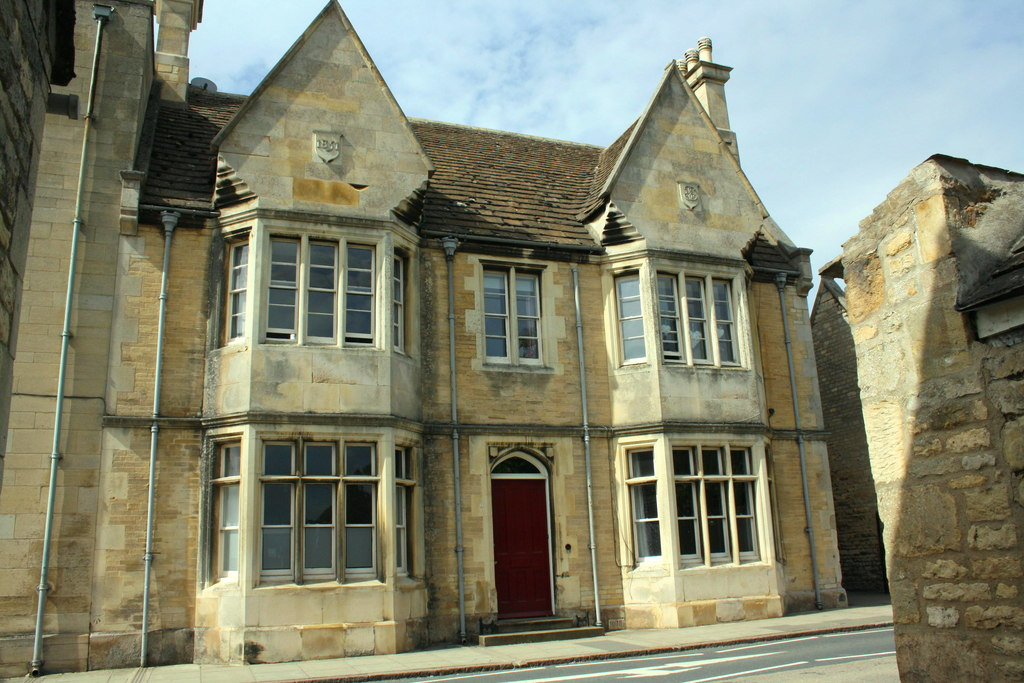
Byard House, 19 St Pauls Street, Stamford 1851

- Byard House. 19 St Paul's Street, Stamford. 1851. Two-storey ashlar house was built in 1851, on the site of a building dating to 1666. It has two full-height bay windows in a 17th-century style, with heavy corbelled gables in a 17th-century style. Now part of Stamford Endowed Schools.
- Midland Bank, Corner of St Mary's Street and St Mary's Hill, Stamford 1848. Three storeys with shaped gables to the attic dormer windows.
- 16 Broad Street, Stamford. The Browning's offices, possibly the work of Edward Browning, c.1855.

=== By himself ===
==== Schools ====
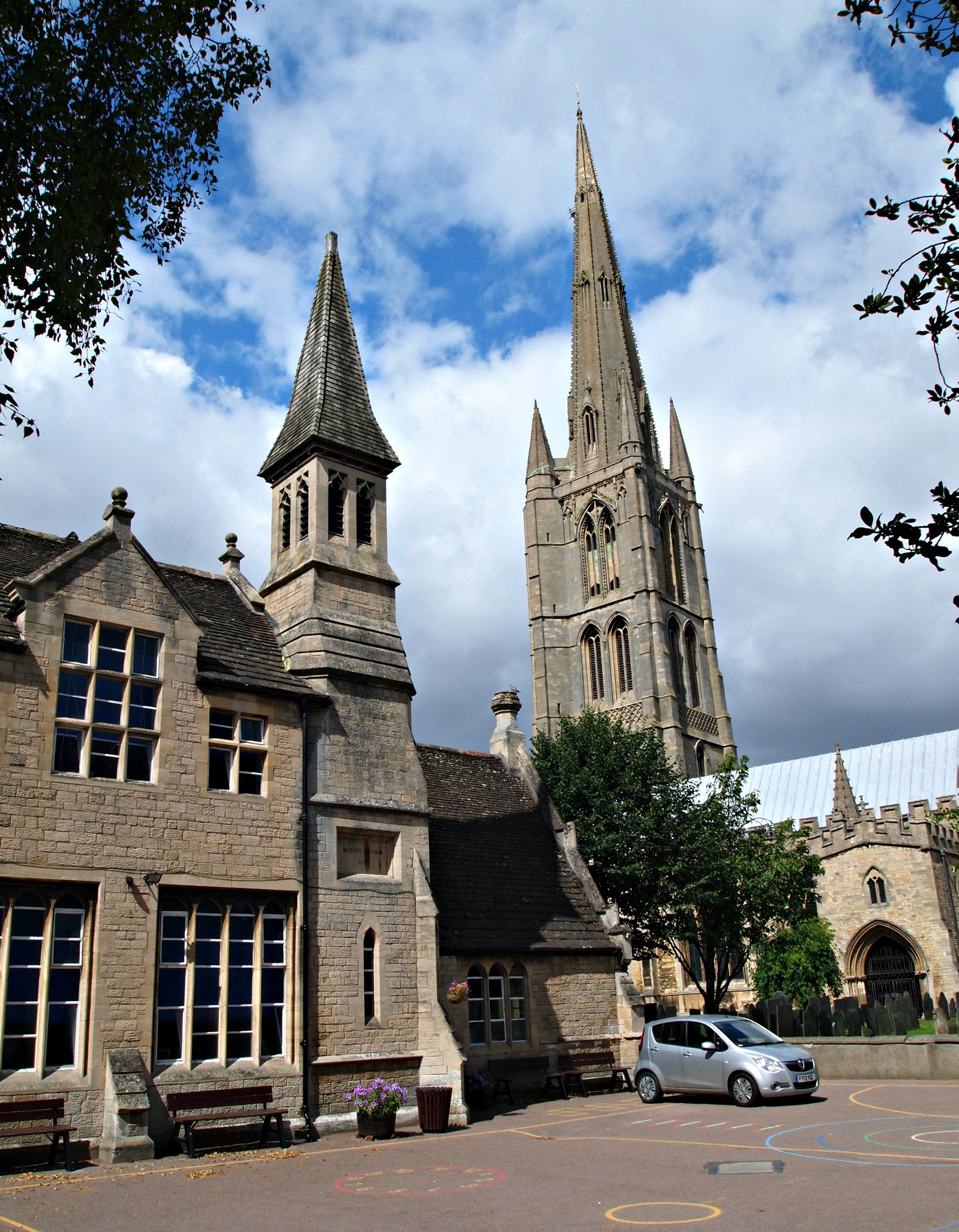
National School and Church, Castlegate, Grantham, Lincs.

- Grantham National School 1858-9

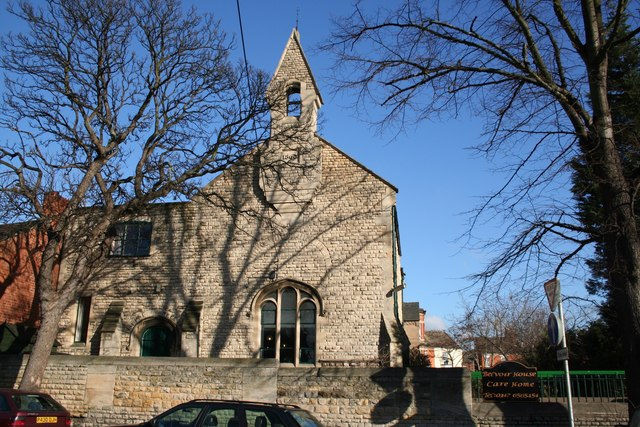
Little Gonerby, Grantham Primary School, 1863

- Little Gonerby National School, Grantham. (1863). Now Belvoir House Care Home. The Stamford Mercury recorded that school was opened on 17 June 1863 and the school had been built through "the munificence of the Hon. & Rev. Rd. Cust" with Edward Browning as architect and John Wilson builder, and "The building will have a stone exterior of very handsome appearance, and will form a very handsome architectural addition to the group of villa residences already built in the neighbourhood. The stone is from the quarries of Mr. Wilson, at Castor, Cambridgeshire".
- Totternhoe Board School, Castle Hill Road, Totternhoe, Bedfordshire. 1867. Built for Marian Lady Alford in memory of her son, the late Lord Brownlow. T-shaped building with school and master's house. Arched windows with decorative brick over windows and banding. To accommodate 140 children. The school was let to Bedfordshire County Council in 1916 when the Lord Brownlow sold the Totternhoe Estate. The school was demolished after 1950.

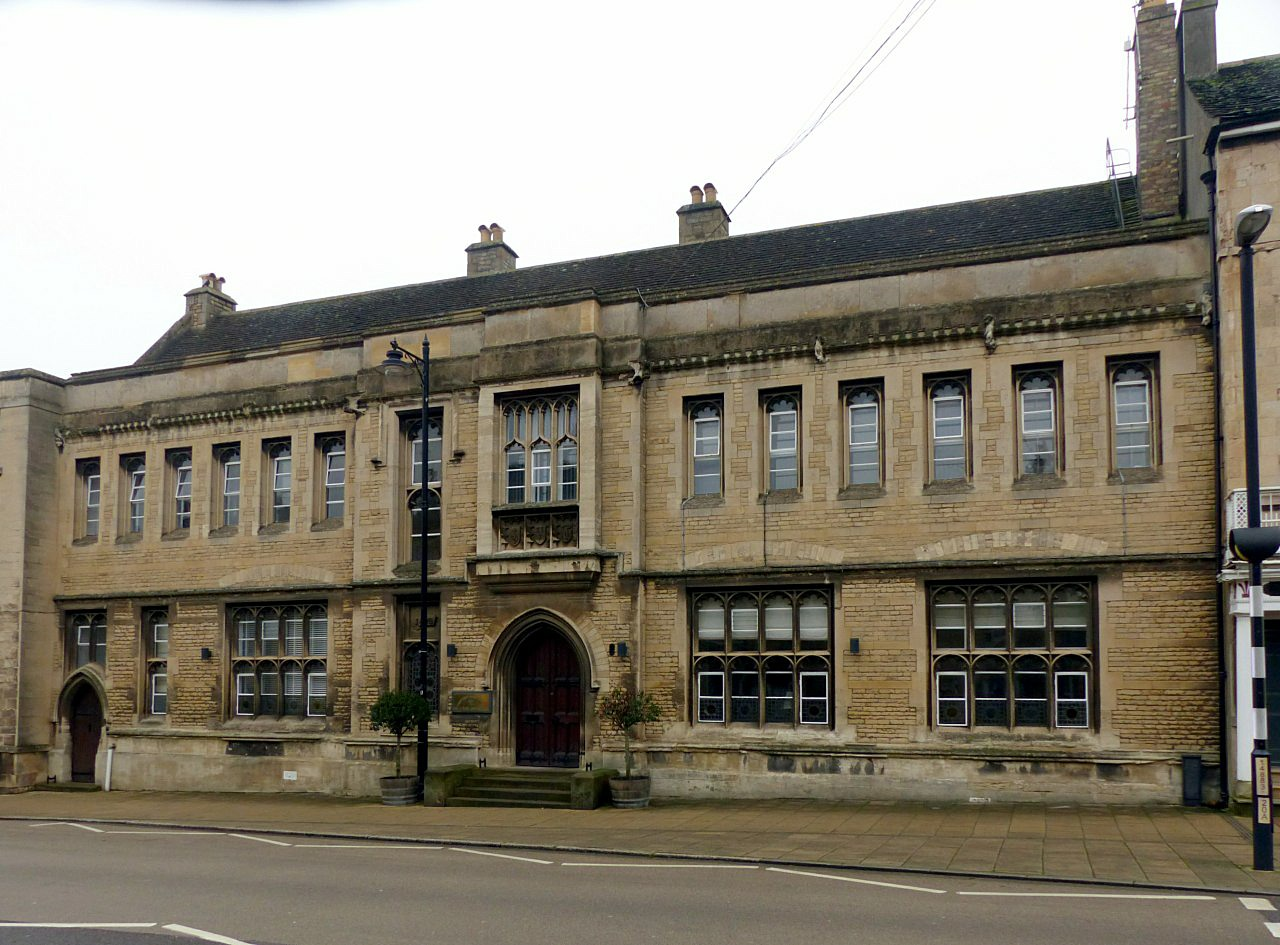
Stamford High School, High Street St Martins, Stamford 1876

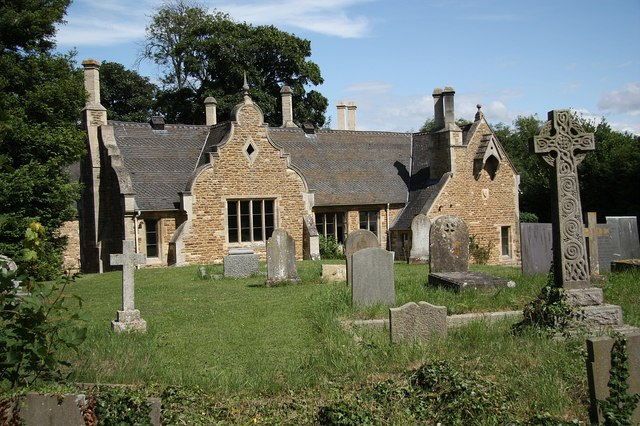
Hough-on-the-Hill School & Schoolhouse 1867

- Hough-on-the-Hill, Old Primary School. 1867. Grade II. School with schoolhouse attached to south. T-plan. Coursed ironstone rubble, ashlar dressings, banded fishscale slate roof. Roofs with iron ridge with small ventilators and three chimney stacks. The school runs to the north at right angles from schoolhouse with an ornate shaped gable and coped chimney. West front has plain sashed window to north, another ornate projection with ornate shaped gable with finial and a large three-mullioned rectangular window with small triangular opening above. Small buttress to south. Cross wing has small buttress and small rectangular window on north side with large ashlar dressed lateral stack with 2 tall chimneys. Pointed doorway to north end of west front of projection. Plaque above with a large 'B' for Brownlow inscribed on shield. Large coped gable on west side, with bell hood.
- Stamford High School High Street St Martin's, Stamford, 1876. With gothic detailing to the first floor windows and the arched entrances, but otherwise with some surprisingly modern characteristics.

==== School attributed to Edward Browning ====
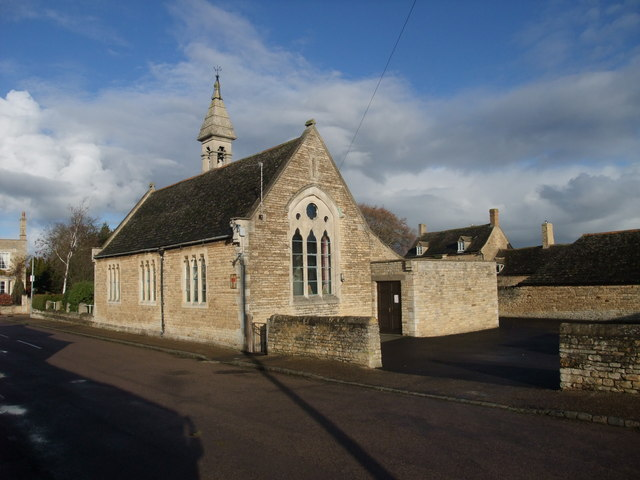
Former school, Easton on the Hill 1867

- New Road, Easton on the Hill Northamptonshire. 1867. Grade II Listing. Now village hall. c.1867. The adjacent master's house could also be by Browning. Single-storey T-shape school. Squared coursed limestone with ashlar dressings with a Collyweston slate roof. On road frontage are three stone mullion windows. Conical ventilator on roof ridge. Elevation to left has gable and with large three light window with plate tracery and cusped-heads Small square tower attached, with a square ashlar cupola, with spirelet, clock face on tower and chiming bell in cupola. The school was originally endowed by Richard Garford in 1670 and rebuilt on the present site in 1867, to include a National School for girls, as well as boys, at a cost of £1,200.

==== Hospital and almshouses ====
- Stamford Hospital, three fever wards designed with Dr William Newman.
- Almshouses 90–100 Church Street, Market Deeping. Listed Grade II. Six almshouses were built in 1877 to designs by Edward Browning of Stamford. They were built following a bequest by Miss Mary Ann Scotney to provide for six Protestant widows or spinsters. Single storey with Collyweston slate roof and ashlar ridge chimney stacks. Squared limestone rubble with ashlar quoins and dressings. Three-sided courtyard plan facing road. Five-bay frontage, the end bays are advanced and separately gabled. In the porch roof is a small two-light dormer window. In the gable ends are similar single windows. The left hand gable has a plaque with "MAS" in raised lettering and the right hand gable the date "1877". Both plaques have draped garlands above.

==== Public buildings ====
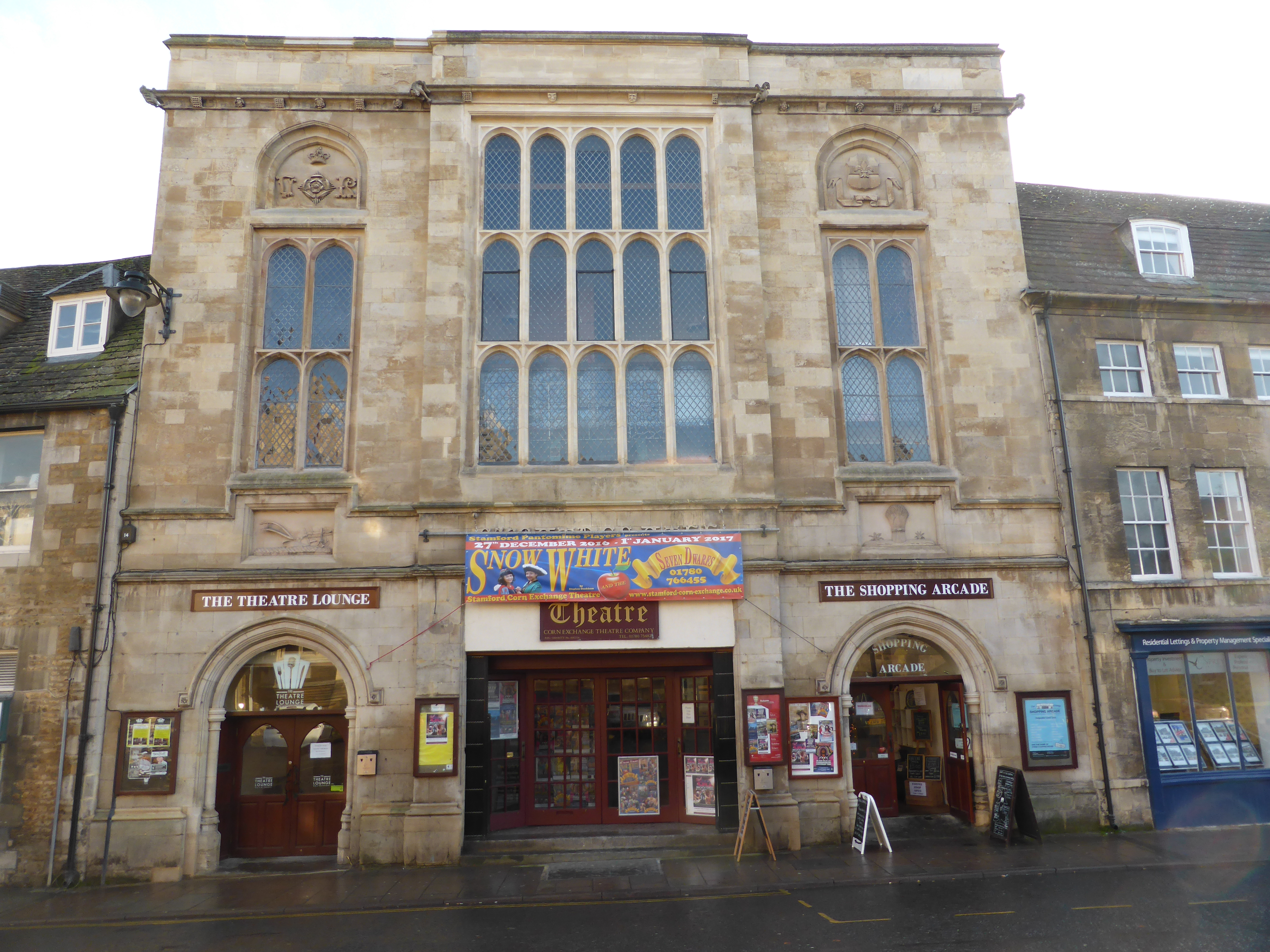
Corn Exchange, Stamford

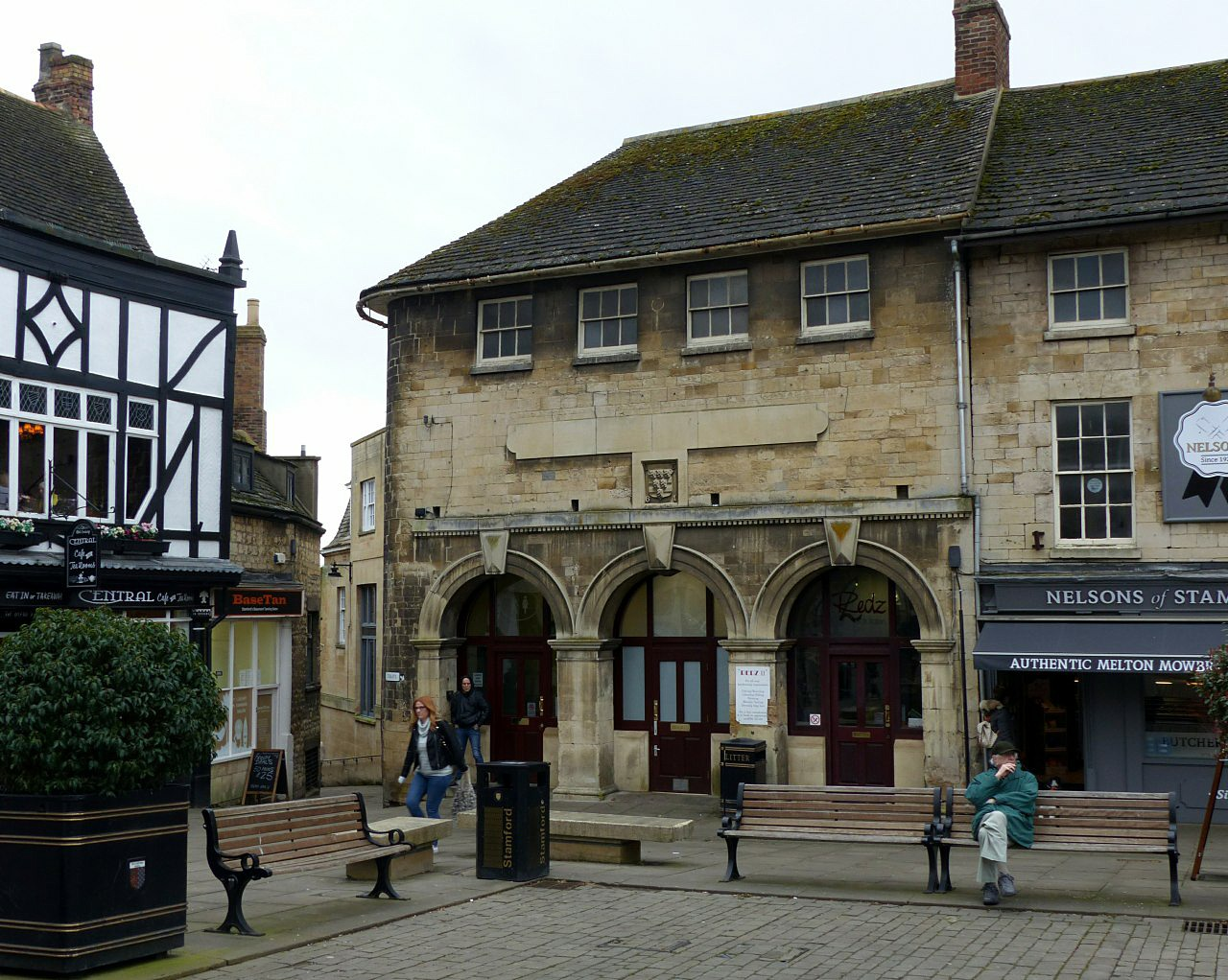
Former buttermarket, Red Lion Square, Stamford

- Corn Exchange, Broad Street, Stamford 1859 Tudor Gothic with a large first-floor window within a shallow projecting bay. Altered after a fire in 1925.
- Buttermarket, Red Lion Square, Stamford 1861. Ashlar with a stone slate roof. Two storeys, Four windows with windows, Coat of arms below label. Small dentil cornice above the three bay round-headed arcade of the former Buttermarket. Moulded arches with keystone. Grade II listed.
- Corn Exchange, Ware, Hertfordshire 1866.

==== Churches ====
===== Bedfordshire =====
- Bletsoe 1858. Restoration of church.
- Dunton. 1861. The tower rebuilt, the south porch was partially rebuilt and the chancel restored.
- Tempsford 1873. Restoration of church.

===== Cambridgeshire =====
- Stilton, 1857
- Holme Church, Cambridgeshire. 1862. The outside of the church rebuilt, but earlier masonry in the interior of the church. Rockfaced with double bellcote. Decorative period tracery.
- Whittlesey, Cambridgeshire. 1858. New roof over south aisle.

===== Essex =====
- St Giles, Langford, Essex. 1880–2. Romanesque church, largely re-built by Browning. New bell turret on the north side of the chancel and a new north aisle, vestry and porch.

===== Hertfordshire =====
- St Helen's Church, Wheathampstead, 1864

===== Lincolnshire =====
- St John the Baptist's Church, Stamford. 1856. Re-ordered the interior for Tractarian or High Church worship. Finely carved pews in the nave to Browning's designs.
- St Martin Barholm 1856
- Langtoft 1859
- St Andrew's Church, Folkingham. In 1860 Edward Browning advertised for tenders from builders for "Taking Down and Re-building the Pillars and Clerestory of the nave of FOLKINGHAM CHURCH with a new nave roof together with other reparations."

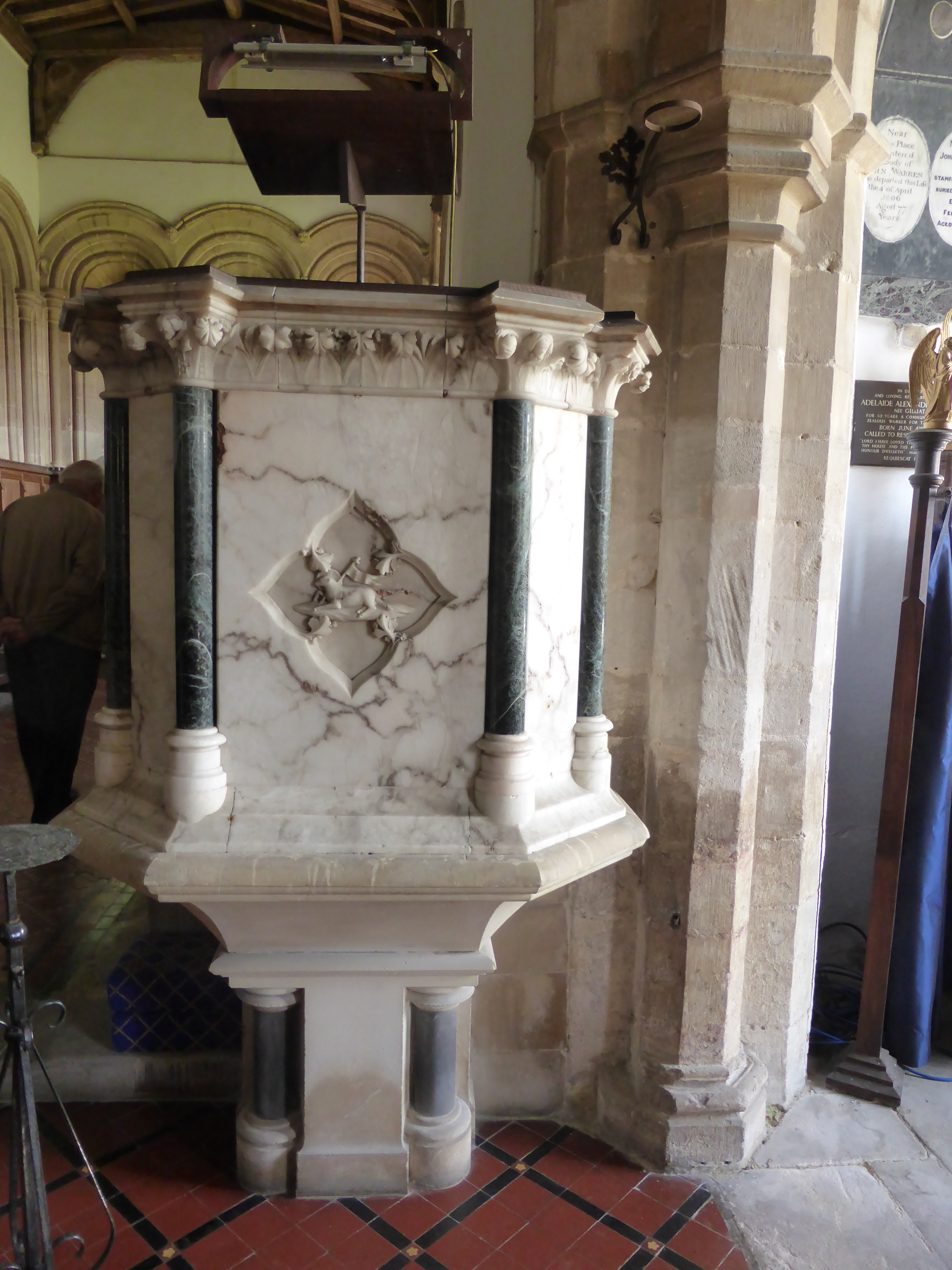
Threekingham, Pulpit by Edward Browning

- St Peter's Church, Threekingham. 1860. Edward Browning undertook a thorough restoration of the church at the cost of about £500. This included cleaning the freestone of the nave, pillars, and arches. The windows of the south aisle were restored as well as the porch with a new opened timber roof. The ancient bench ends of the church were carefully reproduced in English oak as well as new prayer-desk with open tracery front and richly carved book-board, and a new lectern. A pulpit of polished alabaster, with a richly carved cornice of natural and conventional foliage provided.The pulpit is octagonal, with shafts of polished green marble at the intersections : the base and corbel are of Ketton stone, black marble shafts in the centre panel is carved a lamb and banner bearing the cross. The floor of the church was encaustic tiles with glazed bands arranged in a trellis, and square compartments. The recumbent figures of Lambert Trekingham and his wife were partially restored, and set on a plinth plain stone.
- St Mary's Church, Stamford. 1860. Restoration of the chancel.
- St Mary's, Sutterton. 1861–3. Extensively rebuilt, including tower and spire, but the overall earlier appearance of the medieval church has been retained.
- St John the Baptist, Claydike Bank, Amber Hill, Lincolnshire. 1867. Red brick with polygonal apse, bellcote. Lancet windows . Decorative interior with yellow brick with red dado and black band and naturalistic foliage cut in red brick. The church was made redundant in February 1995 and was sold in April 1998 for conversion into a private home.
- All Saints' Church, Fosdyke
- St Andrew, Sempringham. 1868–9. Apsed chancel added and the north aisle wall extended to cover the area of the former transept.
- All Saints' Church, Snelland 1862 for the Cust family.

===== Northamptonshire =====
- Duddington St Mary, 1844
- King's Cliffe. (1853) Church restored.
- St Helen's Church, Sibbertoft. Extensively restored in 1864. According to the Lincolnshire Chronicle a '"new south aisle and porch have been built, the aisle being divided from the church by an arcade of three arches, springing from elaborate carved caps. The old west gallery has been taken away, and the tower arch opened, the effect, as usual, adding greatly to the appearance of the church. The north aisle has been extended eastwards, the vestry being divided from it by an oak screen, the upper panels of which are perforated by quatrefoils. The nave divided from the chancel oak screen, with tracery and carved heads. The pavement throughout, except the north aisle and vestry, is composed of Minton's tiles, of various elegant patterns, from designs expressly made by the Rev. Lord Alwyne Compton."
- St Leonard Rockingham, 1870

===== Nottinghamshire =====
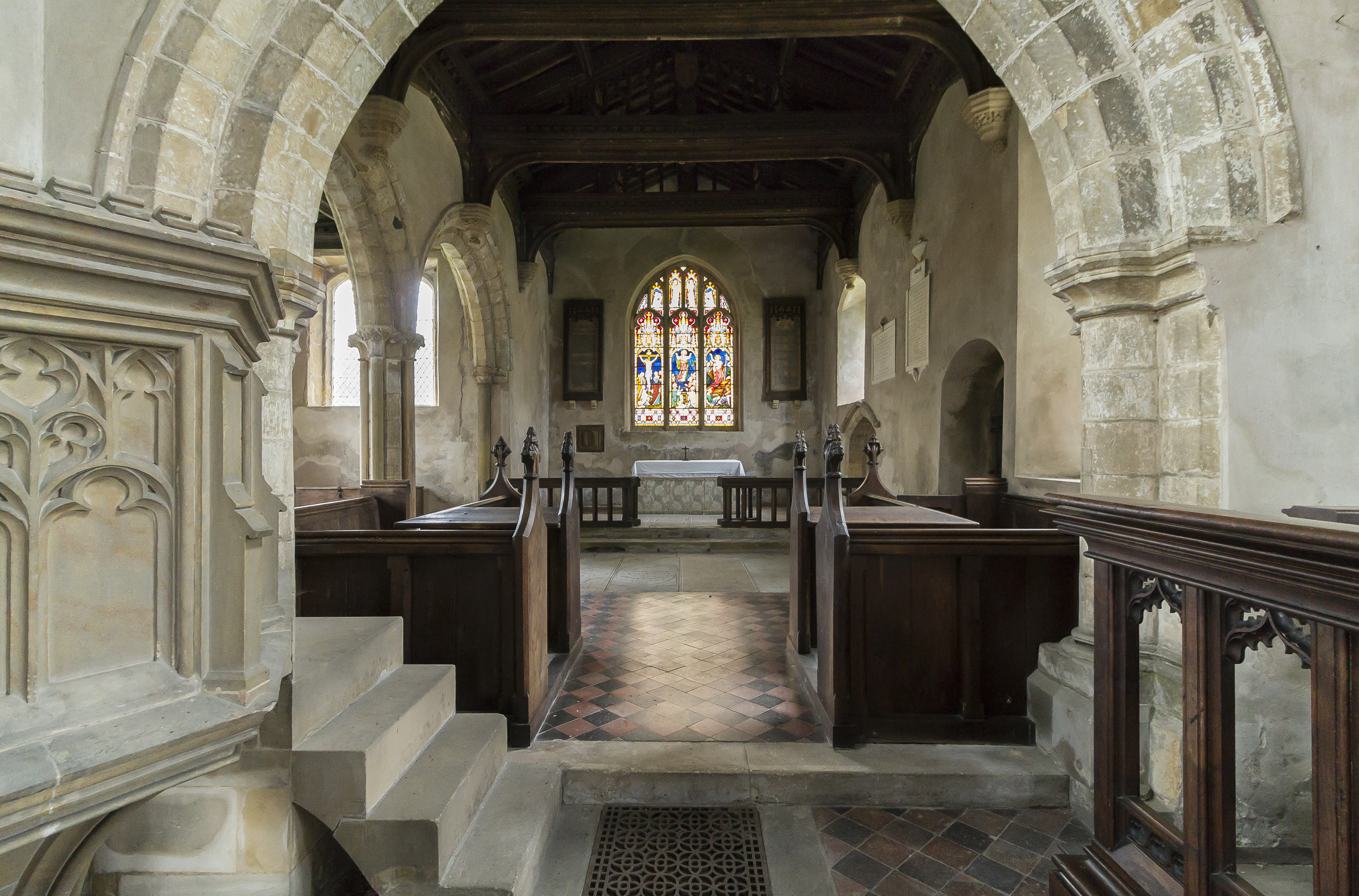
Chancel, St Wilfred's Church, Low Marnham showing furnishings

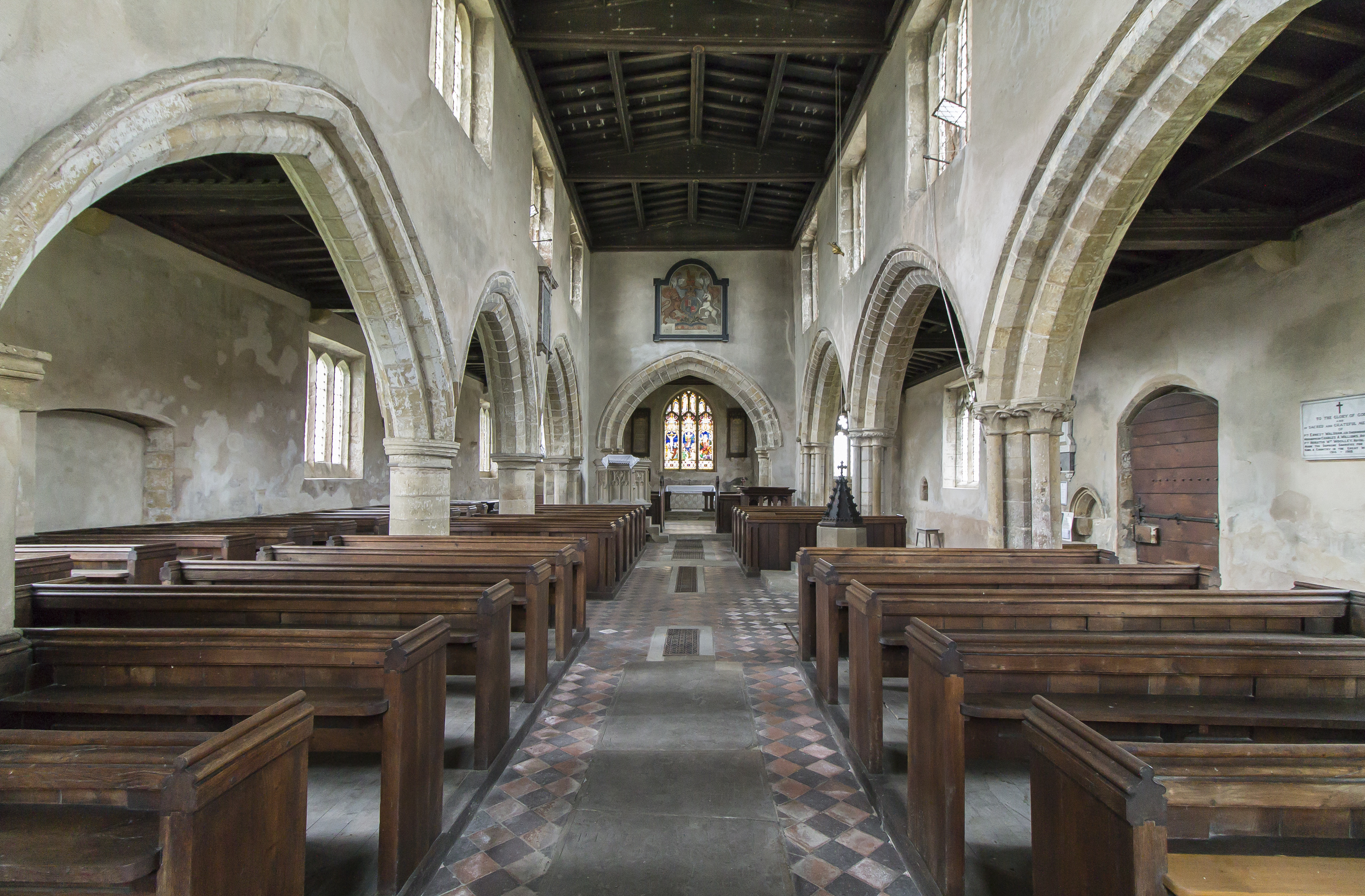
St Wilfred's interior showing nave furnishings and font

- St Wilfred's, Marnham. (1847) The Lincolnshire Chronicle reported that the Nave and chancel has been thorougly repaired, and fitted with neat stalls at great expense, the cost of the noble proprietor of the parish (Lord Brownlow) and that The roof is completely new, so also are the open seats, which are solid oak, and, although simple design, are very convenient and suited to the church; the pavement is of red and black tiles; the reading-desk is handsomely carved, and the pulpit, of stone, is very elegant and the font, plain design

==== Rutland ====
- St Mary's Church, Morcott. 1874.

===== Churches gallery =====
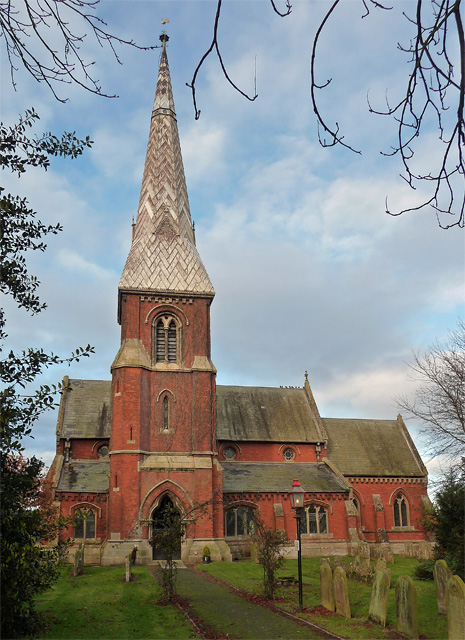
All Saints', Fosdyke 1871–2

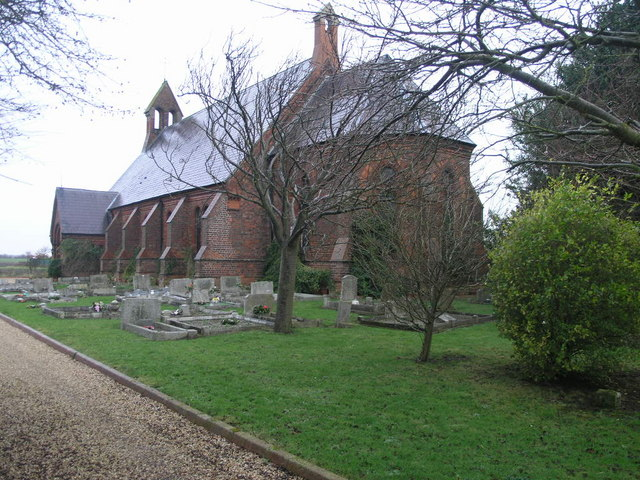
Amber Hill, Lincolnshire

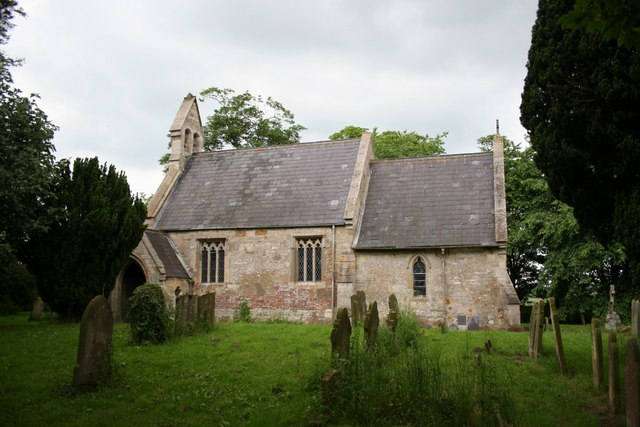
All Saints', Snelland, 1863

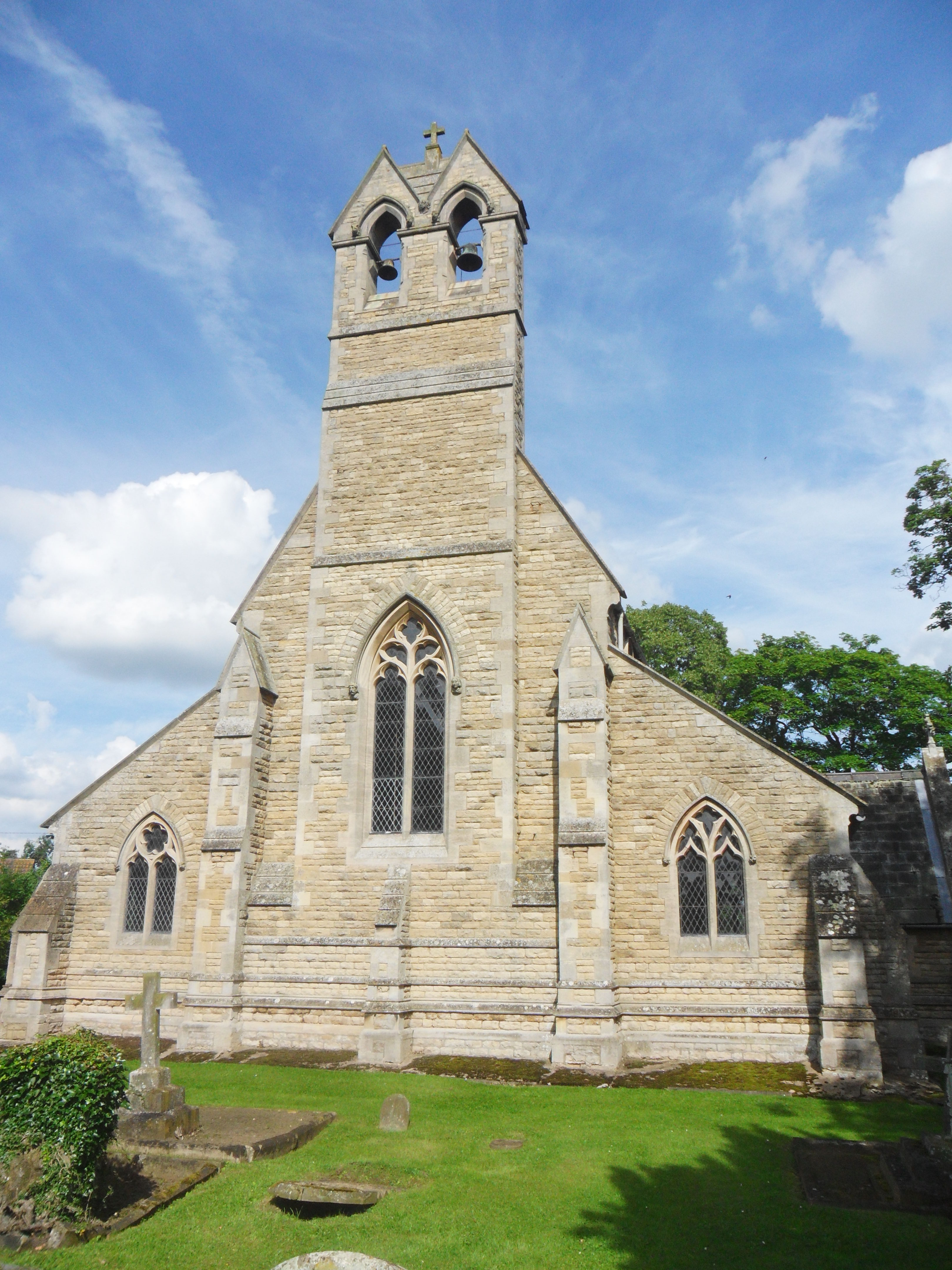
St Giles, Holme Cambridgeshire

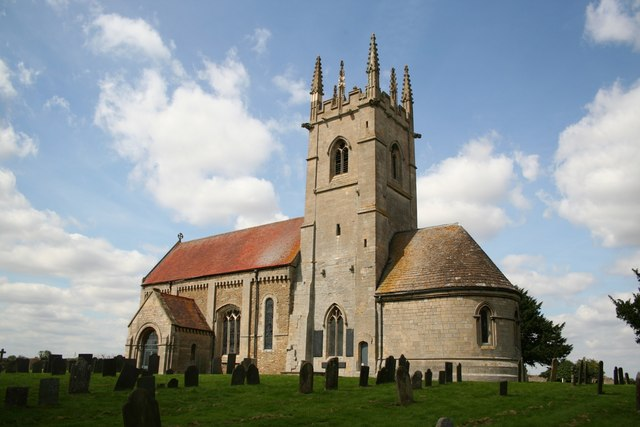
St Andrew's Church, Sempringham

==== Country houses ====
- Apethorpe Palace, Northamptonshire. Edward Browning"s father Bryan Browning had undertaken a scheme of work for the Earl of Westmorland on the south wing of the Palace and this was continued by Edward with alterations to the loggia and the insertion of a neo-Jacobean staircase.

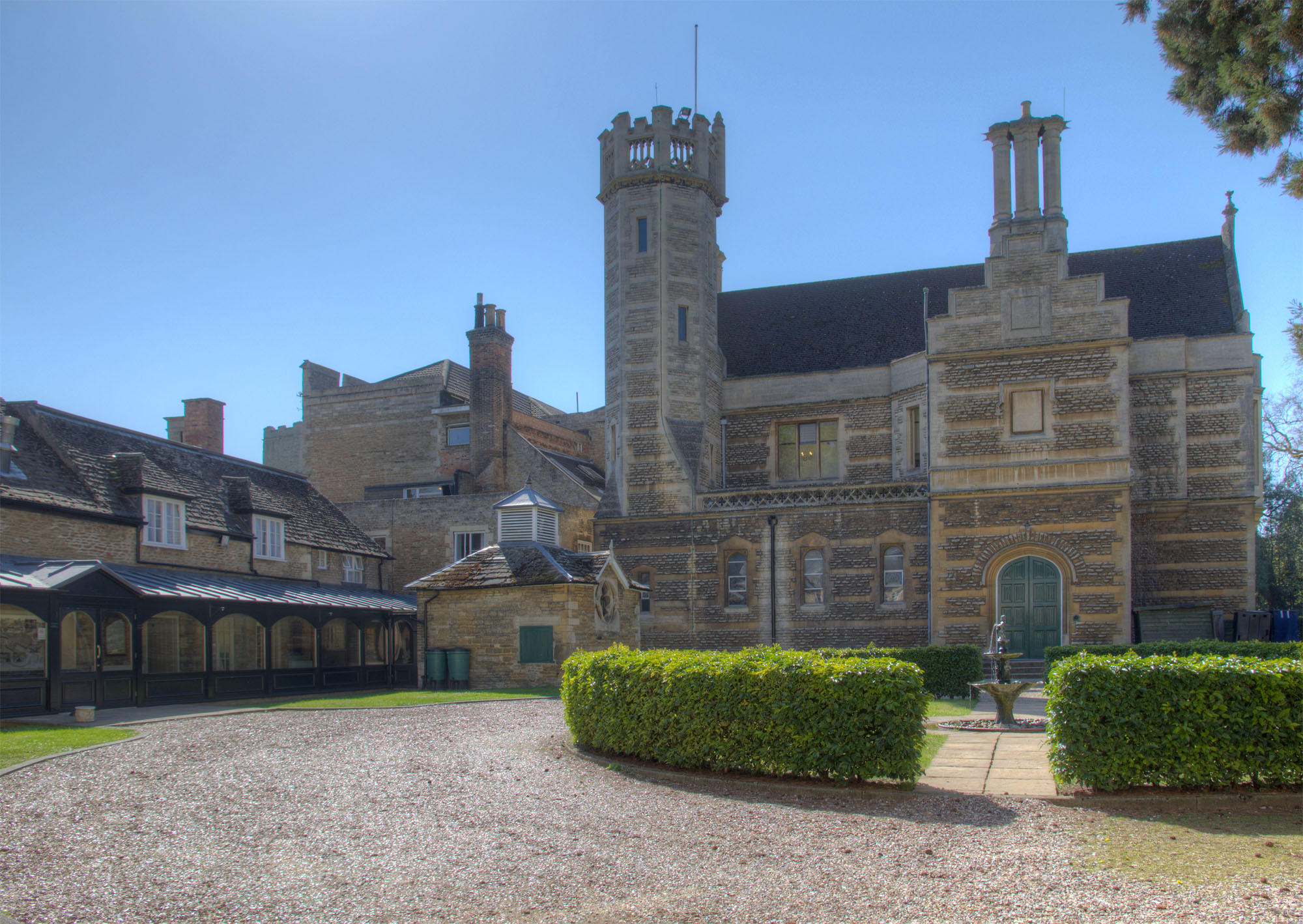
Orton Hall, Orton Longueville 1860-1

- Orton Hall, Orton Longueville, Peterborough. 1860–1. West Wing of Orton Hall, extension of the Hall built for the Marquis of Huntly The west wing added in 1861 is two storeys and attic, rock faced masonry with bands of ashlar, plain parapet and steeply pitched tiled roof with gabled end, large two storey bay on south side with decorative parapet and oriel in gable. On the north side is an octagonal tower with open work parapet with battlements and a large porch with stepped gable. An impressive frontage with alternative use of ashlar limestone and rough stone banding which is a feature of Browning's work. Browning also constructed a mortuary chapel for the Maquis of Huntley.

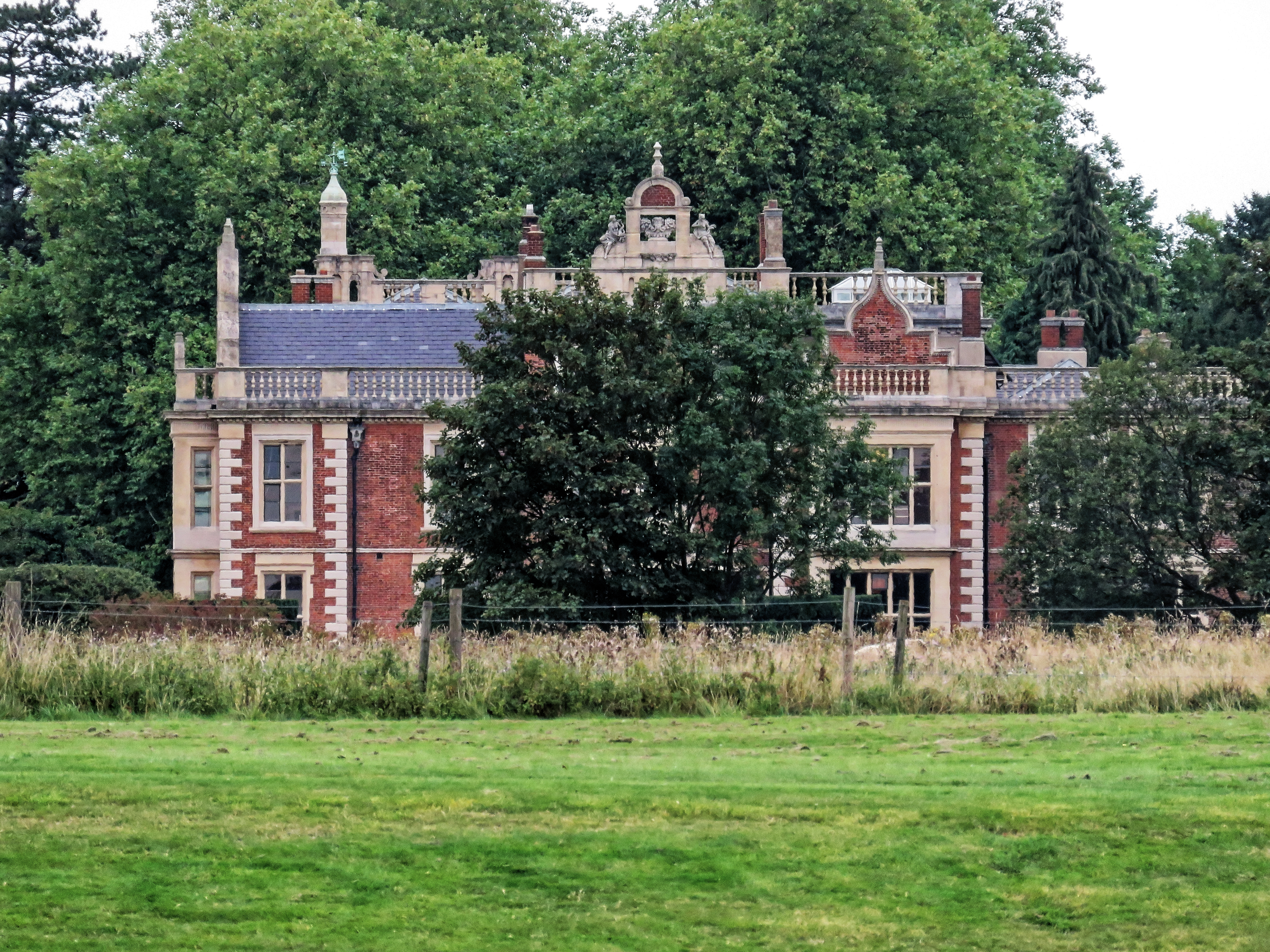
Barrington Hall, Hatfield Broad Oak, Essex

- Barrington Hall, Essex (Hatfield Broad Oak).1863 The original house was built in 1734. In 1863 Browning redesigned the facade in a Jacobethan style. Red brick with stone dressings. The ground floor of the west front has smooth rusticated masonry and the parapet has elaborate arched pillared corners with octagonal turrets. There are a number of ornamental shaped Dutch gables. The centre block of the south front has a centre piece with carved figures. The casement windows are varied in size and proportion, with stone transom, mullions and architraves.
- Millwood Manor, Dalton in Furness, Cumbria. 1860. A large house built for the Duke of Buccleuch, who had his main residence at Broughton House in Northamptonshire. It was occupied initially by William Wadham, who was the Duke's agent. Wadham and Browning advertised for tenders for building the House with offices and a lodge. The Lodge appears to be listed but the Millwood Manor does not appear to be.

==== Houses ====
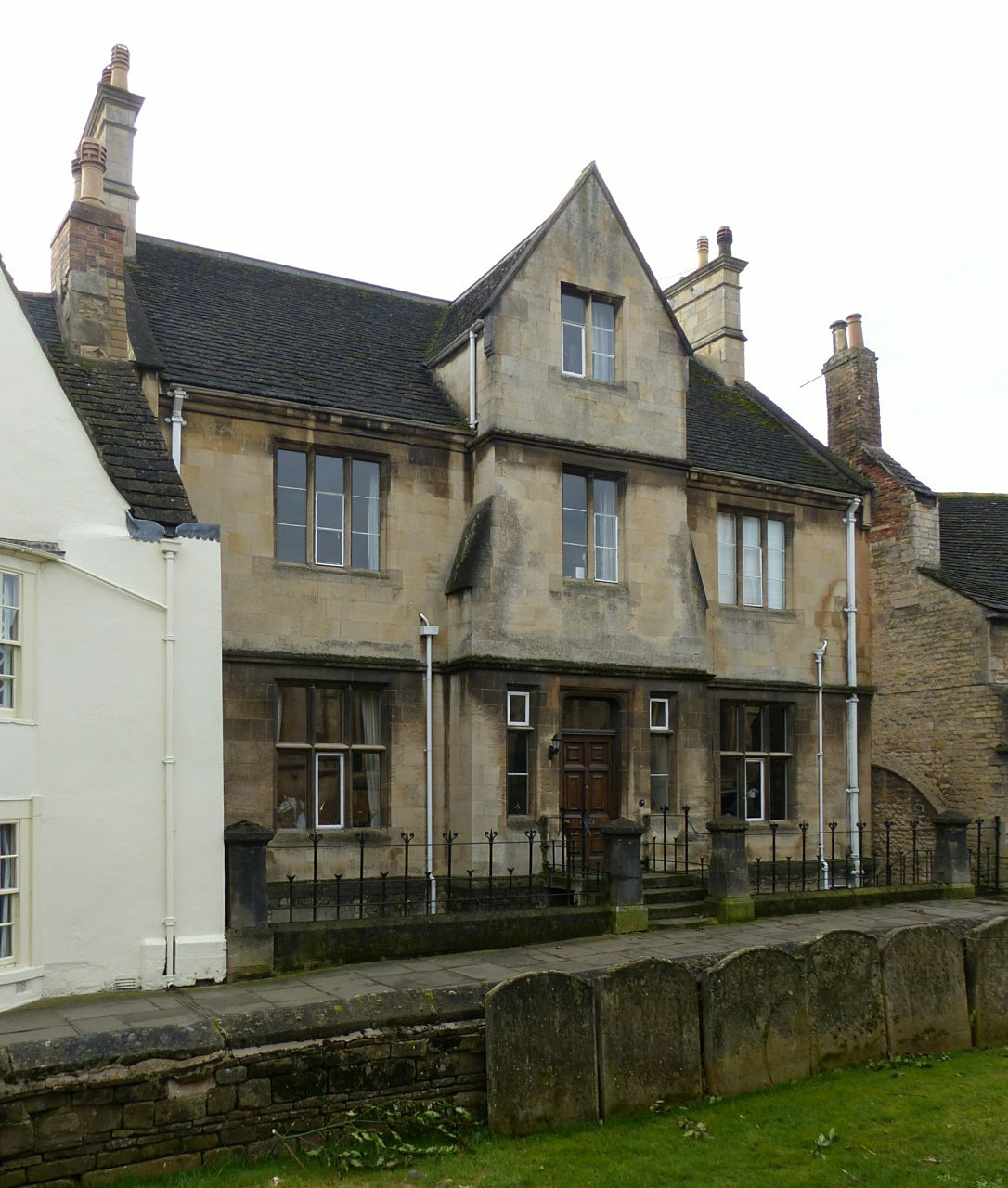
16 St George's Square, Stamford

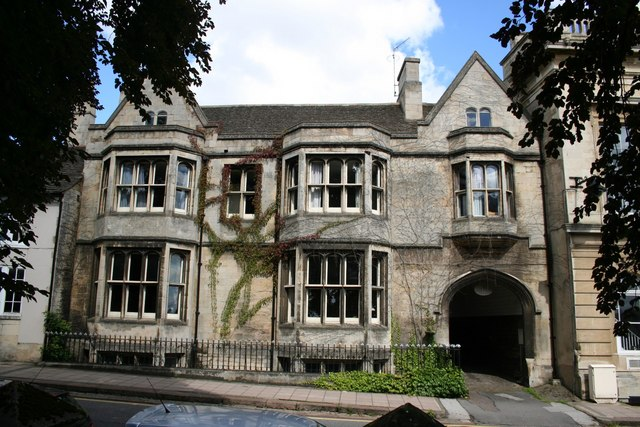
All Saints' Vicarage, Stamford, 1855

- All Saints' Vicarage, 8 St Peter's Hill, 1855.
- No 16 Cornmarket, Stamford
- Amber Hill rectory
- 16 St George's Square, Stamford. Former St George's rectory, Stamford
- Creeton old rectory
- The Tower House, St Peter's Hill, Stamford.
- Bishop's Palace, Peterborough. Alterations including a new kitchen and cellarage.

===== Houses at the First Drift and Second Drift, Wothorpe =====
- The Elms (formerly Priory College), First Drift, Wothorpe, on the outskirts of Stamford. 1850s and apparently by Browning for himself. Large Gothic style house with some re-used medieval fragments. Collyweston slate roof. Asymmetrical and gabled frontage. Two storeys. To the right is a gable incorporated into a stair tower with shouldered lancets, first floor stone Gothic oriel window and a Romanesque doorway. Set back is a Perpendicular traceried window. Stone mullioned windows, some of which are re-used medieval traceried windows. Inside the hall, vestibule and library have coffered timber ceilings. The hall has a dado with re-used medieval traceried panels and a frieze (15th century) a Jacobean style screen and a staircase with twisted balusters. In the library are fine carved medieval (and 16th century ?) panels and pilasters reworked into Victorian panelling, and stencilled walls.

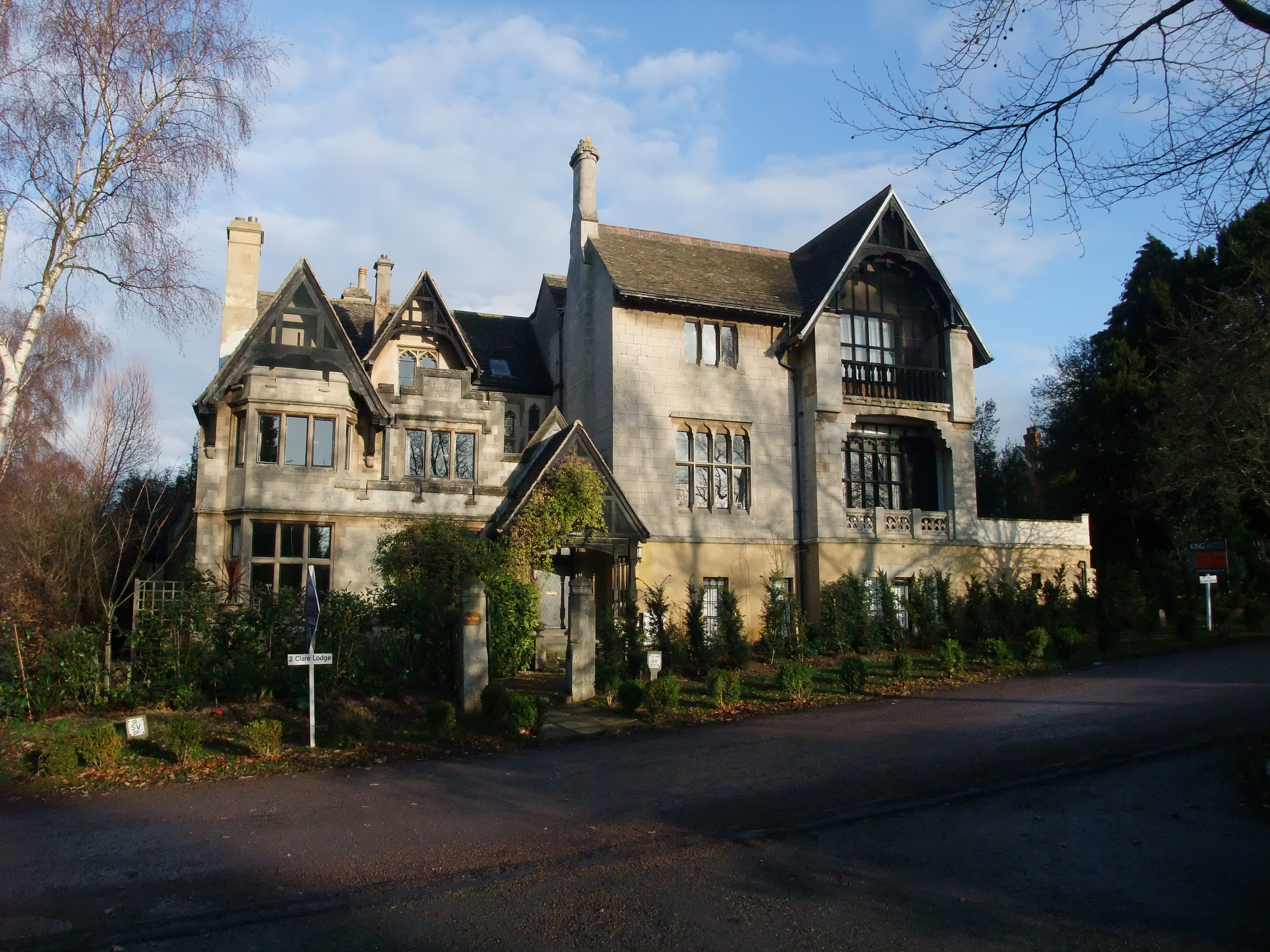
Clare Lodge, Wothorpe

- Clare Lodge, Wothorpe, First Drift Kettering Road, Stamford. c1870. House also built by Browning for himself. Asymmetrical Tudoresque villa with overhanging arch-braced wooden gables, imitating some French vernacular architecture. Stone balustrade with a big fleur-de-lis pattern.
- Wothorpe House, Second Drift, Kettering Road, Wothorpe. Grade II listed. Circa 1860–70. Two storey house with five gabled bays . The bays are asymmetrically arranged with arched braced timber-framed gables on brackets supported on corbel heads. Steeply pitched Collyweston slate roofs with stone chimney stacks with slits between the square shafts. The north-west front is rock faced stone with freestone dressings. The right hand slightly advanced gable, the ground floor has a square bay with cusped arch lights and wide eaves on brackets, above is a window with three shouldered arch window lights. Central attic semi-dormer with gable on brackets. Left hand, porch with diagonal angle buttresses with set-offs. Moulded arched doorway with Burghley arms above, and first floor Gothic traceried two light window. The south-west garden front has advanced right hand twin gables with oriel and ground floor canted bay with square first floor bay rising from a hipped roof. Inside in the hall is a fireplace with corbelled stone hood; moulded ceiling beams with arched braces on corbels and chamfered joists. The open-well staircase has Gothic traceried balusters.

==== Shop ====
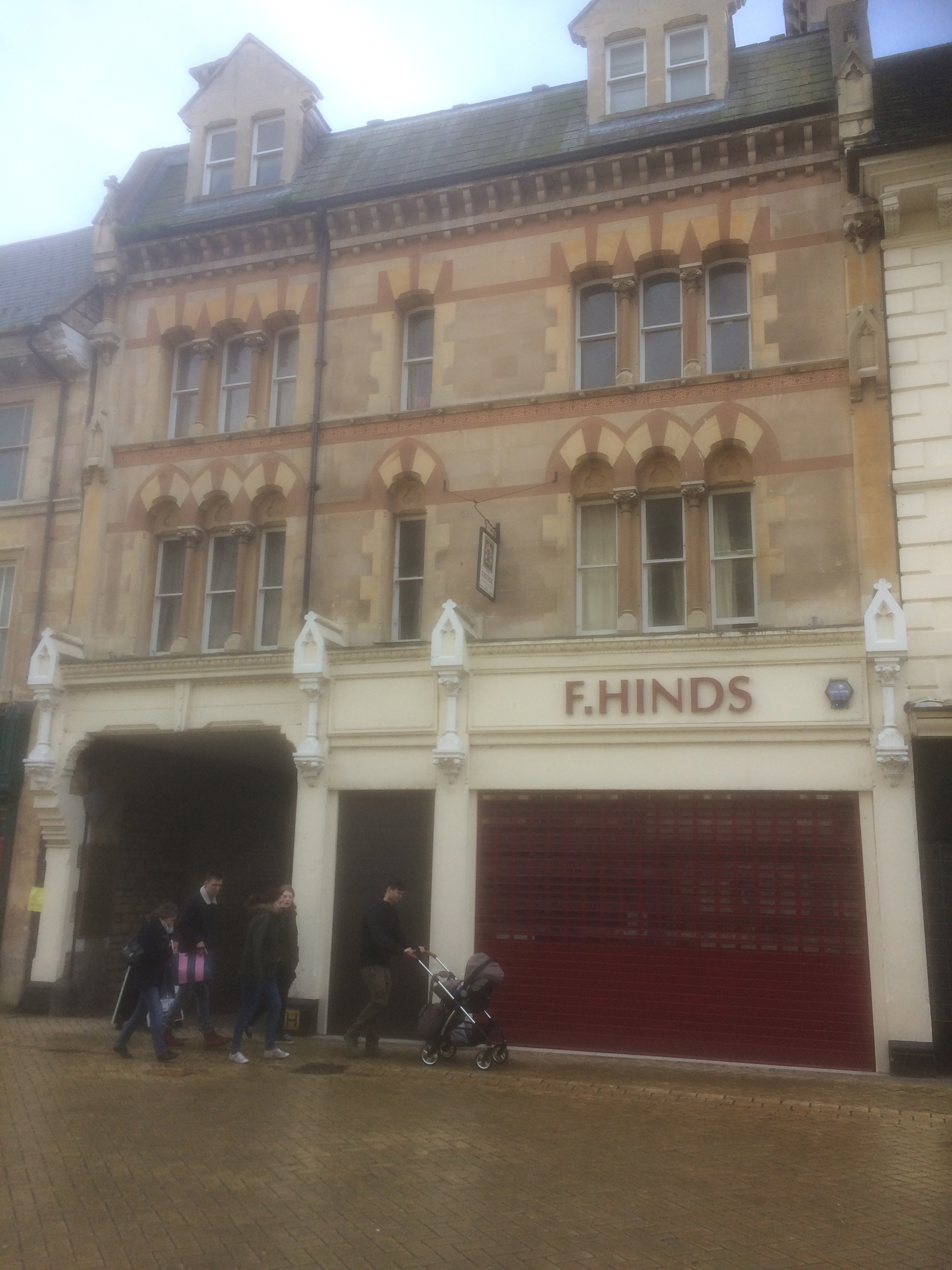
Albert House, 58 High Street, Stamford

- Albert House, 58 High Street, Stamford. An example of Ruskinian Gothic using contrasting coloured stone.

==== Drinking fountain ====
- Drinking fountain, Bourne, Lincolnshire, 1860. Originally in the Market Place, Canopied gothic. Now moved to the Cemetery. The memorial drinking fountain was erected to celebrate the life of John Lely Ostler (1811–59) now Grade II listed and restored by the town council at a cost of £9,000

==== Cemeteries ====
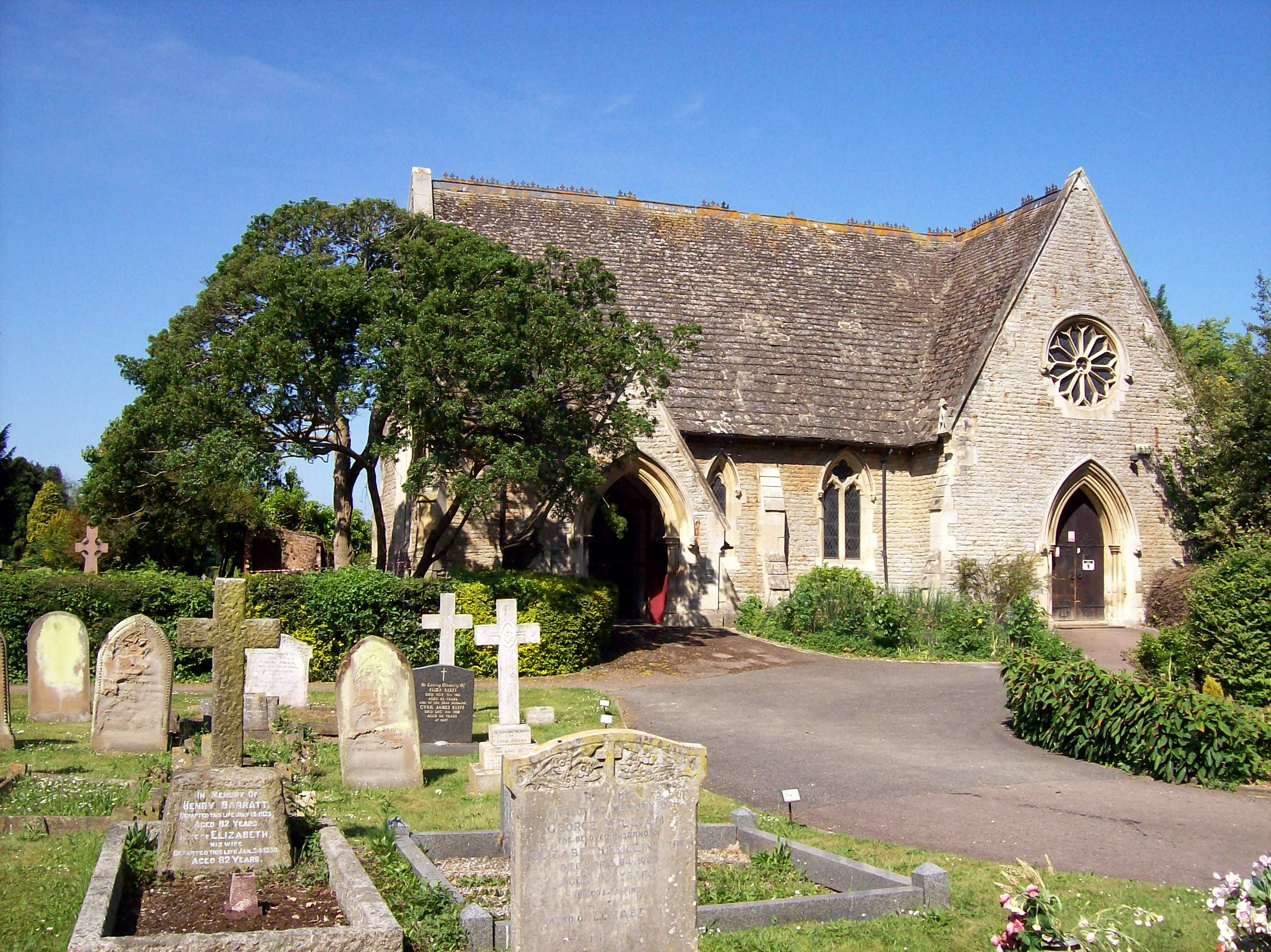
The Victorian chapel in the cemetery at Bourne, Lincolnshire

- Bourne Chapel of Rest. 1855. Two Gothic chapels in a single T-plan building.

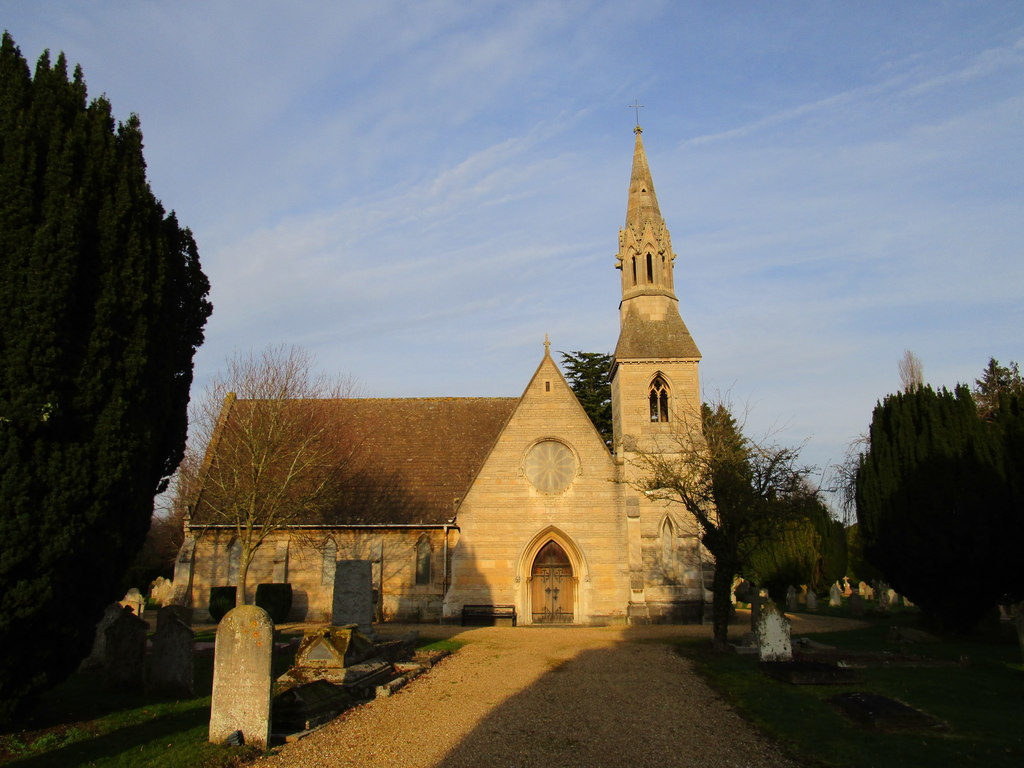
Cemetery chapel, Stamford

- Stamford cemetery chapel, Casterton Road, Stamford 1855. Substantial chapel with tower and pyramid spire rising to an octagonal bell stage and further spirelet. Trefoiled lancets and tracery. The matching cemetery lodge is presumably also to the designs of Browning.

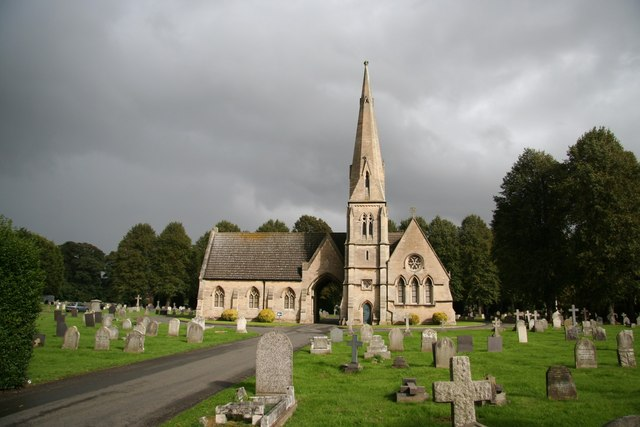
Cemetery Chapel, Grantham

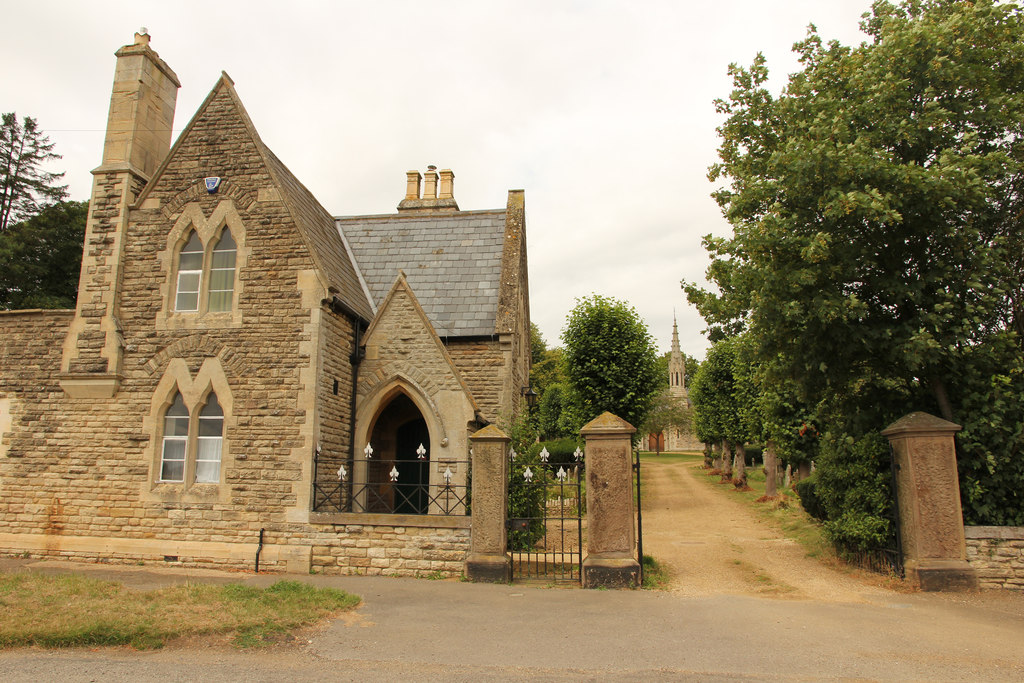
Cemetery Lodge, Oundle

- Grantham Cemetery, Harrowby Road. 1856–7. Grantham Burial Board advertised for tenders for "the Erection of Two CHAPELS (united), with a LODGE and ENTRANCE GATES, on the Cemetery Ground, situate in Harrowby and Somerby". Pevsner remarks "a substantial pair of chapels nicely grouped either side of an arch surmounted by a steeple, one correctly orientated, the other facing north."
- Cemetery Chapel and Gate Lodge, Oundle. In 1859 Browning advertised for Builders desirous of TENDERING for the ERECTION of these Chapels, together with a Lodge, Entrance gates, and Front Fence

== Literature ==
- Antram N (revised), Pevsner, N. & Harris J, (1989), The Buildings of England: Lincolnshire, Yale University Press.
- Antonia Brodie (ed), Directory of British Architects, 1834–1914: 2 Vols, British Architectural Library, Royal Institute of British Architects, 2001, Vol 1, pg. 281.
- Colvin H. A (1995), Biographical Dictionary of British Architects 1600–1840. Yale University Press, 3rd edition London, pg.172.
- Lee S and Orpin J (2016) The Brownings – Architects of Stamford. Stamford Living, August 2016
