= All Saints' Church, Stamford =

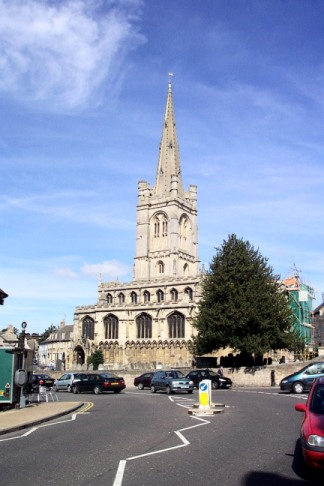
- All Saints' Church, Stamford
- All Saints' Church, Stamford
- 52°39′08″N 00°28′52″W
- Denomination: Church of England
- Churchmanship: Broad Church
- Website: www.stamfordallsaints.org.uk

History
- Dedication: All Saints

Administration
- Province: Province of Canterbury
- Diocese: Diocese of Lincoln
- Archdeaconry: Boston
- Deanery: Stamford
- Parish: Stamford All Saints with St John the Baptist

Clergy
- Rector: The Rev. Neil Shaw

All Saints' Church, Stamford is an historic parish church, of the Church of England, in Stamford, Lincolnshire, England. It is a Grade I listed building. It is on the north side of Red Lion Square.

== History ==
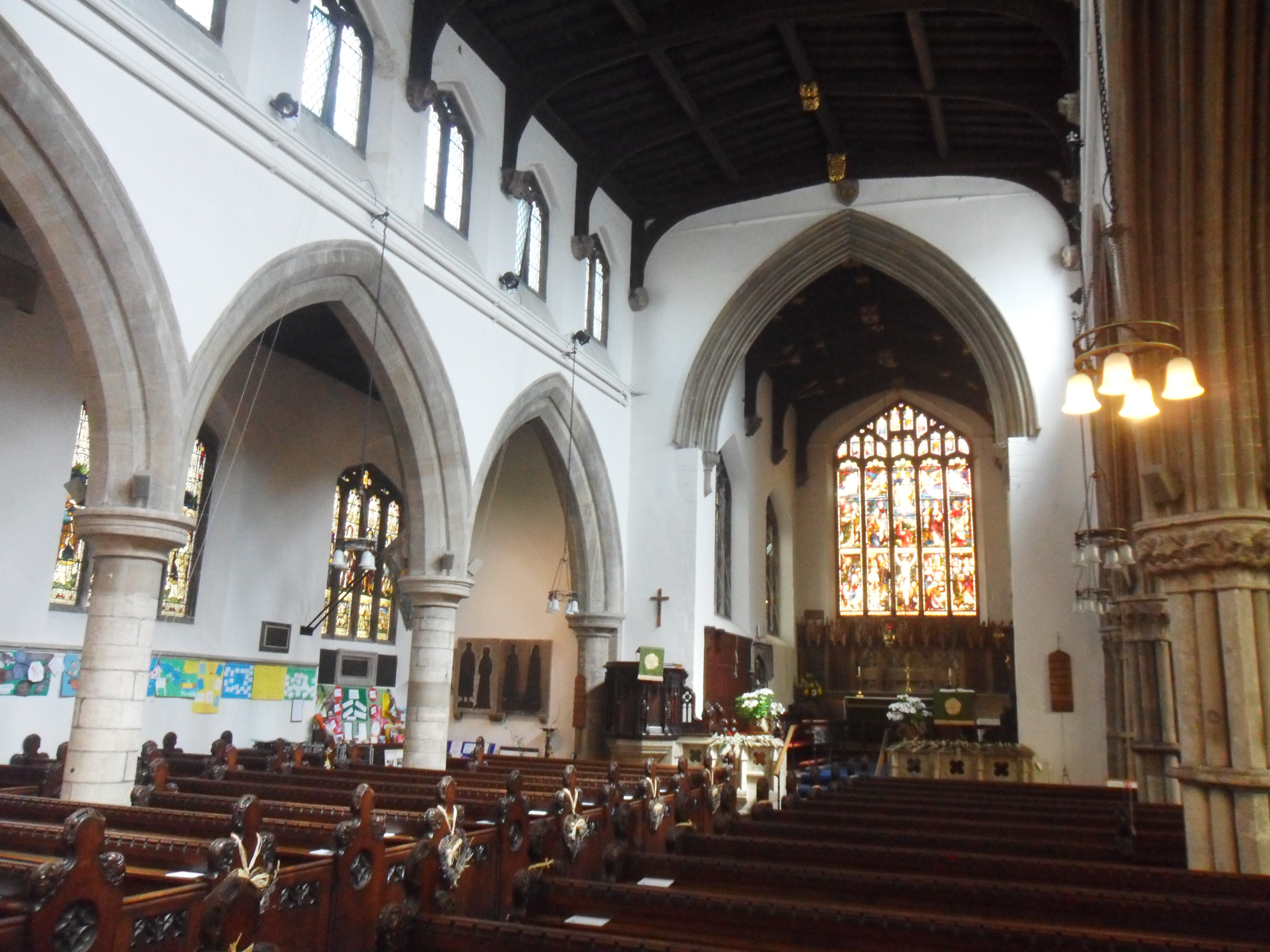
Interior of All Saints' Church looking northeast

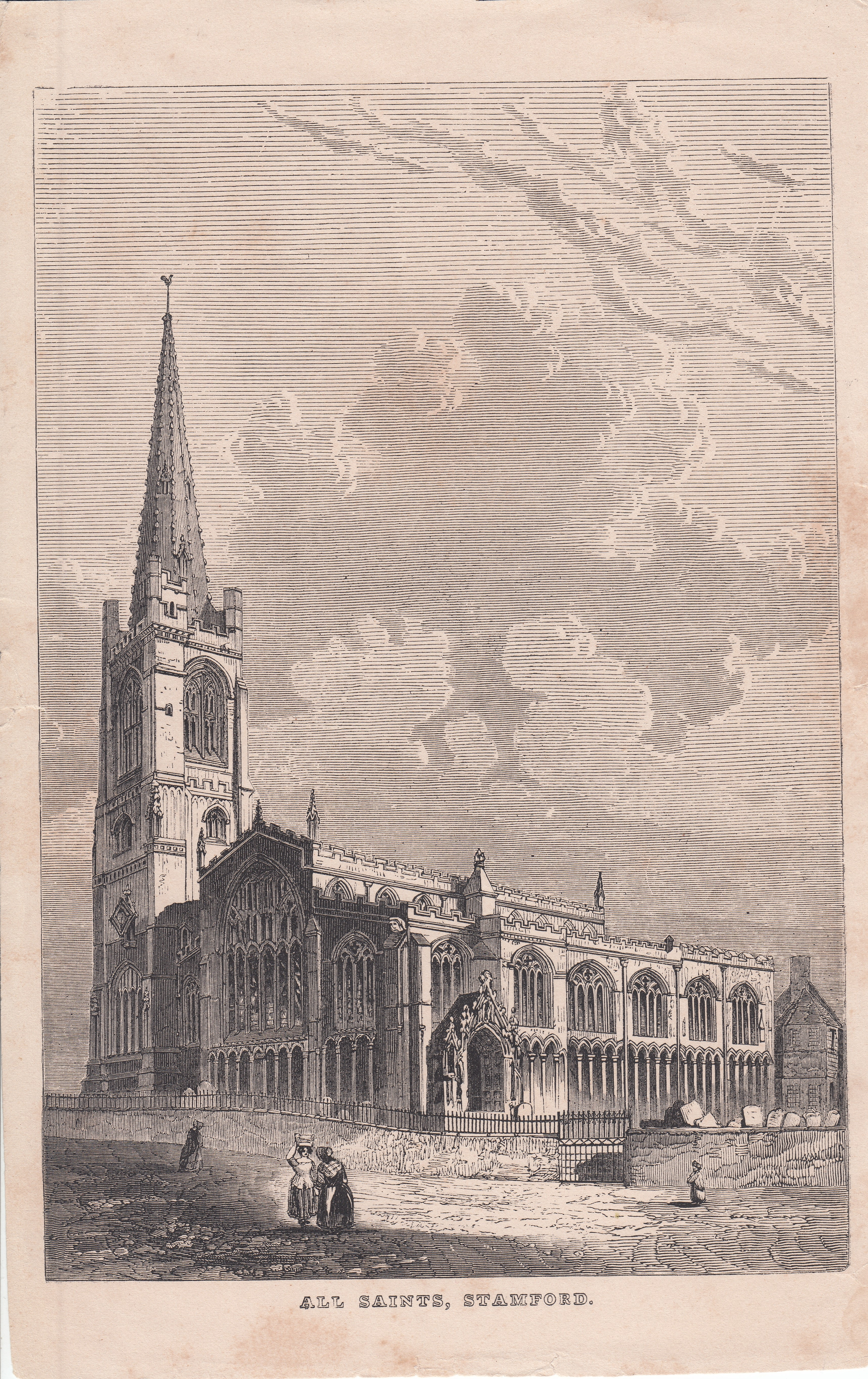
Colour Book Plate of All Saints' Church, 19th century

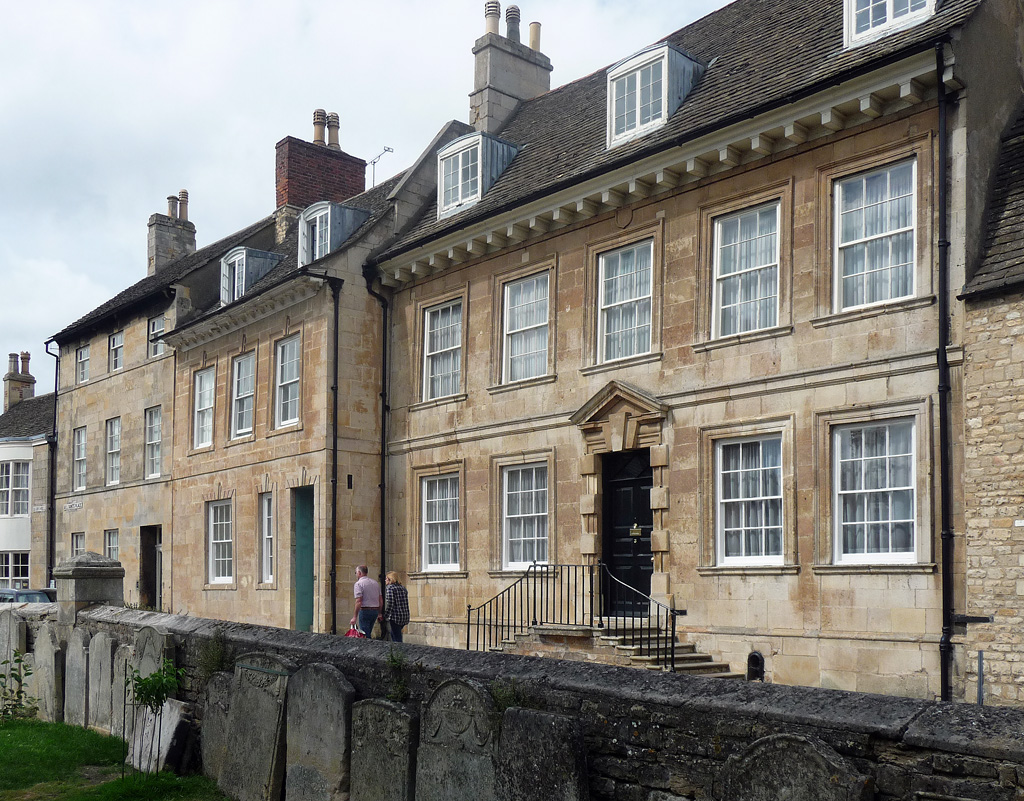
1-3 All Saints Place (the full houses shown left to right), Stamford, which was described by the renowned architectural historian Nikolaus Pevsner as the 'visual hub' of Stamford

A central church at Stamford is mentioned in the Domesday Book, but none of it remains. All Saints' Church has a small amount of 12th-century stonework, but the majority of its construction dates from the 13th century, including its exterior blind arcading, which is an unusual feature for a parish church.

Extensive additions to the church were made by the Browne family in the 15th century. John Browne, a Merchant of the Staple of Calais, funded 15th-century additions: and his son, William, Mayor of the Calais Staple, funded the construction of the church's steeple. The late-15th-century work is of "considerable inventiveness" in its use of architectural details such as ornamental battlements. Only members of the Browne family are buried inside the church.

The archaeologist and antiquary William Stukeley was vicar of All Saints' Church from 1730 to 1747.

Its parish includes St John the Baptist's Church which was declared redundant in 2003.

The adjacent All Saints' Place (which is named after the church and constitutes the base of Barn Hill) was described by the renowned architectural historian Nikolaus Pevsner as the 'visual hub' of Stamford.

== Organ ==
Its 1890 William Hill & Sons organ was rebuilt in 1916 by James Jepson Binns.

=== Organists ===
- Frederick Ries Barratt, 1837 – 1840
- Mr Shearman, until 1847
- Miss Burton, from 1847
- Frank Ketcher, until 1883 (afterwards organist of St Deiniol's Church, Hawarden)
- George Fletcher, 1883 – 1885
- Haydon Hare, 1885 – 1895 (afterwards organist of St Nicholas' Church, Great Yarmouth)
- Bertie Hare, 1895 – 1907
- Mr. Murrell, from 1907 (formerly organist at Ramsey)
- T. Robins, 1929 – 1940 (afterwards organist at Chagford, Devon)
- Wilfred A. Stevens, 1929 – 1940 (formerly assistant organist at Peterborough Cathedral, afterwards organist of St John's Peterborough)
- Albert T. C. Hill, 1940 – 1962 (formerly organist at Bourne Abbey)
- Harold Harvey, 1962 – ca. 1987
- Jeffrey Beeden, 1997 – 2008
- Jeremy Jepson, 2008 – 2011 (previously St George's Chapel, Windsor Castle)
- Anthony Wilson, 2011 – 2012
- Michael Kee, 2012 – 2013
- Fergus Black, 2014 – 2020
- Jeremy Jepson, 2020 – 2023
- Benedict Todd, 2024 – (formerly Organist and Assistant Director of Music, Great St Mary's, Cambridge)
