= Mayor of the Staple =

The Mayor of the Staple was the chief officer of the Company of the Staple, responsible for regulating England's staple trade and overseeing the merchants’ affairs at designated staple towns such as Calais. They were elected by the Merchants of the Staple.

As well as Calais other staples such as Westminster also had mayors. Dick Whittington served as mayor of both the Calais and Westminster staple.

== See also ==
- Staple rights

== Sources ==
- Lloyd, T. H. (1977). The English Wool Trade in the Middle Ages. Cambridge: Cambridge University Press. ISBN 978-0-52121-239-7.
- Sutton, Anne (2004). "Whittington, Richard (c.1350–1423)". Oxford Dictionary of National Biography. Oxford Dictionary of National Biography (online ed.). Oxford, England: Oxford University Press. doi:10.1093/ref:odnb/29330. (Subscription, Wikipedia Library access or UK public library membership required.)
