= Stamford School =

Public school in Lincolnshire, England

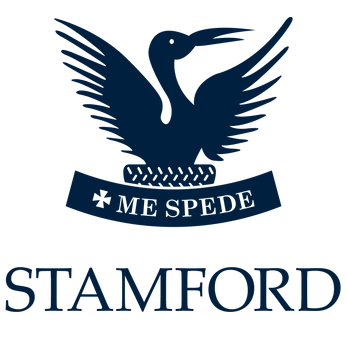
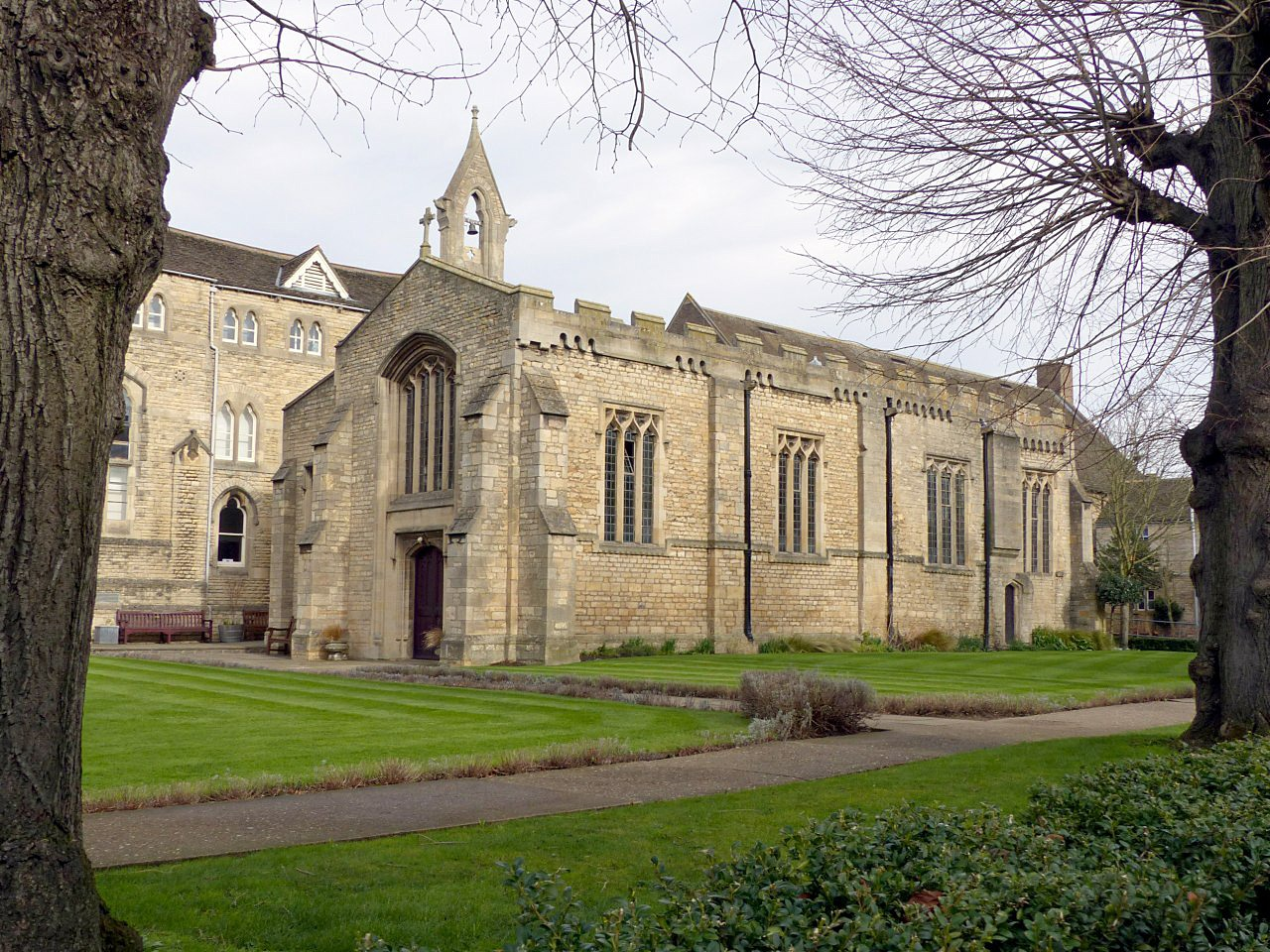
- School crest

Location
- St Paul's Street; Stamford, Lincolnshire, PE9 2BQ; England; 52.65520°N 0.47166°W

Information
- Type: Public school Private day and boarding
- Motto: Christ Me Spede
- Established: 1532; 494 years ago
- Founder: William Radcliffe
- Headmaster: Mark Steed (Until August 2025) Chris Seal (From August 2025)
- Gender: All genders
- Age: 11 to 18
- Enrolment: 1120
- Student to teacher ratio: 10:1
- Campus size: 60-acre (24 ha) and 54 buildings
- Campus type: Centre of a market town
- Houses: Radcliffe/Eliot; Exeter/Cavell; Beale/Ancaster; Anderson/Brazenose
- Colours: Navy, maroon
- Publication: The Stamfordian
- Budget: £33,268,000 (2024)
- Revenue: £31,673,000 (2024)
- Former pupils: Old Stamfordians
- Affiliations: HMC
- Website: stamfordschools.org.uk

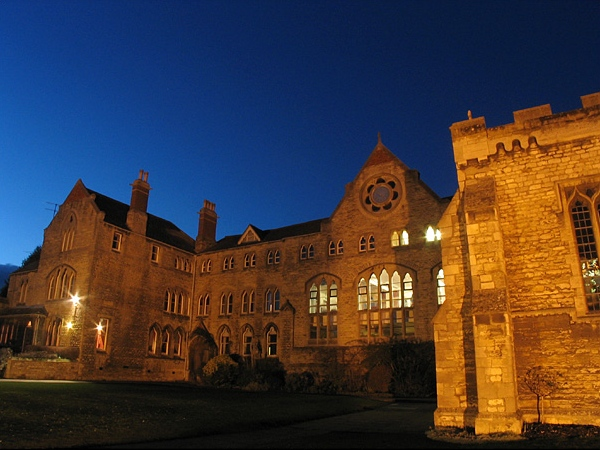
Front of Stamford School House

Stamford School is a co-educational independent school in Stamford, Lincolnshire in the English public school tradition. Founded in 1532, it has been a member of the Headmasters' and Headmistresses' Conference since 1920. With the former Stamford High School and the coeducational Stamford Junior School, it is part of the Stamford Endowed Schools (SES). From September 2023, Stamford became co-educational.

== History ==
Confirmation of Stamford School Act 1548
- Act of Parliament
- Parliament of England
- Long title: An Act for the Foundation of a School in Stamforde.
- Citation: 2 & 3 Edw. 6. c. 21 Pr.
- Territorial extent: England and Wales

Dates
- Royal assent: 14 March 1549

Status: Current legislation

The school was founded in 1532 by a local merchant and alderman, William Radcliffe, who had been encouraged when younger by Lady Margaret Beaufort, (died 1509) mother of Henry VII, though there is evidence to suggest that a school existed from the beginning of the fourteenth century. Founded as a chantry school, it fell foul of the Protestant reformers and was only saved from destruction under the Dissolution of Colleges Act 1547 (1 Edw. 6. c. 14) of Edward VI by the personal intervention of Sir William Cecil (later Lord Burghley) who worked in the service of Edward Seymour, 1st Duke of Somerset and who secured a specific act of Parliament in 1549, the Confirmation of Stamford School Act 1548 (2 & 3 Edw. 6. c. 21 Pr.), ensuring its survival. Apart from the chantries of the University of Oxford and the University of Cambridge, only those of Eton College, Winchester College, Berkhamsted, St Albans and Stamford schools survived.

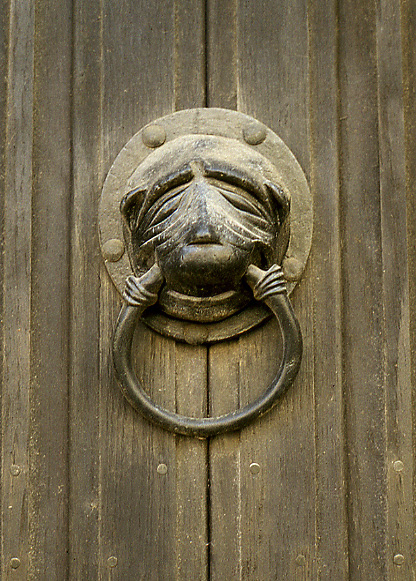
A 1961 copy of the original Brazenose knocker is mounted on a gate

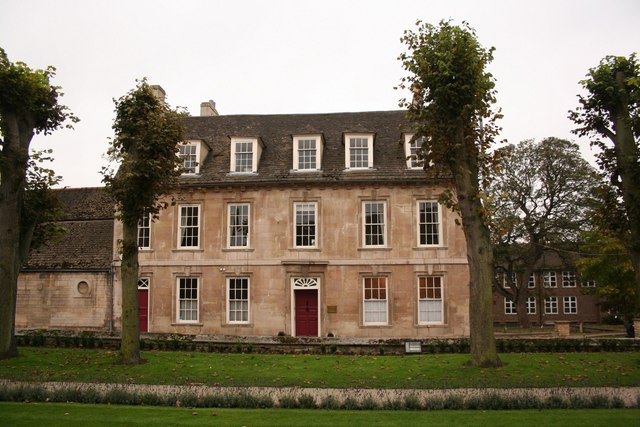
Brazenose House

Teaching is believed to have begun in the Corpus Christi chapel of Stamford's twelfth-century St Mary's Church, but by 1566 was taking place in the remaining portion of the redundant St Paul's Church, originally built no later than 1152. This building continued in use as a school room until the early twentieth century when it was restored and extended and, in 1930, returned to use as a chapel. In 1961, a nineteenth-century Gray and Davison pipe organ was installed although this was removed in the 1990s and replaced with an electronic substitute. Over its history the school has built or absorbed seventeenth-, eighteenth- and nineteenth-century buildings, besides the site of a further demolished medieval church (Holy Trinity/St Stephen's) and remains of Brazenose College built by the secessionists from the University of Oxford in the fourteenth century. Brasenose College, Oxford bought Brazenose House in 1890 to recover the original medieval brass Brazenose knocker.

The right of appointment of the school's master, a position hotly contested in past centuries on account of the post's disproportionately large salary, was shared between the Mayor of Stamford and the Master of St John's College, Cambridge. Both Stamford Town Council and St John's College still have nominees on the school's governing body. Stamford School had a sister school, Stamford High School which was founded in 1877. It closed in 2023 as part of the co-educational merger with Stamford School. The funds for the foundation of the High School and the further financial endowment of the existing boys' school were appropriated from the endowment of Browne's Hospital by Act of Parliament in 1871. This trust had been established for the relief of poverty by William Browne (died 1489), another wealthy wool merchant and alderman of the town, and his gift is commemorated in the name of a school house.

From 1975, Lincolnshire County Council purchased places at Stamford School and Stamford High School on the basis that Stamford had no LEA grammar school (unlike the county's other towns). This local form of the Assisted Places Scheme provided funding to send children to the two schools that were formerly direct-grant grammars. The national Assisted Places Scheme was ended by the Labour government in 1997 but the Stamford arrangements remained in place as an increasingly protracted transitional arrangement. In 2006, Lincolnshire County Council agreed to taper down from 50 the number of county scholarships to the Stamford Endowed Schools so that there would be no new scholarships from 2012.

In recent years, the two schools were united under the leadership of a single principal as the Stamford Endowed Schools. This organisation comprised Stamford Junior School, a co-educational establishment for pupils aged between 2 and 11 years and Stamford School and Stamford High School for students aged 11–18. Sixth form teaching was carried out jointly between Stamford School and Stamford High School. This was referred to as the diamond school model.

In 2012 the Memorial Sports Centre was opened by Lord Sebastian Coe. The facility contains a 25m swimming pool, replacing the outdoor Memorial Swimming Pool which opened in 1956. This was followed by the opening of the multi-million pound Wothorpe Sports Centre in 2022, built opposite Stamford Junior School on Wothorpe Road.

Stamford Endowed Schools became co-educational from September 2023 and fully co-educational in every year group from 2024. The High School site is now used as the Sixth Form campus, named 'St Martin's'.

Since 1885 The Stamfordian has been the school magazine of Stamford School. Currently published annually in the Autumn term, it provides for current pupils and parents as well as Old Stamfordians and prospective parents an account of a year in the life of the school.

== School crest ==
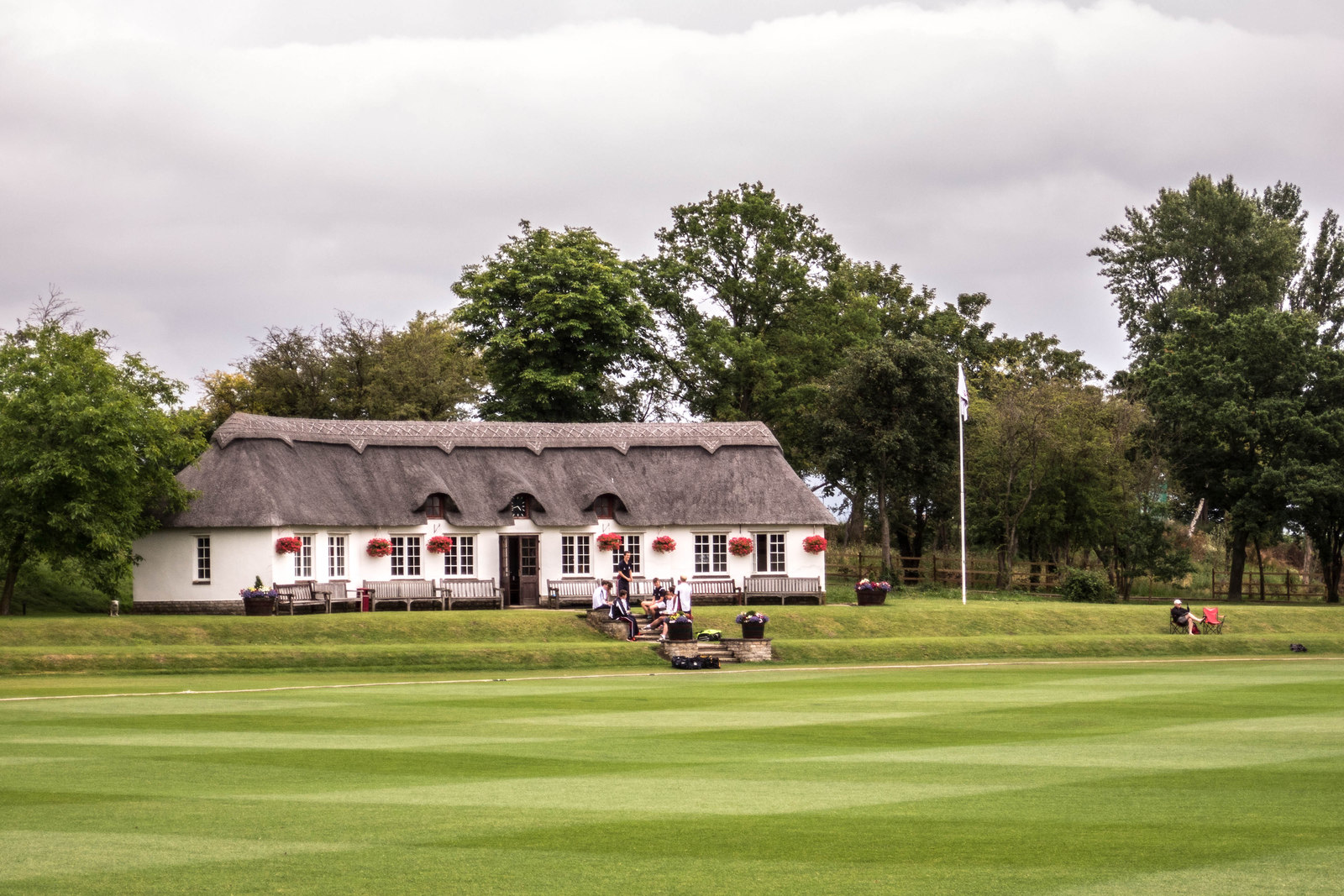
The thatched cricket pavilion

The school's crest is a stork (the spede bird) with wings displayed on a wool bale over the motto + me spede, that is Christ me spede. The emblem was adopted from medieval wool merchant, William Browne, after the school had been re-endowed from Browne's Charity in 1873. (The stork is supposed to be a rebus on his wife, Margaret's maiden name of Stoke). The current form was designed by Nelson Dawson.

== Notable alumni (Old Stamfordians) ==
=== Politics and public service ===
- Nick Anstee, Lord Mayor of London
- Simon Burns, Conservative MP for West Chelmsford, Minister of State
- John Cecil, 5th Earl of Exeter, MP for Stamford, Grand Tourist and connoisseur
- William Cecil, 1st Baron Burghley, Lord High Treasurer of England and chief advisor to Queen Elizabeth I
- Alfred Harmsworth, 1st Viscount Northcliffe, newspaper magnate, founder of the Daily Mail and Daily Mirror, owner of The Times
- J. F. Horrabin, Labour MP for Peterborough, journalist and broadcaster
- Sir Thomas Wilson, author, translator, diplomat, Member of Parliament, Keeper of the King's Records
- Robert Wardle Director of the Serious Fraud Office

=== Law ===
- Sir Richard Cayley, Chief Justice of Ceylon
- Sir Ronald Long, President of the Law Society
- Nicholas Fluck, President of the Law Society

=== Music ===
- Sir Malcolm Sargent, conductor
- Sir Michael Tippett, composer
- Julian Wastall, composer

=== Literature and the arts ===
- Michael Asher, author and explorer
- Oliver Bayldon, production designer and writer
- Torben Betts, playwright
- Tom Butcher, film, television and stage actor
- Nelson Dawson, silversmith, jeweller, designer, etcher and painter of the Arts and Crafts movement.
- Colin Dexter, author of the Inspector Morse detective novels; Morse is described as an Old Stamfordian
- Neil McCarthy, film and television actor
- Francis Peck, antiquary
- John Radford, wine writer and broadcaster
- George Robinson, television actor
- Ralph Robinson, Renaissance scholar, first translator into English of Thomas More's Utopia
- Thomas Seaton, founder of Seatonian Prize for Poetry at the University of Cambridge
- John Terraine, military historian
- Ben Willbond, film and television actor
- Peter Baynton, Oscar-winning director of The Boy, the Mole, the Fox and the Horse

=== Military ===
- Apparanda Aiyappa, Indian Army
- Simon Bryant, Commander-in-Chief, RAF Air Command
- John Drewienkiewicz
- Mike Jackson, Chief of the General Staff.

=== Academia and the church ===
- Martin Aitken, professor of archaeometry, University of Oxford, Fellow of Linacre College, Oxford
- Zachary Brooke, Lady Margaret's Professor of Divinity, University of Cambridge
- Henry Edwards, Dean of Bangor
- Charles John Ellicott, professor of divinity at King's College London and the University of Cambridge and Bishop of Gloucester and Bristol
- Philip Goodrich, Bishop of Worcester
- Malcolm Jeeves, psychologist
- Steven V. Ley, Professor of Chemistry at the University of Cambridge, Fellow of Trinity College, Cambridge
- Cecil Richard Norgate, bishop of Masasi, Tanzania
- Ian Roberts, professor of linguistics University of Cambridge, Fellow of Downing College
- M. Stanley Whittingham, lithium-ion battery pioneer and 2019 Nobel Prize in Chemistry laureate

=== Commerce and industry ===
- Oliver Hemsley, CEO, Numis Securities

=== Sport ===
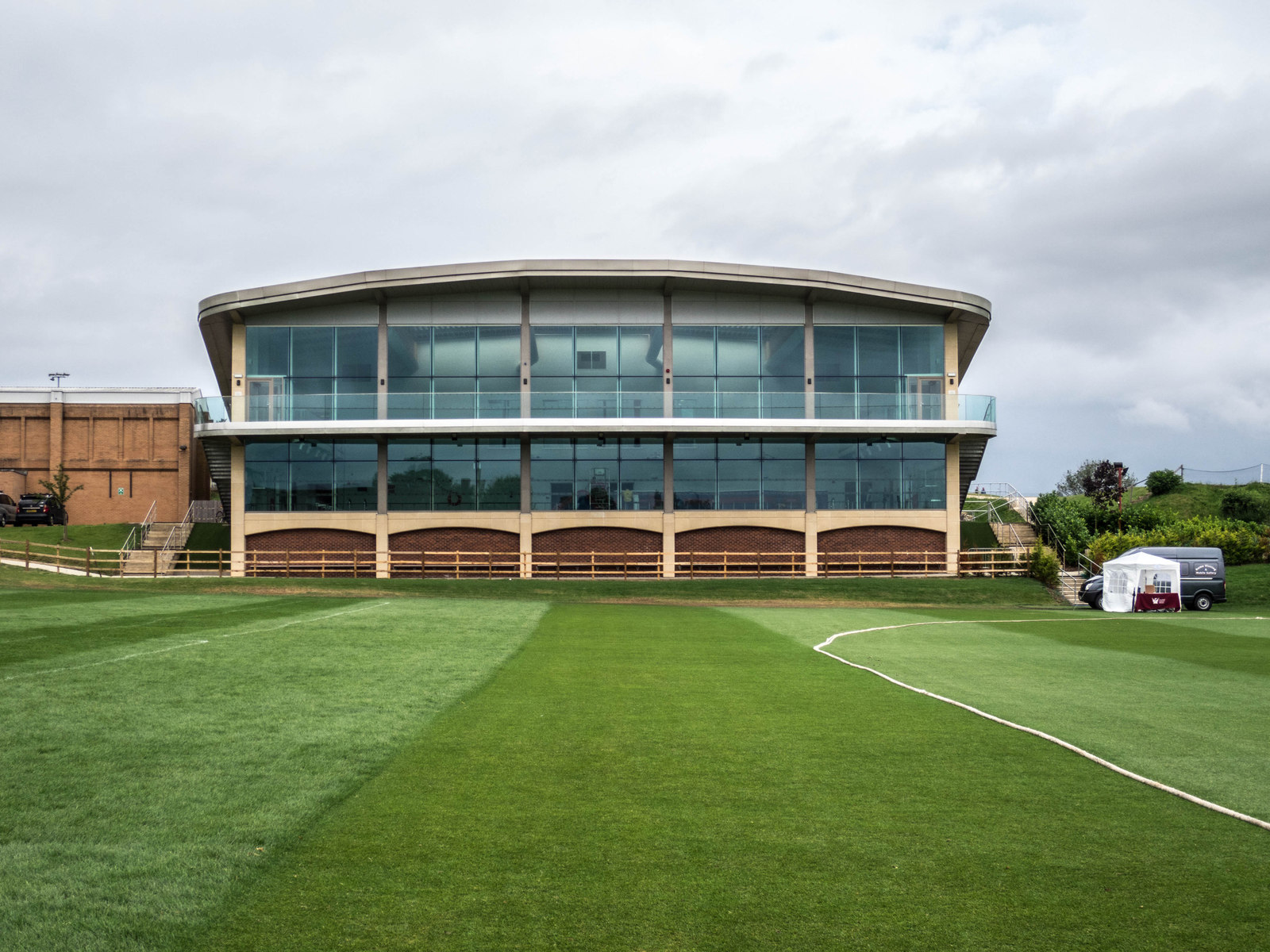
Sports complex

- Robert Clift, gold medal-winning hockey player at the 1988 Seoul Olympics
- Joey Evison, Nottinghamshire county cricket
- Simon Hodgkinson, England international rugby
- Josh Hull, cricketer
- Mark James, golfer, captain European Ryder Cup team
- Shan Masood, Pakistani Test cricketer
- Alexander Sims, racing driver in Formula E
- M. J. K. Smith, England international rugby, England international cricket captain
- Iwan Thomas, Olympic athlete

== Notable schoolmasters ==
- Robert Browne, clergyman and founder of the Brownists
- Walter Douglas
- William Dugard, headmaster of Merchant Taylors' School, Northwood, Royalist propagandist, printer of Basilikon Doron
- Anthony Ewbank
- Dean Headley, Rugby and Cricket professional
- Gerard Hoffnung, musician, humourist, cartoonist
- Harold Andrew Mason
- F. L. Woodward
- Gizz Butt, touring guitarist for The Prodigy, taught music at Stamford

== See also ==
- List of the oldest schools in the United Kingdom
- History of Brasenose College, Oxford
- St Paul's Church, Stamford – The school chapel
