= United Reformed Church, Stamford =

Church in Stamford, Lincolnshire, England

Coordinates: 52°39.2119′N 0°28.560′W

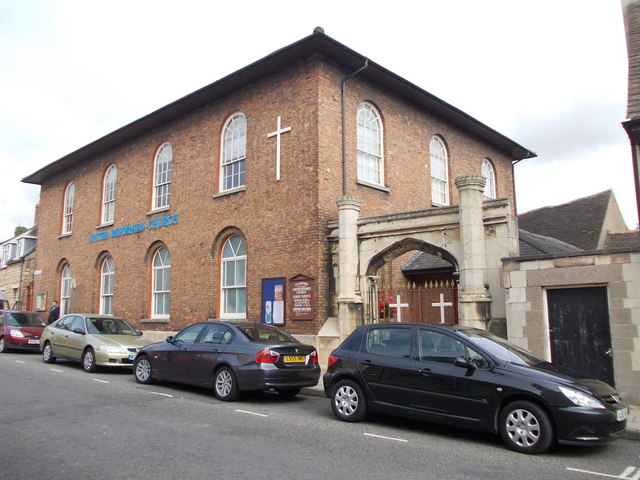
The church in 2012

The United Reformed (formerly Congregational) Church is a congregation in Stamford, Lincolnshire, based in a late-Georgian building situated on Star Lane.

== History of the site ==
The current church stands on land purchased in 1719 following the destruction in 1714 of an earlier, late seventeenth-century chapel in nearby St Paul’s Street by a Jacobite mob. The new chapel, constructed in 1720, held 300 worshippers but was itself demolished in 1819 to make way for the present place of worship. Until 1923, when a small seventeenth-century building on the west side of Star Lane was demolished, entry to the lane was extremely narrow and the view of the church from the south thus far less obvious than it appears today.

== The present building ==
The present church was erected over a few months in 1819 “on a large scale to reflect its increasing respectability” seating 800; it cost £1,800. It was constructed in red brick (a rarity in stone-built Stamford) on an ashlar plinth, four bays long by three wide, with a slate roof. All the windows are arched, the upper ones containing their original Georgian glazing bars, while the lower range contain more recent Victorian fenestration. The church has a classical interior with a gallery around three sides supported by Doric columns, a corniced stucco ceiling and nineteenth century box pews.

The entrance, off a small yard to the ‘right’ of the building is via “a Tudorish gateway” erected in 1862, made from a section of the old Cornmarket arcade that stood in Broad Street in front of Browne's Hospital.

== The Church today ==
The building’s name was changed following the merger of the Presbyterian Church of England and the Congregational Church in England and Wales in 1972.

The building is a Grade II Listed Building.

The Stamford congregation is part of the East Midlands Synod of the United Reformed Church in England. Services are led by the Minister, The Revd Jane Campbell. A variety of special services are organised, including services on Sunday at 10.45am and 6.30pm.

Stamford URC is part of the Stamford Street Pastors initiative and of the Stamford Churches Together group. The congregation manages the nearby Congregation Hall in Broad Street.
