= Stamford, Lincolnshire =

Town in Lincolnshire, England

Coordinates: 52°39′14″N 0°28′58″W

Stamford
- Town and Civil Parish
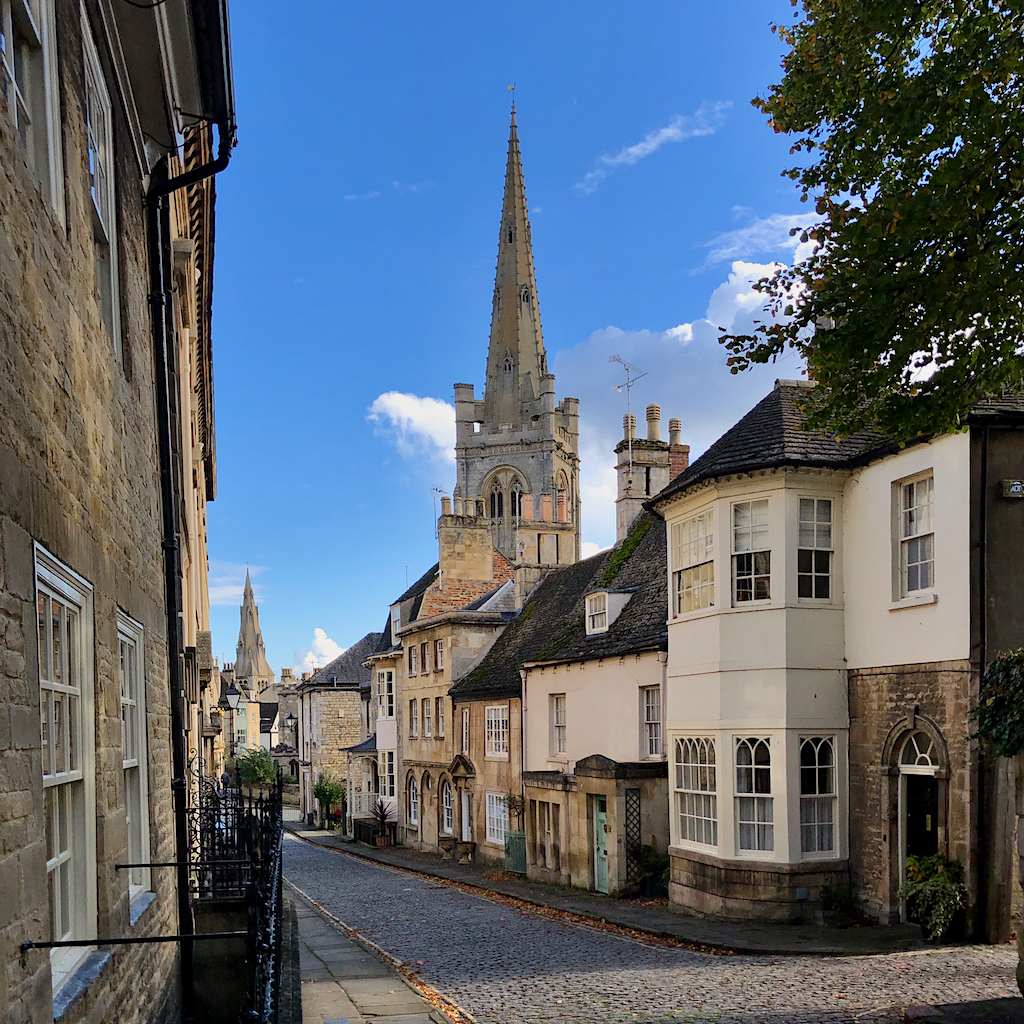
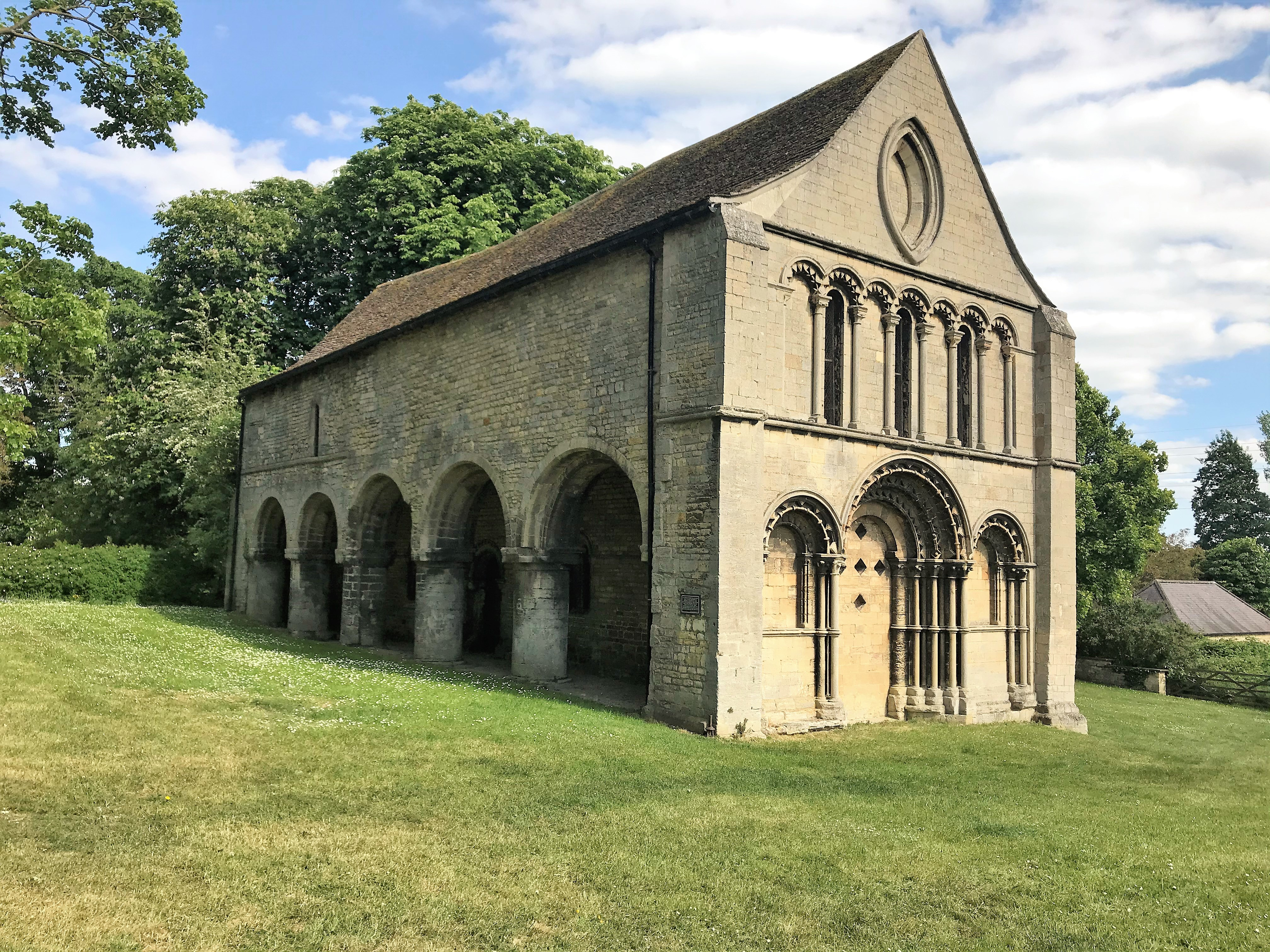
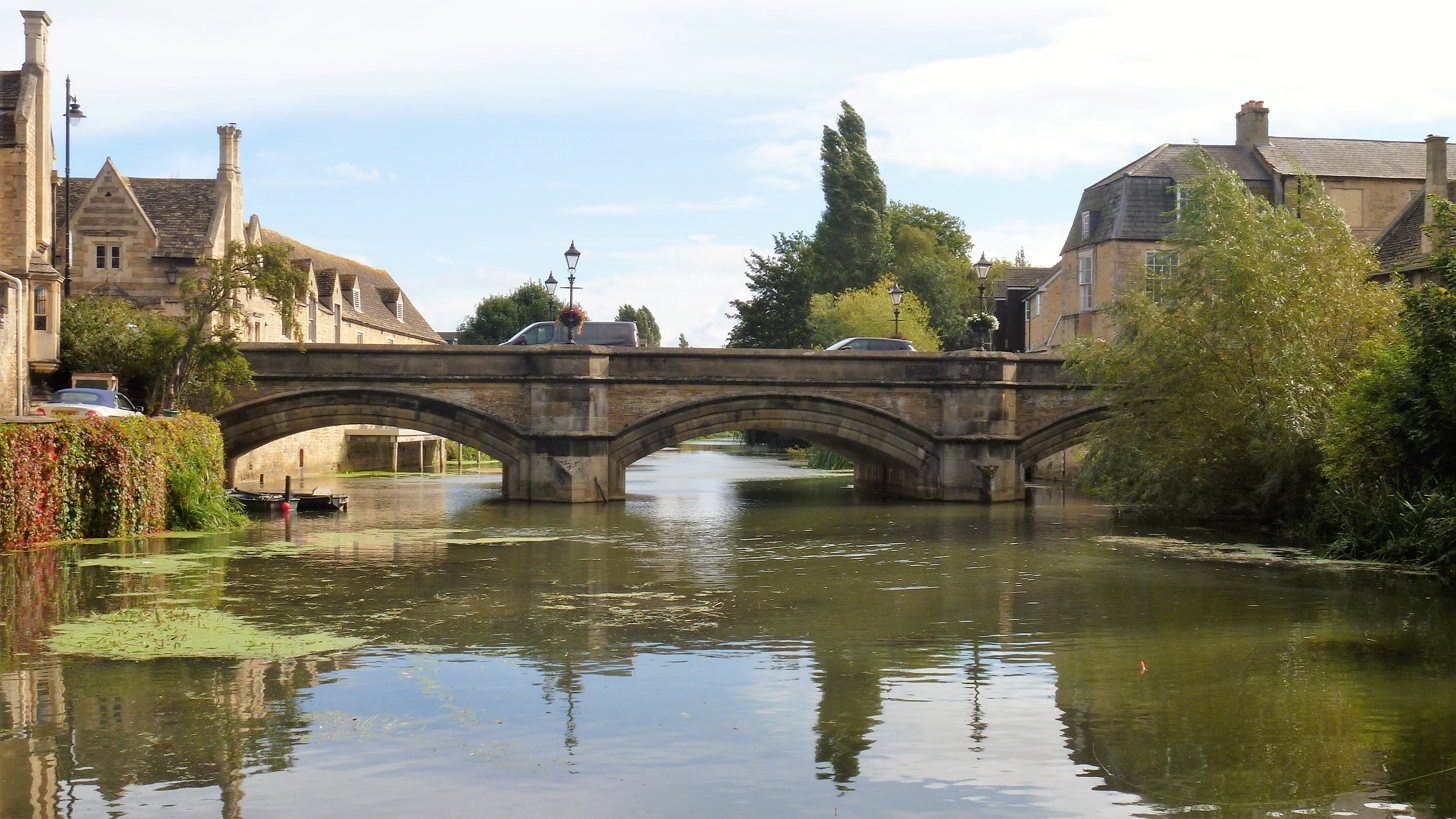
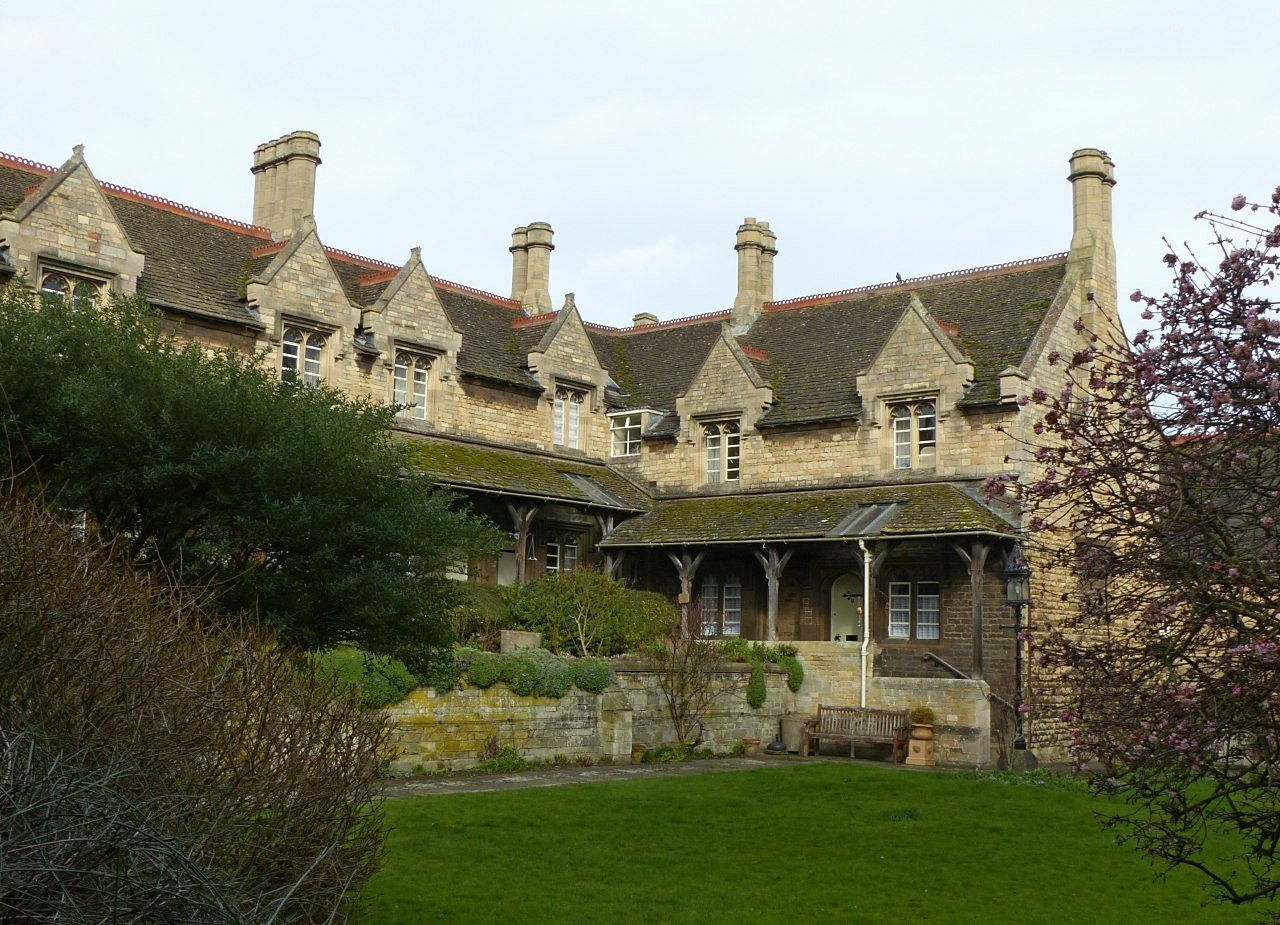
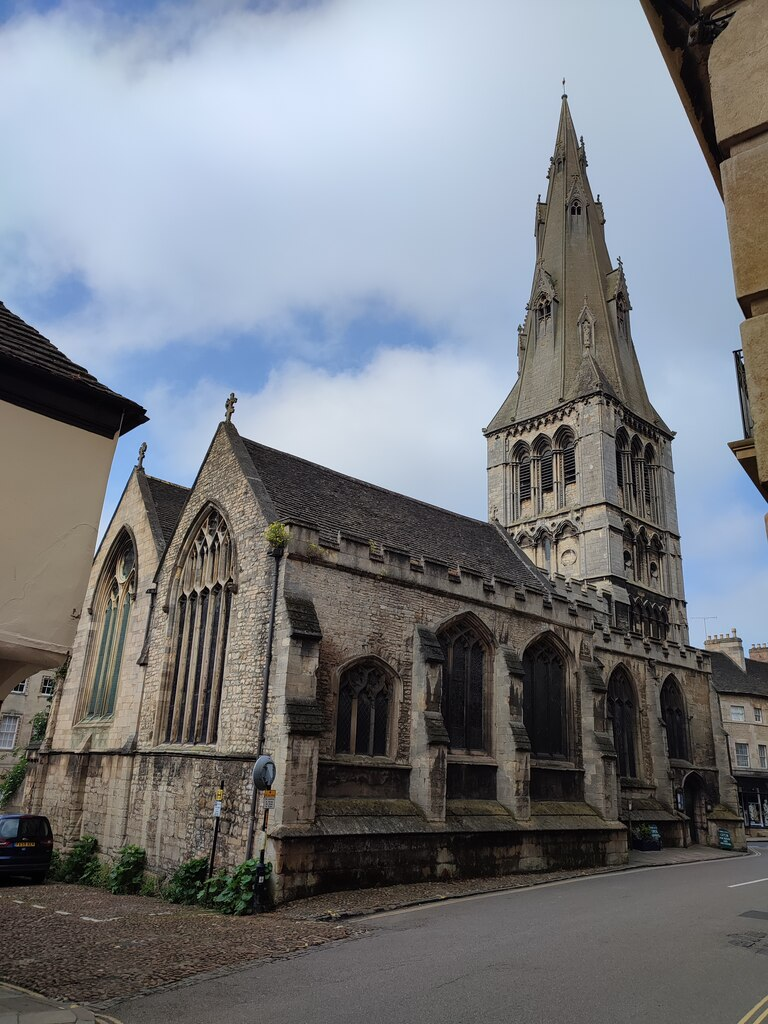
- Barn Hill St Leonard's Priory River Welland Browne's Hospital St Mary’s Church

- Coat of arms

- Location within Lincolnshire
- Population: 20,742 (2021 Census)
- OS grid reference: TF0207
  - London: 92 mi (148 km) S
- Civil parish: Stamford
- District: South Kesteven
- Shire county: Lincolnshire
- Region: East Midlands
- Country: England
- Sovereign state: United Kingdom
- Areas of the town: List: Belmesthorpe (Village); Burghley; Great Casterton (Village) (part); Little Casterton (Village); Ryhall (Village); Stamford Baron; St Martin's Without (Part); Tinwell (Village); Uffington (Village)
- Post town: STAMFORD
- Postcode district: PE9
- Dialling code: 01780
- Police: Lincolnshire
- Fire: Lincolnshire
- Ambulance: East Midlands
- UK Parliament: Rutland and Stamford
- Website: Stamford Town Council

Stamford is a market town and civil parish in the South Kesteven district of Lincolnshire, England. The population at the 2011 census was 19,701 and estimated at 20,645 in 2019. The town has 17th- and 18th-century stone buildings, older timber-framed buildings and five medieval parish churches.

Stamford is a frequent film location. In 2013 it was rated a top place to live in a survey by The Sunday Times. Its name was passed on to Stamford, Connecticut, founded in 1641.

== Toponymy ==
The place-name Stamford is first attested in the Anglo-Saxon Chronicle, where it appears as Steanford in 922 and Stanford in 942. It appears as Stanford in Domesday Book of 1086. The name means stony ford.

== History ==
=== Roman and Medieval Stamford ===
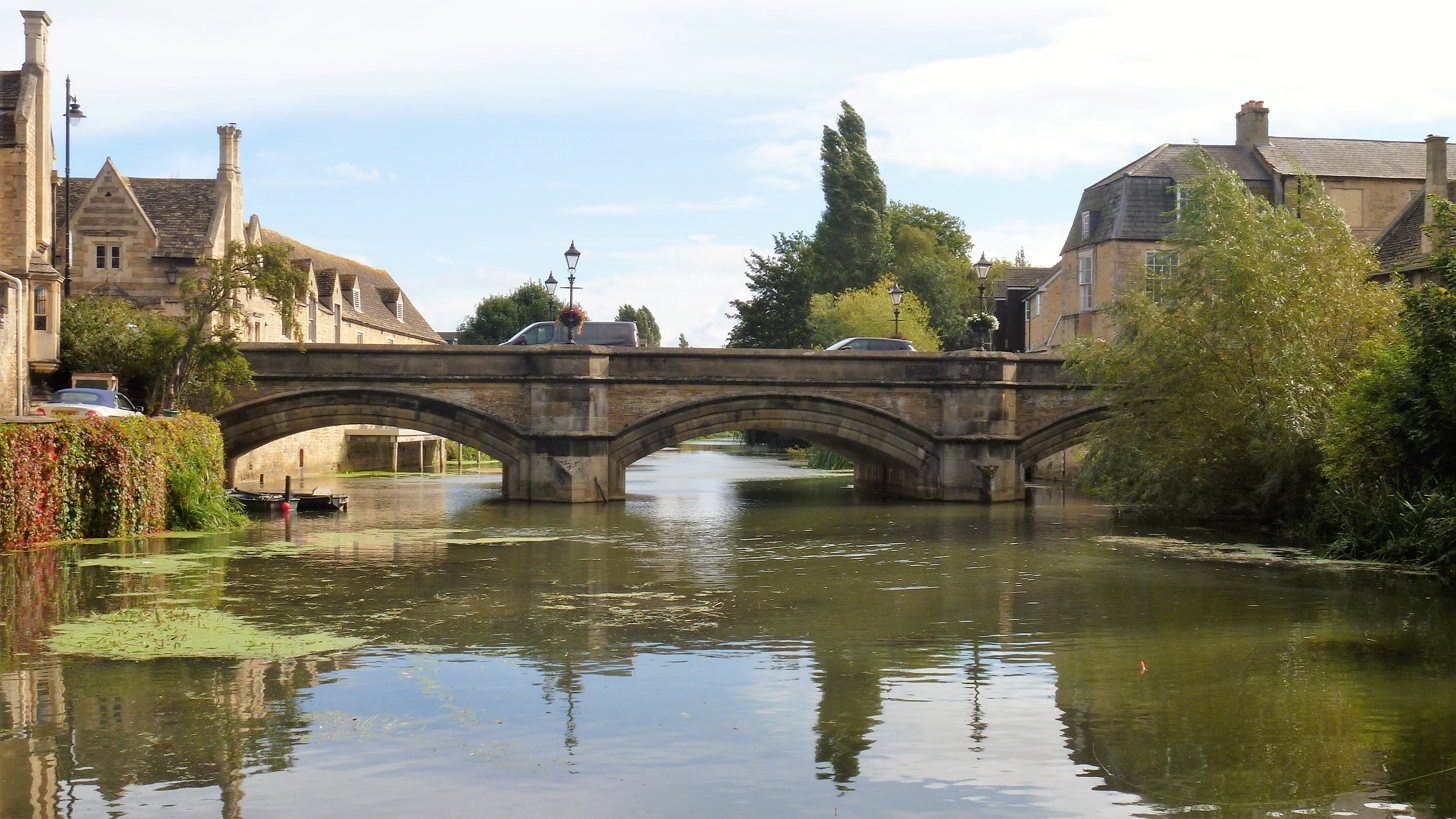
Stamford

The Romans built Ermine Street across what is now Burghley Park and forded the River Welland to the west of Stamford, eventually reaching Lincoln. They also built a town to the north at Great Casterton on the River Gwash. In 61 CE Boudica followed the Roman legion Legio IX Hispana across the river. The Anglo-Saxons later chose Stamford as the main town, being on a larger river than the Gwash.

In 972 King Edgar made Stamford a borough. The Anglo-Saxons and Danes faced each other across the river. The town had grown as a Danish settlement at the lowest point that the Welland could be crossed by ford or bridge. Stamford was the only one of the Five Boroughs of the Danelaw not to become a county town. Initially a pottery centre making Stamford Ware, it had gained fame by the Middle Ages for its production of the woollen cloth known as Stamford cloth or haberget, which "In Henry III's reign... was well known in Venice."

Stamford was a walled town, but only a small portion of the wall remains. Stamford became an inland port on the Great North Road, the latter superseding Ermine Street in importance. Notable buildings in the town include the medieval Browne's Hospital, several churches and the buildings of Stamford School, a public school founded in 1532.

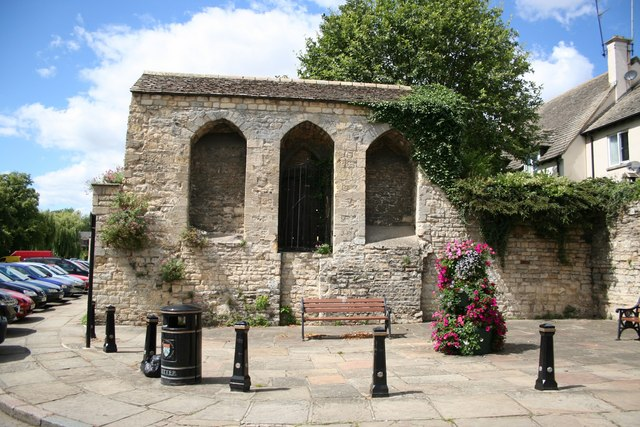
A fragment of Stamford Castle

A Norman castle was built about 1075 and apparently demolished in 1484. The site stood derelict until the late 20th century, when it was built over and now includes a bus station and a modern housing development. A small part of the curtain wall survives at the junction of Castle Dyke and Bath Row.

In 1333, a group of students and tutors from the University of Oxford, including some from Merton College and Brasenose Hall, dissatisfied with conditions at the university, left Oxford to found a rival institution at Stamford. Oxford had seen violence between students and masters hailing from Northern and Southern England, and those who left for Stamford were Northerners. Oxford and Cambridge universities petitioned Edward III, and the King ordered the closure of the college and the return of the students to Oxford; this took several attempts, but seems to have finally been achieved in 1335. MA students at Oxford until 1827 were obliged to take an oath: "You shall also swear that you will not read lectures, or hear them read, at Stamford, as in a University study, or college general." The site and limited remains of the former Brazenose College, Stamford, where Oxford secessionists lived and studied, now form part of Stamford School.

Stamford has been hosting an annual fair since the Middle Ages. It is mentioned in Shakespeare's Henry IV, Part 2 (Act 3, Scene 2). Held in mid-Lent, it is now the largest street fair in Lincolnshire and among the largest in the country. On 7 March 1190, men at the fair who were preparing to go on the crusade led a pogrom, in which several of the Stamford Jews were killed, and the rest, who escaped with difficulty, were given refuge in the castle. Their houses, however, were plundered, and a great quantity of money was seized.

==== Religious houses and hospitals ====
Stamford's importance and wealth in the Middle Ages meant that a number of religious houses and hospitals were established in or near the town. The monasteries and friaries had all been closed at the Dissolution by 1539. Street names are indicative of their presence: Priory Road, Austin Street, Blackfriars Street etc.

Monasteries

- Benedictine Priory of St Leonard – certainly established by 1082 with the possibility of it having been founded originally in the 7th century. Part of the church still stands on Priory Road.
- Priory of Austin Canons at Newstead, just east of Stamford. Originally founded as a hospital at the end of the 12th century it became a priory of Austin Canons in the 1240s.
- Priory of St Michael – this was a nunnery established by an abbot of Peterborough in or before 1155 in Stamford Baron. It was a large establishment for about 40 nuns. In 1354 it was amalgamated with the Augustinian nunnery of Wothorpe which had been depopulated by plague. The reredorter is a Scheduled Monument.

Friaries At least five orders of friars were established within the town of Stamford from the 13th century onwards.

- The Austin Friars established in the 1340s in a house near St Peter's Gate on land formerly occupied by the Friars of the Sack. After the Dissolution of the Monasteries in 1539 the land was eventually bought by the Cecil family of Burghley.
- The Dominican Friars probably arrived in the 1230s and were regularly supported with donations by the monarchy. The house was dissolved by 1539.
- The Franciscan Friars had a house - Greyfriars, Stamford - in the east suburb near St Paul's gate.
- The Carmelite Friars were founded about 1268 in the east part of the town. The friary is said to have been a magnificent structure, famous for its beautiful church.
- The Friars of the Sack or Brothers of Penitence – the sack referred to their clothes, made of sackcloth.

Hospitals

- Hospital of St John Baptist and St Thomas the Martyr on Stamford Bridge. This hospital was certainly in existence from 1323 until the eve of the Reformation.
- The Hospital of St Giles was built just outside Stamford as it was intended for lepers and was certainly operating in the 14th century.
- Hospital of All Saints was founded in 1485 by William Browne, a wool merchant, for the support of two chaplains and for the distribution of alms to twelve poor persons, who should pray for the soul of the founder. Browne's Hospital is still used for this purpose.

=== Tudor and Stuart Stamford ===
By the early 1500s the wool and broadcloth industry in England, on which Stamford depended, had declined significantly. Stamford was sufficiently poor, financially and demographically, that in 1548 it had to amalgamate its eleven parishes into six and its population had reduced to 800.

However, by the second half of the 17th century, after almost 150 years of stagnation, the population started to increase. As Stamford emerged into the 17th century, leather and fibre working (in the widest sense; weavers, ropers and tailors) were the main activities along with wood and stone working.

In the 1660s the various efforts to make the River Welland navigable again were finally successful. Stamford then became a centre for the malting trade as the barley from nearby fenlands to the east and heathlands to the north and west could make its way more easily and cheaper to the town.

The Great North Road passed through Stamford. It had always been a halting town for travellers; Henry VIII, Queen Elizabeth, James I and Charles I all passed through and it had been a post station for the postal service journey in Elizabeth's reign. By the later 17th century roads start to be used more for longer distance travelling. In 1663 an Act of Parliament was passed to set up turnpikes on the Great North Road, and this was to make a notable difference to Stamford's fortunes in the following century.

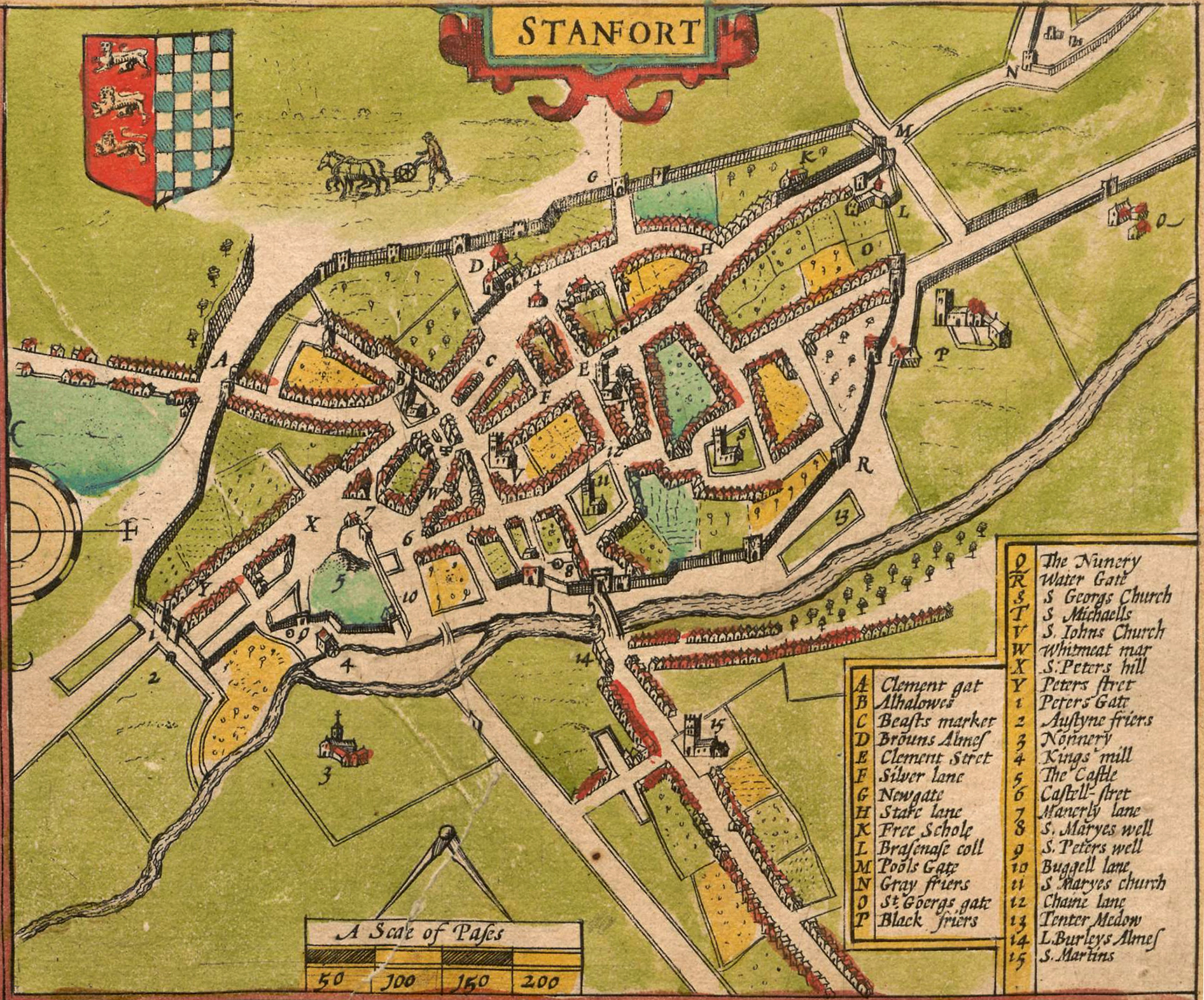
Map by John Speed, 1611-12

During the English Civil War local loyalties were split. Thomas Hatcher MP was a Parliamentarian. Royalists used Wothorpe and Burghley as defensive positions. In the summer of 1643 the Royalists were besieged at Burghley on 24 July after a defeat at Peterborough on 19 July. The army of Viscount Campden was heavily outnumbered and surrendered the following day.

=== Bull Run ===
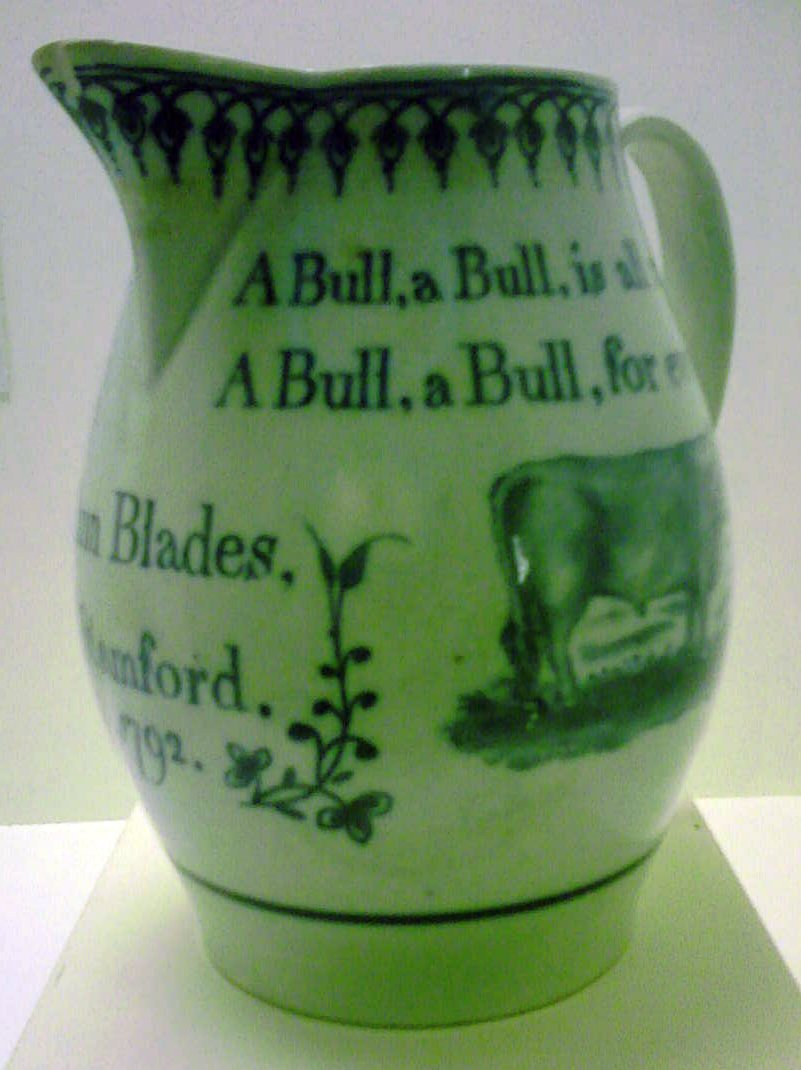
A jug commemorates Ann Blades – a Stamford bull runner in 1792

For over 600 years Stamford was the site of the Stamford bull run, held annually on 13 November, St Brice's day, until 1839. Local tradition says it began after William de Warenne, 5th Earl of Surrey had seen two bulls fighting in the meadow beneath his castle. Some butchers came to part the combatants and one bull ran into the town. The earl mounted his horse and rode after the animal; he enjoyed the sport so much that he gave the meadow where the fight began to the butchers of Stamford, on condition that they continue to provide a bull to be run in the town every 13 November.

=== Victorian period to 21st century ===
The East Coast Main Line would have gone through Stamford, as an important postal town at the time, but resistance led to routing it instead through Peterborough, whose importance and size increased at Stamford's expense.

During the Second World War, the area round Stamford contained several military sites, including RAF station, airborne encampments and a prisoner-of-war camp. Within the town, Rock House held the headquarters of Stanisław Sosabowski and the staff of the Polish 1st Independent Parachute Brigade. A memorial plaque was unveiled there in 2004. A 2,000lb bomb was dropped on St Leonard St on 31 October 1940, which never exploded. 1,000 people were evacuated, until 3 November 1940.

Stamford Museum occupied a Victorian building in Broad Street from 1980 until June 2011, when it succumbed to Lincolnshire County Council budget cuts. Some exhibits have been moved to a "Discover Stamford" space at the town library and to Stamford Town Hall.

== Governance ==
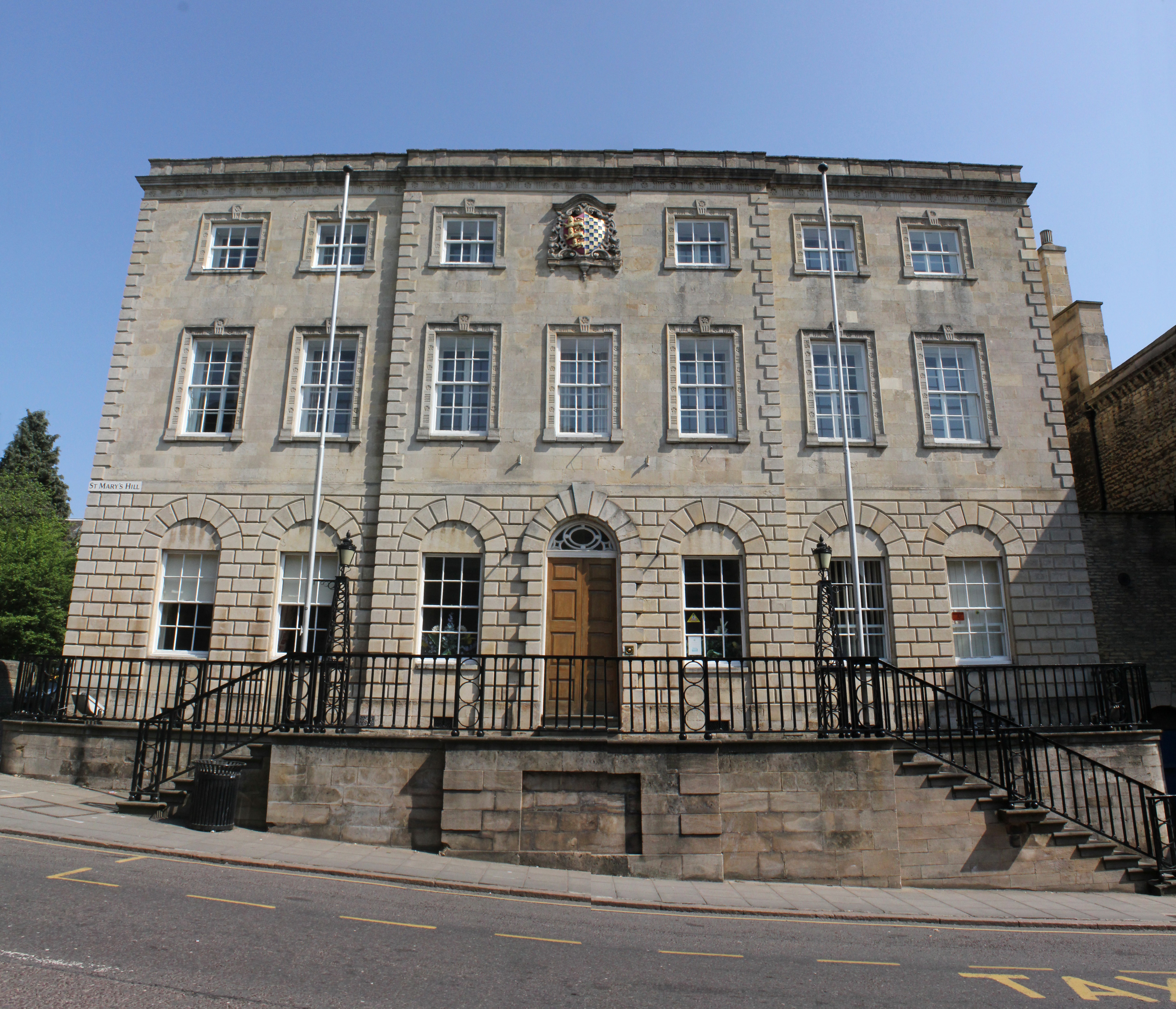
Stamford Town Hall

There are three tiers of local government covering Stamford, at parish (town), district and county level: Stamford Town Council, South Kesteven District Council, and Lincolnshire County Council. The town council is based at Stamford Town Hall on St Mary's Hill, which was built in 1779.

=== Administrative history ===
Stamford was an ancient borough. The original borough was entirely on the north bank of the River Welland, which was historically the boundary between Lincolnshire and Northamptonshire. South of the river was Stamford Baron in Northamptonshire. The Stamford constituency was enlarged in 1832 to also include the built-up part of Stamford Baron. In 1836 Stamford was reformed to become a municipal borough, at which point the municipal boundaries were adjusted to match the recently enlarged constituency.

After 1836 the borough therefore straddled Lincolnshire and Northamptonshire. When elected county councils were established in 1889 boroughs were no longer allowed to straddle county boundaries, and so the parts of the borough south of the river were transferred to Lincolnshire, with Kesteven County Council serving as the upper tier authority. Local government was reformed again in 1974, when Kesteven County Council was replaced by Lincolnshire County Council, and the borough of Stamford was abolished, with district-level functions passing to the new South Kesteven District Council. Stamford Town Council was established as a successor parish council in 1974, covering the area of the former borough.

Stamford's town council has arms: Per pale dexter side Gules three Lions passant guardant in pale Or and the sinister side chequy Or and Azure. The three lions are the English royal arms, granted to the town by Edward IV for its part in the "Lincolnshire Uprising". The blue and gold chequers are the arms of the De Warenne family, which held the manor here in the 13th century.

=== Parliamentary representation ===
Stamford belongs to the parliamentary constituency of Rutland and Stamford. The current MP is Alicia Kearns (Conservative).

Prior to the 2024 election, Stamford formed part of the Grantham and Stamford constituency. Previous MPs include Gareth Davies, who won the seat at the 2019 General Election and Nick Boles.

== Geography ==
Stamford, on the bank of the River Welland, forms a south-westerly protrusion of Lincolnshire between Rutland to the north and west, Peterborough to the south, and Northamptonshire to the south-west. There have been mistaken claims of a quadripoint where four ceremonial counties – Rutland, Lincolnshire, Cambridgeshire and Northamptonshire – would meet at a point but the location actually has two tripoints some 20 metres (22 yd) apart.

The River Welland forms the border between two historic counties: Lincolnshire to the north and Soke of Peterborough in Northamptonshire to the south.

In 1991, the boundary between Lincolnshire and Rutland (then part of Leicestershire) in the Stamford area was redrawn. It now mostly follows the A1 to the railway line. The conjoined parish of Wothorpe is in the city of Peterborough. Barnack Road is the Lincolnshire/Peterborough boundary where it borders St Martin's Without.

The river downstream of the town bridge and some of the meadows fall within the drainage area of the Welland and Deepings Internal Drainage Board.

=== Geology ===
Much of Stamford is built on Middle Jurassic Lincolnshire limestone, with mudstones and sandstones.

The area is known for limestone and slate quarries. Cream-coloured Collyweston stone slate is found on the roofs of many Stamford stone buildings. Stamford Stone in Barnack has quarries at Marholm and Holywell. Clipsham Stone has two quarries in Clipsham.

=== Palaeontology ===
In 1968, a specimen of the sauropod dinosaur Cetiosaurus oxoniensis was found in the Williamson Cliffe Quarry, close to Great Casterton in adjacent Rutland. Some 15 metres (49 ft) long, it is about 170 million years old, from the Aalenian or Bajocian era of the Jurassic period. It is one of the most complete dinosaur skeletons found in the UK and was installed in 1975 in the Leicester Museum & Art Gallery.

=== Climate ===
Stamford has an oceanic climate (Köppen: Cfb) featuring pleasantly warm summers, cool winters, and very little seasonal variation in rainfall.

The warmest month is July, with an average high of 22°C, and the coldest month is January, with an average high of 7°C. The typically wettest month is October, while the driest is February, though year-to-year variation in the wettest and driest months can be significant.

Rainfall is moderate to low throughout the year at 613mm annually, and it is much drier than the UK average. Summers are usually showery, but there can be long stretches of dry weather at any time of year, most often in spring and summer.

Snow is uncommon and has become rarer due to climate change.

The nearest official weather station to Stamford is Wittering, which is 3 miles to the southwest. The 1991-2020 climate period data is shown below.

Climate data for Stamford, Lincolnshire, UK (1991-2020 averages)
Month	Jan	Feb	Mar	Apr	May	Jun	Jul	Aug	Sep	Oct	Nov	Dec	Year
Mean daily maximum °C (°F)	7.14 (44.85)	7.86 (46.15)	10.38 (50.68)	13.39 (56.10)	16.51 (61.72)	19.46 (67.03)	22.07 (71.73)	21.74 (71.13)	18.73 (65.71)	14.36 (57.85)	10.08 (50.14)	7.37 (45.27)	14.09 (57.36)
Mean daily minimum °C (°F)	1.45 (34.61)	1.42 (34.56)	2.72 (36.90)	4.57 (40.23)	7.35 (45.23)	10.25 (50.45)	12.33 (54.19)	12.30 (54.14)	10.21 (50.38)	7.43 (45.37)	4.04 (39.27)	1.8 (35.2)	6.32 (43.38)
Average rainfall mm (inches)	46.96 (1.85)	38.92 (1.53)	38.99 (1.54)	44.15 (1.74)	49.55 (1.95)	52.91 (2.08)	55.51 (2.19)	59.86 (2.36)	52.85 (2.08)	63.34 (2.49)	57.50 (2.26)	53.01 (2.09)	613.55 (24.16)
Source: UK Met Office

== Economy ==
Tourism is important to Stamford's economy, as are professional law and accountancy firms. Health, education and other public-service employers also feature, notably a hospital (Stamford and Rutland Hospital), a medical general practice, schools (some independent) and a further education college. Hospitality is provided by several hotels, licensed premises, restaurants, tea rooms and cafés.

The licensed premises reflect the history of the town. The George Hotel, Lord Burghley, William Cecil, Danish Invader and Jolly Brewer are among nearly 30 premises serving real ale. Surrounding villages and Rutland Water provide other venues and employment opportunities, as do several annual events at Burghley House.

=== Retail ===
The town centre's major retail and service sector has many independent boutique stores and draws shoppers from a wide area. Several streets are traffic-free. Outlets include gift shops, eateries, men's and women's outfitters, shoe shops, florists, hairdressers, beauty therapists and acupuncture and health-care services. Harrison & Dunn, Dawson of Stamford, the George Hotel and The Crown Arts Centre are other popular places. Stamford has several hotels, coffee shops and restaurants. Its branch of the national jeweller F. Hinds can trace its history back to the clockmaker Joseph Hinds, who worked in Stamford in the first half of the 19th century. In the summer months, Stamford Meadows attract visitors.

The town has stores, supermarkets, three builders' merchants and several other specialist trade outlets and skilled trades such as roofers, builders, tilers etc. There are two car showrooms and a number of car-related businesses. Local services include convenience stores, post offices, newsagents and take-aways.

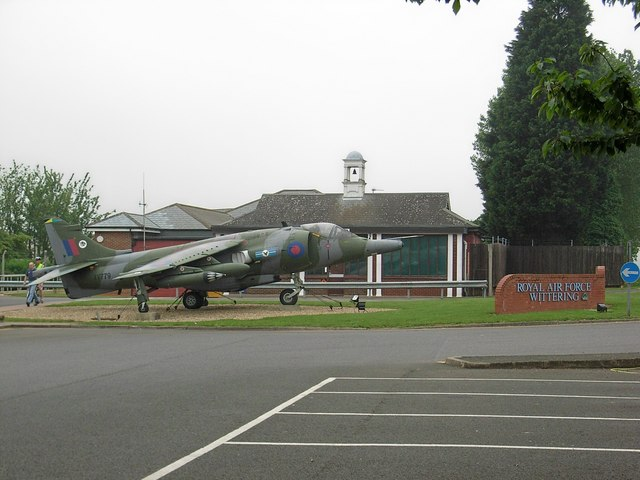
RAF Wittering is nearby to the south, seen here with an RAF Harrier jump jet

=== Engineering ===
South of the town is RAF Wittering, a main employer which was until 2011 the home of the Harrier. The base opened in 1916 as RFC Stamford. It closed in 1919, but reopened in 1924 under its present name.

The engineering company, largely closed since June 2018, is Cummins Generator Technologies (formerly Newage Lyon, then Newage International), a maker of electrical generators in Barnack Road. C & G Concrete (now part of Breedon Aggregates) is in Uffington Road.

The Pick Motor Company was founded in Stamford in about 1898. A number of smaller firms — welders, printers and so forth — feature in collections of industrial units or more traditional premises in older, mixed-use parts of the town. Blackstone & Co was a farm implement and diesel engine manufacturing company.

Stamford lies amidst some of England's richest farmland and close to the famous "double-cropping" land of parts of the fens. Agriculture still provides a small, but steady number of jobs in farming, agricultural machinery, distribution and ancillary services.

=== Media and publishing ===
The Stamford Mercury claims to be "Britain's oldest continuously published newspaper title". The Mercury has been published since 1712 but its masthead formerly claimed it was established in 1695 and still has "Britain's Oldest Newspaper".

Local radio provision was shared between Peterborough's Heart East (102.7 – Heart Peterborough closed in July 2010) and Greatest Hits Radio Midlands (formerly Rutland Radio) (a 97.4 transmitter on Little Casterton Road) from Oakham. Since March 2021, Rutland and Stamford Sound has been providing a locally based service via the internet. Other stations include BBC Radio Cambridgeshire (95.7 from Peterborough), and BBC Radio Lincolnshire (94.9). NOW Digital broadcasts from an East Casterton transmitter covering the town and Spalding, which provides the NOW Peterborough 12D multiplex (BBC Radio Cambridgeshire and Heart East).

Local news and television programmes are provided by BBC East Midlands and ITV Central. Stamford has a lower-power television relay transmitter, due to it being in a valley, which takes its transmission from Waltham, not Belmont. BBC Yorkshire and Lincolnshire and ITV Yorkshire can be received from the Belmont transmitting station.

Local publishers include Key Publishing (aviation) and the Bourne Publishing Group (pets). Old Glory, a specialist magazine for steam power and traction engines, was published in Stamford.

== Landmarks ==
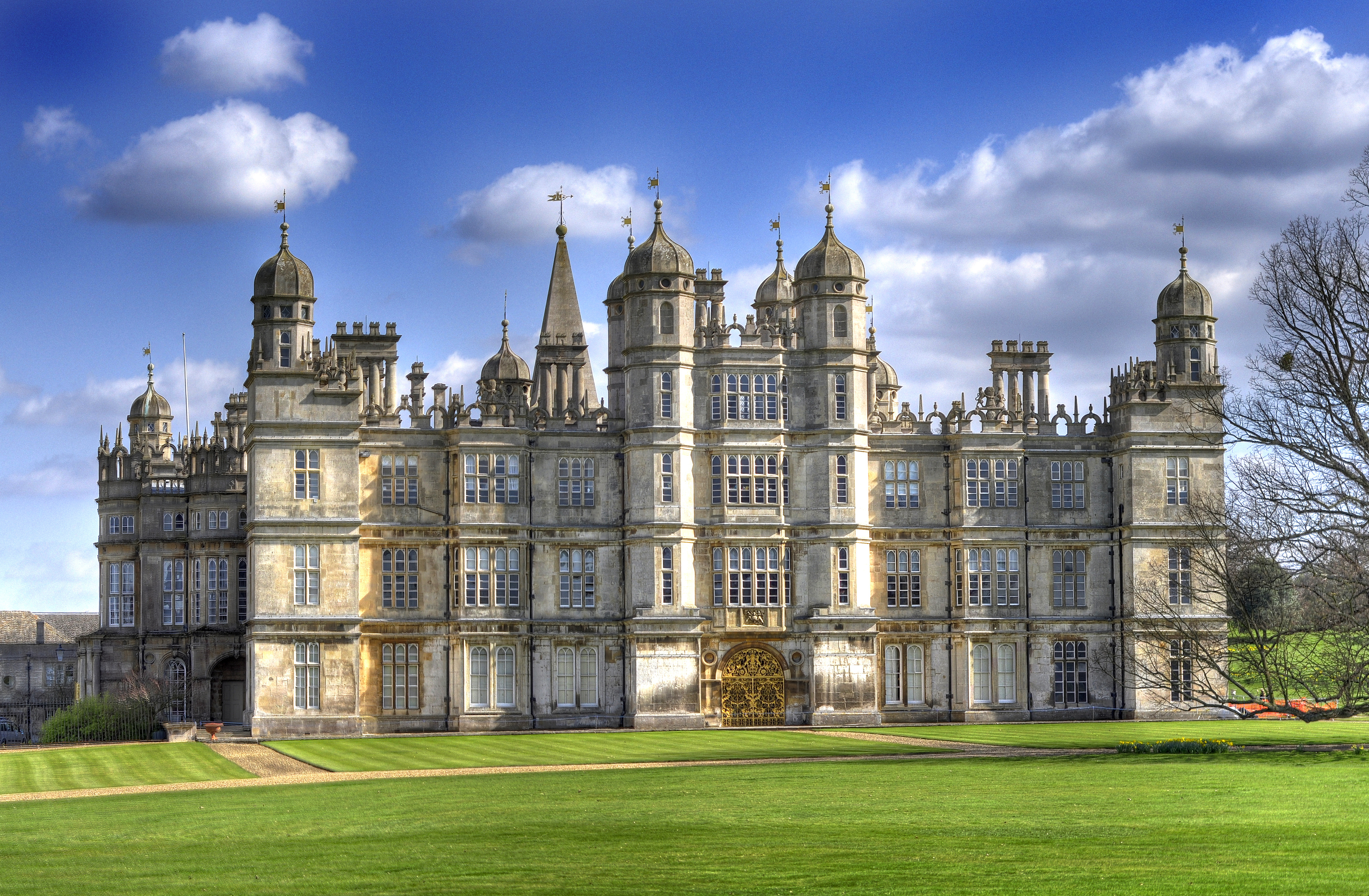
Burghley House

Stamford was the first conservation area designated in England and Wales, under the Civic Amenities Act 1967. There are over 600 listed buildings in and around the town.

St Leonard’s Priory is the oldest building in the town, legendarily founded by Wilfrid, tutor to the son of the Anglo-Saxon King Oswiu. The site retains Norman architectural features, including pillars and arches dating to around 1090, with a west front constructed circa 1150.

Significant unlisted properties include the Corn Exchange in Broad Street which was completed in 1859.

The Industrial Revolution left Stamford largely untouched. Much of the centre was built in the 17th and 18th centuries in Jacobean or Georgian style. It is marked by streets of timber-framed and stone buildings using local limestone and by little shops tucked down back alleys. Several former coaching inns survive, their large doorways being a feature. The main shopping area was pedestrianised in the 1970s.

Near Stamford (but in the historical Soke of Peterborough) is Burghley House, an Elizabethan mansion, built by the First Minister of Elizabeth I, Sir William Cecil, later Lord Burghley. It is the ancestral seat of the Marquess of Exeter. The tomb of William Cecil is in St Martin's Church, Stamford. The parkland of the Burghley Estate adjoins the town on two sides. It includes ancient trees, a population of fallow deer, and vistas designed by landscape architect Capability Brown. Another country house near Stamford, Tolethorpe Hall, hosts outdoor theatre productions by the Stamford Shakespeare Company.

Tobie Norris had a bell foundry in the town in the 17th century. His name is borne by a pub in St Paul's Street.

== Transport ==
=== Railway ===
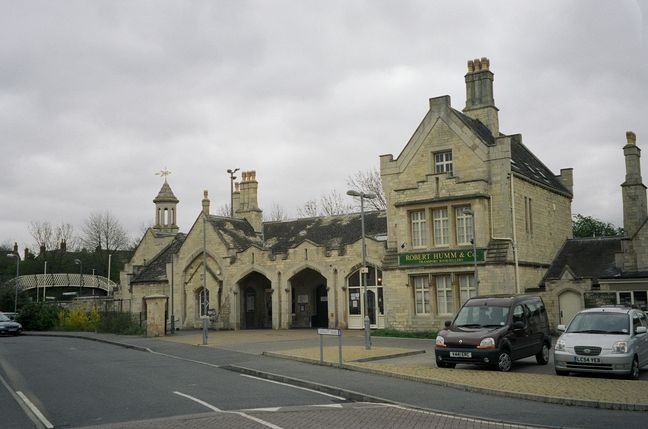
Stamford railway station, before being extensively refurbished by Network Rail and Central Trains; Robert Humm's bookshop has now moved into the town centre

The town is served by Stamford railway station, previously known as Stamford Town to distinguish it from the now closed Stamford East station in Water Street. The station building is a stone structure in Mock Tudor style, influenced by nearby Burghley House and designed by Sancton Wood.

Services are provided by two train operating companies:

- CrossCountry provides regular direct services to Leicester, Birmingham New Street and Stansted Airport, via Cambridge and Peterborough, on the Birmingham to Peterborough Line.
- East Midlands Railway operates a small number of services between Nottingham, Peterborough and Norwich in the mornings and evenings, except on Sundays.

Trains to and from Peterborough pass through a short tunnel beneath St Martin's High Street.

=== Road ===
Lying on the main north–south Ermine Street (now the Great North Road and the A1) from London to York and Edinburgh, Stamford hosted several Parliaments in the Middle Ages. The George Hotel, Bull and Swan, Crown and London Inn were well-known coaching inns. Under a 1776 act, the Great North Road at Stamford was widened from the town bridge to Scotgate, which involved the removal of the old town hall and old bridge gate. The town coped with heavy north–south traffic through its narrow streets until 1960, when a bypass was built to the west of the town. The old route is now the B1081, which has the only other road bridge over the Welland; this is a local bottleneck.

Until 1996, there were plans to upgrade the bypass to motorway standard, but these have been shelved. The Carpenter's Lodge roundabout south of the town has been replaced by a grade-separated junction. The old A16, now the A1175 (Uffington Road) to Market Deeping, meets the northern end of the A43 (Kettering Road) in the south of the town.

=== On foot ===
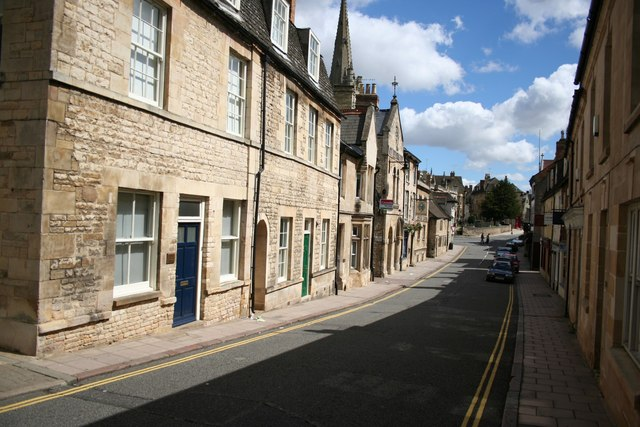
All Saints' Street

Footbridges cross the Welland at the Meadows, some 200 metres upstream of the Town Bridge, and at the Albert Bridge 250 metres downstream.

The Jurassic Way runs from Banbury to Stamford. The Hereward Way runs through the town from Rutland to the Peddars Way in Norfolk, along the Roman Ermine Street and then the River Nene. The Macmillan Way heads through the town, finishing at Boston. Torpel Way follows the railway line, entering Peterborough at Bretton.

=== Buses ===
The town bus station occupies part of the old castle site in St Peter's Hill.

Local bus services are operated by Delaine Buses, Stagecoach, CentreBus, Blands and Peterborough City Council. The main routes run to Peterborough, via Helpston, Wansford, Wittering, Ailsworth, and to Oakham, Grantham, Uppingham and Bourne. On Sundays and Bank Holidays, Peterborough City Council operates a route via Wittering/Wansford, Duddington/Wansford, Burghley House/Barnack/Helpston and Uffington/Barnack/Helpston.

There is a National Express coach service between London and Nottingham each day, including Sundays.

=== Waterways ===
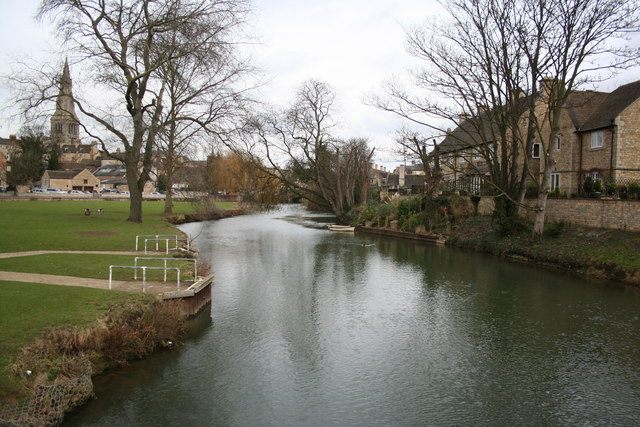
River Welland

Commercial shipping was carried along a canal from Market Deeping to warehouses in Wharf Road until the 1850s. This is no longer possible, due to abandonment of the canal and the shallowness of the river above Crowland. There is a lock at the sluice in Deeping St James, but it is not in use. The river was not conventionally navigable upstream of the Town Bridge.

== Education ==
Stamford has five state primary schools: Bluecoat, St Augustine's (RC), St George's, St Gilbert's and Malcolm Sargent. There is also a fee-paying school: Stamford Junior School.

Stamford's main state secondary school is Stamford Welland Academy (formerly Stamford Queen Eleanor School), formed in the late 1980s from the town's two comprehensive schools: Fane and Exeter. It became an academy in 2011. In April 2013, a group of parents announced an intention to establish a Free School in the town, but failed to receive government backing. Instead, the multi-academy trust that submitted the bid was invited to take over the running of the existing school.

Stamford School is a long-established public school with around 1,200 pupils. Stamford School, originally for boys but converted into a co-educational school, was founded in 1532. The girls' school was established in 1877 and originally known as Browne's Middle School for Girls. The two school formally merged in 2023. Together with Stamford Junior School, they form the Stamford Endowed Schools.

Most of Lincolnshire still has grammar schools. In Stamford, their place was long filled by a form of the Assisted Places Scheme, providing state funding to send children to one of two independent schools in the town that were formerly direct-grant grammars. The national scheme was abolished by the 1997 Labour government. The Stamford arrangements remained in place until funding ended in 2012.

Other secondary pupils travel to Casterton College or further afield to The Deepings School or Bourne Grammar School.

New College Stamford offers post-16 further education: work-based, vocational and academic; and higher education courses including BA degrees in art and design awarded by the University of Lincoln and teaching-related courses awarded by Bishop Grosseteste University. The college also offers a range of informal adult learning.

== Churches ==
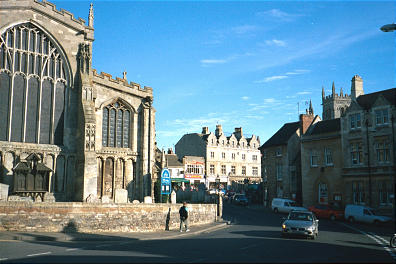
All Saints' Church, Stamford with the wooden war memorial, and Red Lion Square to the right

In the 2011 Census, less than 67 per cent of the population of Stamford identified themselves as Christian, over 25 per cent as of "no religion". Stamford has many current or former churches:

- All Saints' Church on Red Lion Square
- Christ Church, Green Lane
- Stamford and District Community Church (ceased to meet)
- Stamford Free Church (Baptist), Kesteven Road
- St George's Church in St George's Square
- St John the Baptist
- St Leonard's Priory
- St Mary's Church on St Mary's Street
- St Mary and St Augustine (Roman Catholic), on Broad Street
- St Martin's Church on High Street, St Martin's
- St Michael the Greater, High Street (now converted as shops)
- St Paul's Church (now the chapel of Stamford School)
- Strict Baptist Chapel, North Street
- Salvation Army, East Street (now demolished; the congregation worships elsewhere)
- The Church of Jesus Christ of Latter-day Saints, Hillside House, Tinwell Road
- Stamford Methodist Church, Barn Hill (also known as Trinity Methodist Church)
- United Reformed Church, on Star Lane

== Filming location ==
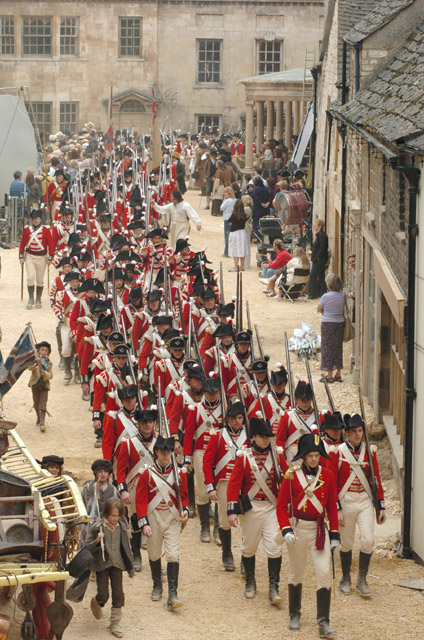
Filming Pride and Prejudice in September 2004

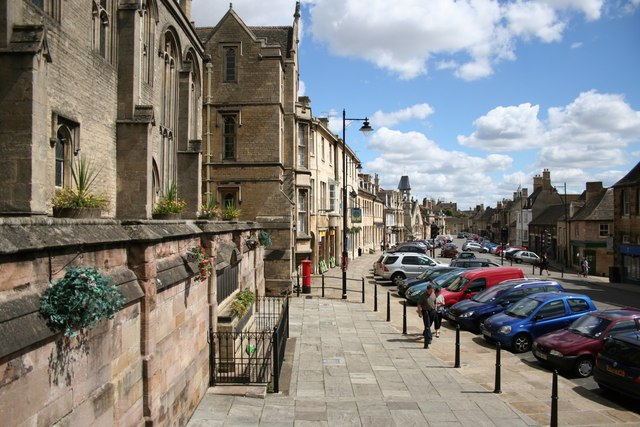
Broad Street looking east

=== Television shows ===
- Middlemarch (1994)
- The Buccaneers (1995)
- The Golden Bowl (2000)
- Bleak House (2005)
- My Mad Fat Diary (2013–2015)

=== Films ===
- Pride & Prejudice (2005) – used as the village of Meryton
- The Da Vinci Code (2006)
- The Golden Bowl (2000)

== Notable residents ==
In alphabetical order by section. References appear on each person's page.

=== Arts and broadcasting ===
- Michael Asher (born 1953), author and explorer
- Torben Betts (born 1968), playwright
- Nelson Dawson (1859–1941), artist
- Colin Dexter (1930–2017), author, creator of Inspector Morse
- Rae Earl (born 1971), author and broadcaster
- Lady Angela Forbes (1876–1950), novelist and First World War forces sweetheart
- Hannah Gold, bestselling children's author
- Andrew Lycett (born 1948), biographer
- James Mayhew (born 1964), writer and illustrator of children's books
- Mahomet Thomas Phillips (1876-1943), Anglo/Congolese sculptor and carver
- Wilfrid Wood (1888–1976), artist

=== Business ===
- John Drakard (c. 1775–1854), newspaper proprietor
- Arthur Kitson (1859–1937), managing director of Kitson Empire Lighting Company and monetary theorist

=== Crime ===
- John George Haigh (1909–1949), "The Acid Bath Murderer", was born in Stamford.

=== Government and armed forces ===
- William Cecil, 1st Baron Burghley (1520–1598), Elizabethan statesman
- Sir Mike Jackson (1944-2024), British Army general

=== Medicine ===
- Percy Roycroft Lowe (1870–1948), surgeon and ornithologist, born in Stamford
- William Newman (surgeon), (1833–1903), doctor and surgeon at the Stamford and Rutland Infirmary

=== Performance ===
- Sarah Cawood (born 1972), television presenter
- James Bradshaw (born 1976) stage and television actor
- Tom Butcher (born 1963) stage film and television actor
- Tom Ford, broadcaster and presenter of 5th Gear
- Colin Furze (born 1979), YouTube personality, twice a Guinness World Record holder
- David Jackson (born 1947), progressive rock saxophonist, flautist and composer
- Nicola Roberts (born 1985), singer, best known as a member of Girls Aloud
- George Robinson (born 1997), actor
- Sir Malcolm Sargent (1895–1967), conductor
- Sir Michael Tippett (1905–1998), composer

=== Scholarship ===
- Harry Burton (1879–1940), Egyptologist and archaeological photographer
- Robert of Ketton (с. 1110 – с. 1160), medieval theologian, the first European translator of the Quran.
- Ian Roberts (born 1957), professor of linguistics at the University of Cambridge.

=== Sports ===
- David Cecil, 6th Marquess of Exeter (Lord Burghley till 1956; 1905–1981), politician, Governor of Bermuda, and Gold Medal-winning hurdler at 1928 Summer Olympics
- Malcolm Christie (born 1979), former professional footballer
- Darren Ferguson (born 1972), manager of Peterborough United, son of Alex Ferguson
- Thomas Goodrich (1823–1885), cricketer
- David Norris (born 1981), former professional footballer
- Paul Rawden (born 1973), former cricketer
- M. J. K. Smith (born 1933), captain of England cricket team and last English double international (cricket and rugby), attended Stamford School.

== Sport ==
=== Football teams ===
- Blackstones F.C.
- Stamford A.F.C.
- Stamford Belvedere F.C.

There are a number of junior teams in each age group and also school teams.

=== Rugby teams ===
- Stamford College Old Boys R.F.C.
- Stamford College Rugby Team
- Stamford Rugby Club

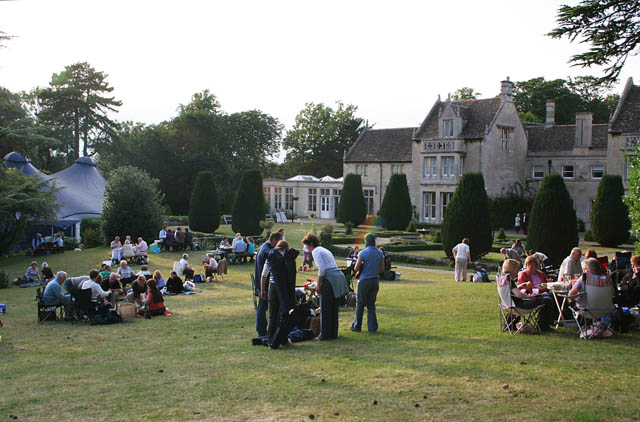
Tolethorpe Hall in nearby Little Casterton

=== Cricket teams ===
- Burghley Park Cricket Club
- Stamford Town Cricket Club

== Festivals and events ==
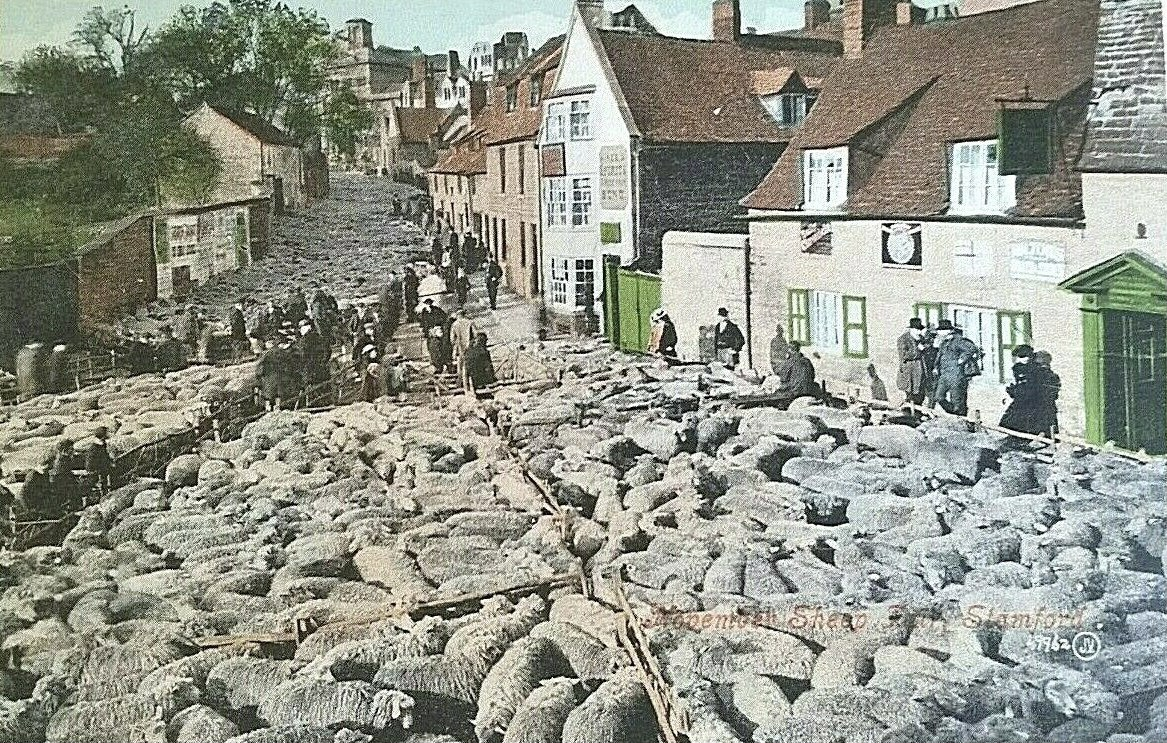
November Sheep Fair, Stamford, c. 1905

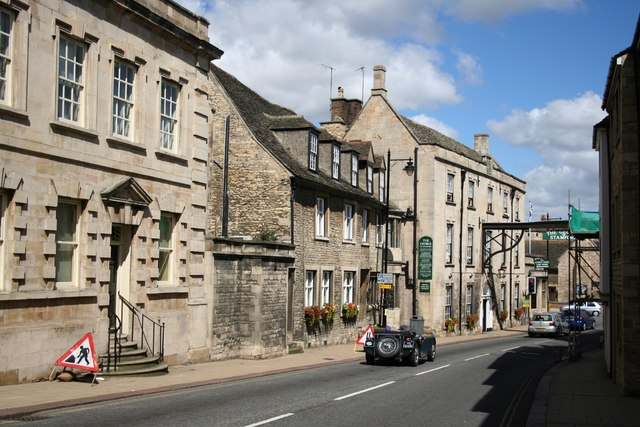
George Hotel, Stamford

- Burghley Horse Trials, held annually in early September
- Stamford Blues Festival
- Stamford International Music Festival held in the spring
- Stamford Riverside Festival, last held in 2010
- Stamford Mid Lent Fair
- Stamford Georgian Festival, held in September
- Stamford Diversity Festival, held in 2021
- Lazy Crow Music Festival, held in June

== See also ==
- Blackstone & Co
- Outline of England
- Kings Mill, Stamford
- Niagara Falls, Ontario – Part of the area was named Stamford by John Graves Simcoe in 1791.

=== Community groups ===
Stamford Cycling is a community cycling group based in Stamford, affiliated with Cycling UK since 2025. The group promotes recreational cycling, organises regular group social rides, and fosters a welcoming environment for cyclists of all skill levels.
