= Anthony Ewbank =

British judge (1925–2011)

Sir Anthony Ewbank QC

Sir Anthony Bruce Ewbank (30 July 1925 – 25 June 2011) was a British Judge of the High Court of Justice, Family Division.

== Life ==
Anthony Bruce Ewbank was born on 30 July 1925, the son of Rev. Harold Ewbank and Gwendolen Ewbank (née Bruce). He was educated at St John's School, Leatherhead, before going up to Trinity College, Cambridge, where he graduated in the Natural Sciences Tripos. In 1945 he joined the Royal Naval Volunteer Reserve and subsequently contributed to the purchase of a Tiger Moth aircraft with nine other officers, on which he learnt to fly.

Ewbank became a schoolmaster at Stamford School in 1947 before joining the staff of Epsom College in 1950. He was called to the bar at Gray's Inn in 1954, the objective to improve his chance of obtaining a headmastership. However, serving his pupillage under Roger Ormrod he decided to practise and, on entering chambers, became a specialist in divorce and probate. He pressed successfully to change the law so that divorced women could receive a share of their former husband’s pension.

Ewbank was made Junior Counsel to the Treasury in probate law in 1969, Queen's Counsel in 1972 and a Recorder of the Crown Court between 1975 and 1980. He was Chairman of the Family Law Bar Association between 1978 and 1980. Ewbank was made Knight Bachelor in 1980.

== Personal life ==
In 1958, Ewbank married Moya McGinn with whom he had four sons and one daughter. He enjoyed swimming and sailing. He died on 25 June 2011, and is buried alongside Moya at Whitehill Burial Ground, Goring-on-Thames.
