= William Browne (mayor of the Calais Staple) =

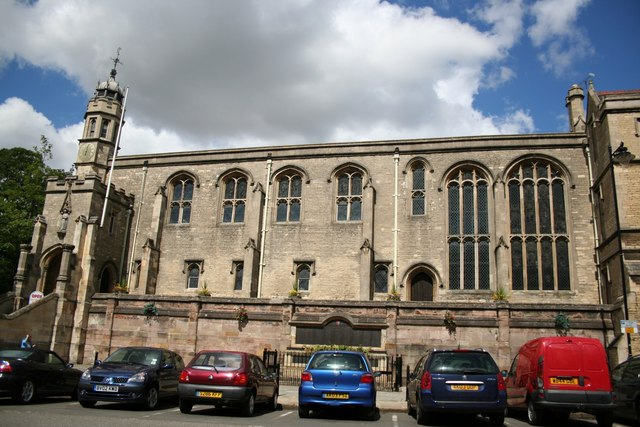
Browne's Hospital, Stamford

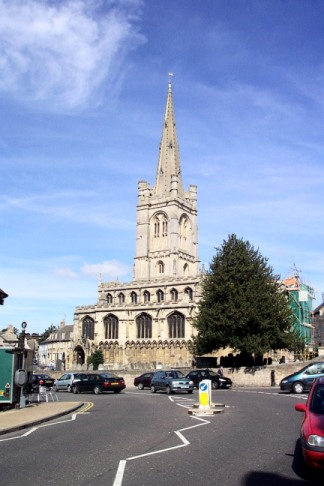
The steeple of All Saints' Church, Stamford was funded and built by Browne.

Sir William Browne (1410 – 14 April 1489) was Lord Mayor and Merchant of the Staple of Calais, France; and founder of Browne's Hospital, a medieval almshouse and listed building in Stamford, Lincolnshire, England.

== Career ==
Browne was a rich wool merchant. He was alderman of Stamford, in 1435, 1444, 1449, 1460, 1466, and 1470. In 1465, he funded and built the steeple of All Saints' Church, Stamford, the church having been erected by his father. Browne served as sheriff of Rutland in 1467, 1475, 1483, and 1486, and probably also sheriff of Lincolnshire in 1478. In 1485, he was authorised by letters patent of Richard III to found and endow an almshouse. Four years later, after Browne's death and that of his wife, Margaret, the management of the Hospital passed to her brother, Thomas Stokke, Canon of York and Rector of Easton-on-the-Hill. Stokke obtained new letters patent from Henry VII in 1493. Browne's Hospital ("Old Bead House") was completed in that year and dedicated the following year.

== Personal life ==
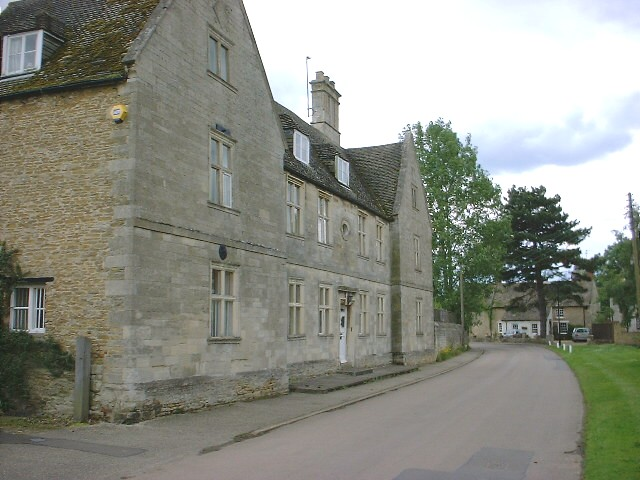
Browne's wife was heiress of the manor of Warmington.

He descended from the family of Brownes of Rutland. His parents were John (d. 1442) and Margaret (d. 1460) Browne. There was at least one sibling, a younger brother, John Browne. William Browne married Dame Margaret Stock (or Stokke, or Stokes) (d. 28 October 1489), heiress of the manor house of Warmington. They had at least two children, daughters Agnes and Elizabeth (c. 1441–1511) who married Sir John Elmes and lived at Lilford Hall. Browne and his wife both died in 1489, and were buried in All Saints' Church's south chapel.
