= St Leonard's Priory, Stamford =

Priory in Stamford, Lincolnshire, England

Coordinates: 52.6541°N 0.4656°W

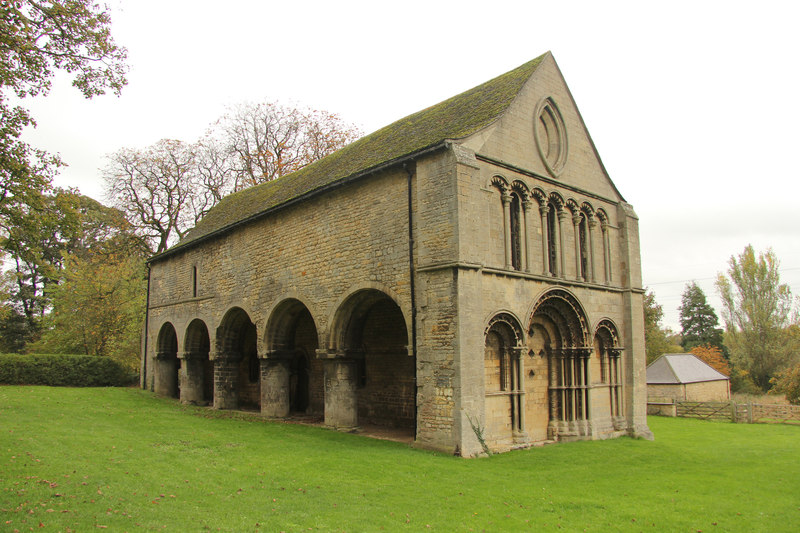
St Leonard's Priory

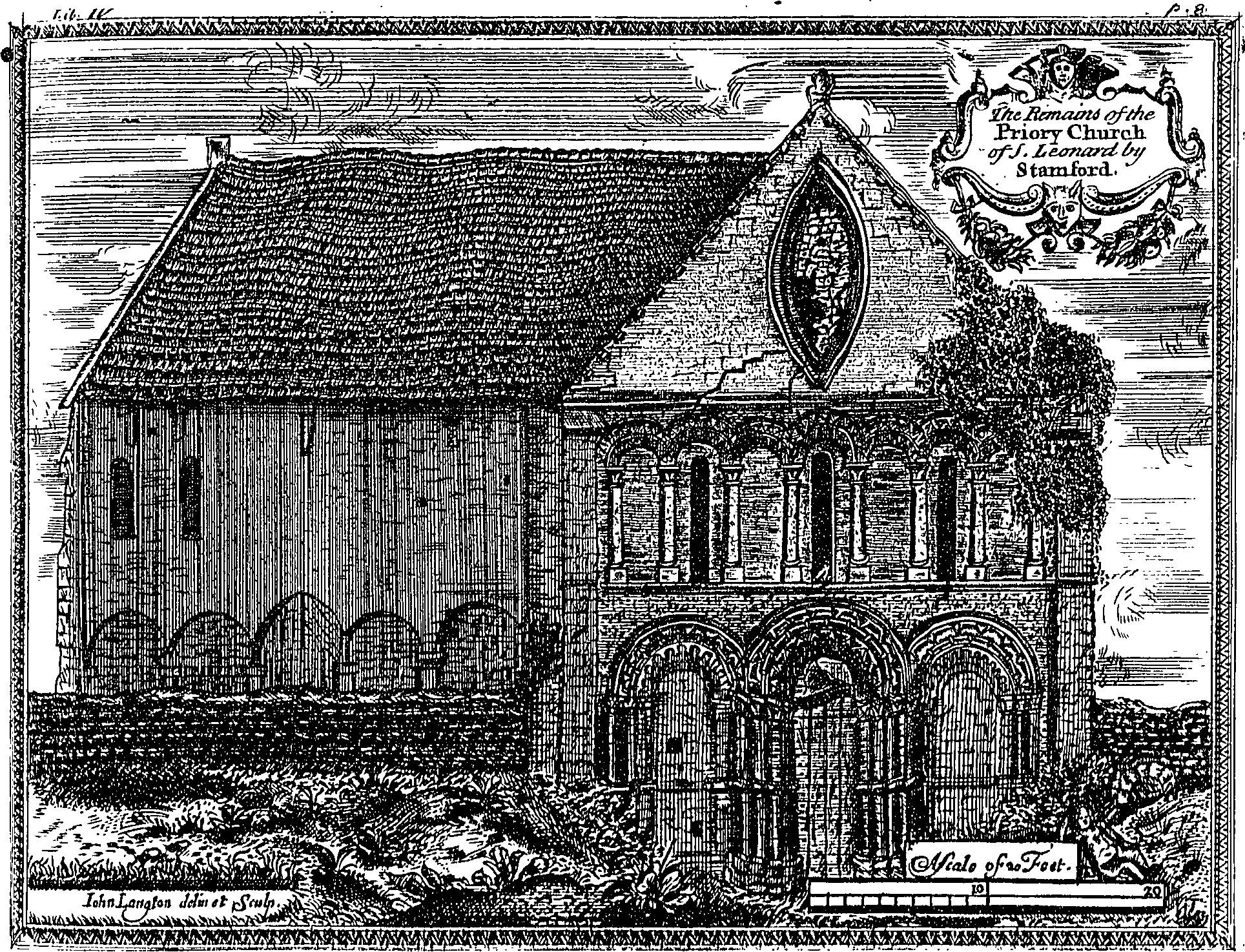
Remains of the priory church from Francis Peck's Academia tertia Anglicana (1727)

St Leonard's Priory, Stamford was a priory in Lincolnshire, England. It was built in Stamford, supposedly on the site of a monastery which was founded by St Wilfrid in 658 and destroyed in the Danish invasion.

It was jointly refounded by William the Conqueror and William de St-Calais, the Bishop of Durham, in c1082 and remained a cell of Durham until its dissolution in 1538.

Part of the fine transitional west front and north arcade of the church survive. The ruins and site of St Leonard's Priory is a Scheduled Monument and the structure is a Grade I listed building.

== See also ==
- Greyfriars, Stamford
