= Robert Wardle =

Robert Wardle was Director of the Serious Fraud Office of England and Wales. He was appointed on 21 April 2003 and had previously been Assistant Director for eleven years. He had been a member of the SFO since it was created in 1988. Previously he was a solicitor at the Crown Prosecution Service.

He was reappointed for a further year from April 2007.

He attended Stamford School
