= Oliver Hemsley =

English businessman and entrepreneur (born 1962)

Oliver Hemsley (born 1962) is an English businessman and entrepreneur, and former chief executive of Numis Corporation.

He is the son of a Rutland pig farmer, and attended Stamford School in Lincolnshire. His godfather got him a job as an infill for an office junior at a Lloyd's marine broker, which became the Brockbank Group, and stayed.

He set up Hemsley & Co Securities in 1990 to provide the Lloyd's of London insurance market with much-needed fresh capital. Shortly afterwards, he bought Raphael Zorn, an old City broker with a mixed reputation. This brought with it a private client side, which provided a useful separate income stream.

This business was sold in March 2000, and Hemsley set out to expand Numis — the Latin word for coin — into other areas. The sale had reduced the workforce from 70 to only 12, but the events of September 11, 2001, meant that the insurance sector was again in need of recapitalisation. Now Numis employs about 160 people.
