= Merchants of the Staple =

The Company of Merchants of the Staple of England, the Merchants of the Staple, also known as the Merchant Staplers, is an English company incorporated by Royal Charter in 1319 (and so the oldest mercantile corporation in England) dealing in wool, skins, lead and tin which controlled the export of wool to the continent during the late medieval period. The company of the staple may perhaps trace its ancestry back to Merchant Guilds as far as 1248 or even further.

== History ==
From 1314, the Crown required all wool for export to be traded at a designated market, called 'The Staple'. This allowed the Crown to monitor the trade and levy tax on exports. A prominent merchant, called the Mayor of the Staple was charged with running the Staple for the Crown.

The staple was first fixed at Antwerp then successively moved to Saint-Omer, Bruges, Brussels, Louvain, Mechelen and Calais. In 1353 the staple was fixed at Westminster which drew so much business it was raised to the dignity of a town, in 1378 it was removed to Staple Inn, Holborn where it continued.

=== The staple at Calais ===
After Calais was conquered in 1347 by the English, Calais was the staple from 1363, after that right had been assigned in turns to Bruges and Antwerp in the first half of the 14th century. A group of twenty-six traders was incorporated as the Company of the Staple at Calais. In exchange for its cooperation in the payment of taxes, the company was granted a total monopoly on wool exports from England. The company was important to the English crown, both as a source of revenue, and through its role in the defence of Calais against the French.

As domestic cloth production increased, raw wool exports were less important, diminishing the power of the Merchants. In 1558, with the loss of Calais to the French, the staple was transferred to Bruges where the Merchant Staplers continued to enjoy their monopoly on exports. However, in 1614, export of raw wool was banned entirely during the Cockayne Project under the direction of William Cockayne and wool was traded only in domestic staples. The project failed however, because the States-General of the Netherlands banned the import of cloth from England. In 1617 the English lifted their ban, but the Dutch ban remained in place. The Merchant Staplers continued to exist, but only in local markets.

== 21st century ==
The Company still exists, based in Yorkshire, and makes charitable contributions through bursaries and awards to charities involved in the wool business such as the Nuffield Trust, and to educational travel.

== Notable staplers ==
Richard Whittington, Lord Mayor of London, was simultaneously Mayor of the Calais Staple, an office also held by William Browne (1410–1489); Sir Henry Keble, Lord Mayor of London under Henry VIII; Thomas Davenport, Mayor of Leicester, was also a Stapler, as was Henry Plankney (c. 1480–1535) from Grayingham, Lincolnshire. The surviving letters of John Johnson of the manor of Glapthorn, Northamptonshire, provide an insight into the life of a sixteenth-century merchant of the Staple.

== See also ==
- List of Merchants of the Staple
- Statute of the Staple
- History of the English fiscal system § Indirect taxation
