= Calais Staple =

The Calais Staple was the centre of England's medieval wool trade, linking royal finance, the power of the Merchants of the Staple and the strategic defence of England’s last continental possession. In 1376 the Good Parliament decreed that the wool staple should return to the Pale of Calais.

== Sources ==
- Lloyd, T. H. (1977). The English Wool Trade in the Middle Ages. Cambridge: Cambridge University Press. ISBN 978-0-52121-239-7.
