= St John the Baptist's Church, Stamford =

Coordinates: 52.6518°N 0.4800°W

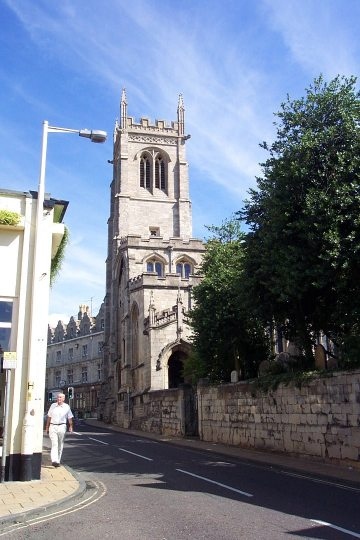
- St John the Baptist's Church, Stamford

- Location in Lincolnshire
- OS grid reference: TF 030 070
- Location: Stamford, Lincolnshire
- Country: England
- Denomination: Anglican
- Website: Churches Conservation Trust

History
- Dedication: Saint John the Baptist

Architecture
- Functional status: Redundant
- Heritage designation: Grade I
- Designated: 22 May 1954
- Architectural type: Church
- Style: Perpendicular

Specifications
- Materials: Limestone

St John the Baptist's Church is a redundant Anglican church in the centre of the town of Stamford, Lincolnshire, England. It is recorded in the National Heritage List for England as a designated Grade I listed building, and is under the care of the Churches Conservation Trust.

== History ==
The church originated in the 12th century, and a small amount of fabric from that time is incorporated in its structure. The tower was built at an uncertain time before the 15th century. The building of the rest of the church took place during the 15th century and was completed in 1451. At this time the town was prosperous because of its wool and cloth trade. The town was badly damaged by Lancastrian forces during the War of the Roses in 1461, but St John's was apparently unharmed. The bellframe was rebuilt between about 1680 and 1710. The interior was re-fitted during the 18th century. In 1856 it was restored in the High church tradition by the local architect Edward Browning, who had also worked on other churches nearby. There were further restorations in 1867, in 1897–99 when Browning's painted decoration in the chancel was removed, and in 1903, when a vestry was added. In 1950–53 the north arcade was partly rebuilt, and the parapet of the tower was renewed. The work on the arcade was made necessary because of subsidence caused by the collapse of burial vaults beneath them. This work was carried out by E. Bowman and Sons. The church was declared redundant in 2003, and more repairs have been carried out since that time.

== Architecture ==
=== Exterior ===
St John's is constructed in limestone ashlar with lead roofs. Its plan consists of a nave with north and south aisles and a clerestory, a south porch, a chancel with north and south chapels, a south vestry, and a west tower which is incorporated in the west bay of the north aisle. The exterior is entirely Perpendicular in style. The tower is in five stages, and may have been altered in the 15th century to match the rest of the building. It has clasping buttresses, and an embattled parapet with tall pinnacles. The bell openings have two lights. The chancel, nave and aisles are also embattled, and all the windows date from the 15th century. The south porch is shallow and richly decorated. Its parapet again is embattled, with pinnacles and gargoyles.

=== Interior ===
Only a small amount of 12th-century fabric remains, most of the interior of the church and the fittings being from the 15th century. The roof of the nave is finely carved, including angels on the bosses. The font is octagonal, with a 17th-century cover which is embellished with a conical spire with crockets. There is a piscina in the chancel, and another in the south aisle. The pulpit dates from 1953, and was donated by the restorers of the church at that time. The benches in the nave and the choir stalls are by Browning. Between the east ends of the aisles and the chapels are screens dating from the 15th century.

Some of the glass dates from 1451; this was cleaned and re-set in 1974. Other glass dates from the 19th and 20th centuries, and includes the east and west windows of 1856 by Francis Wilson Oliphant, and windows by Heaton, Butler and Bayne, and by Clayton and Bell. The memorials include a brass dated 1489, and wall tablets from the 18th and early 19th centuries. The organ was built by Bevington in 1870, and a third manual was added two years later by Hill and Son. In 1974 it was restored by Hill, Norman and Beard. There is a ring of four bells. The oldest bell dates from 1550, two were cast in 1561 by Newcombe and Watts, and the fourth bell is dated 1814 and was cast by Robert Taylor.

== See also ==
- List of churches preserved by the Churches Conservation Trust in the East of England
