= Browne's Hospital, Stamford =

Browne's Hospital
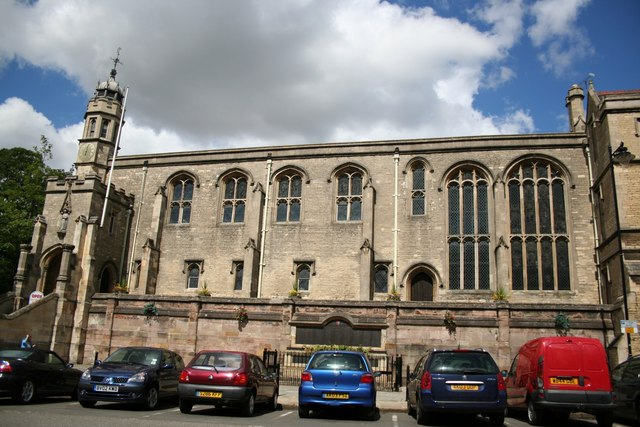
- The exterior from Broad Street

- Location within Lincolnshire
- 52°39′08″N 00°28′52″W
- Location: Stamford, Lincolnshire, England

History
- Built: 1475

Site notes
- Restored: ca1870
- Restored by: James Fowler
- Governing body: Hospital of William Browne

Listed Building – Grade II*
- Designated: 1954

Browne's Hospital is a medieval almshouse in Stamford, Lincolnshire, England. It was founded in 1485 by wealthy wool merchant William Browne to provide a home and a house of prayer for twelve poor men and two poor women.

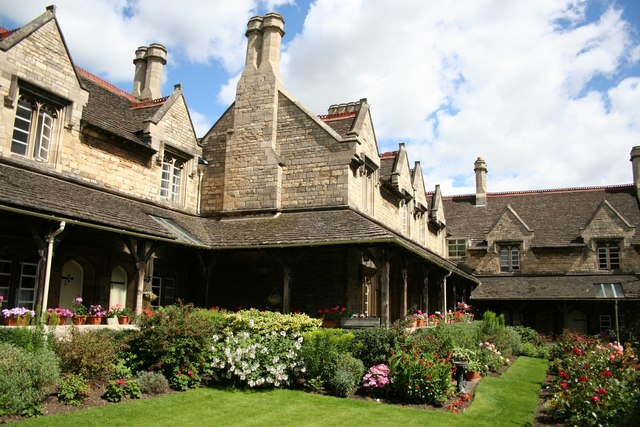
The garden

A stork in a glass window

== History ==
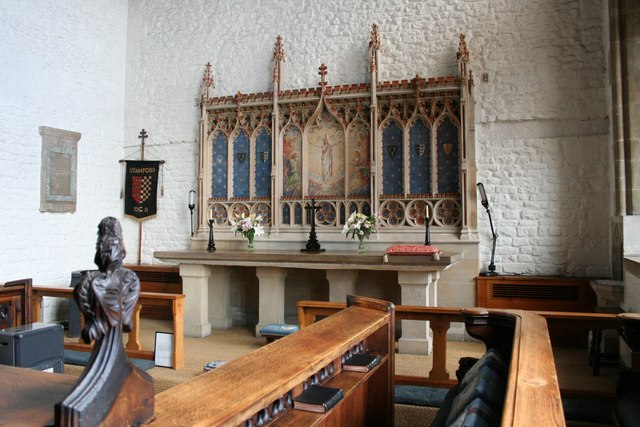
Browne's Hospital Chapel

The Hospital, Bedehouse or Domus Dei was established in 1475 during reign of Edward IV as a home and a house of prayer for ten poor men and two poor women, with a Warden and Confrater, both of whom were to be secular priests. The statutes required attendance at chapel twice daily, where masses for the repose of the souls of the Founders were said. A new charter was granted by James I in 1610.

The Hospital was richly endowed with property and agricultural land in the neighbourhood. Some of the funds were appropriated by Act of Parliament in 1871 for the foundation of Stamford High School and the further endowment of Stamford School. The endowment is commemorated in the name of a Stamford School house.

The Hospital is today home to twelve residents. The Victorian cottages around the courtyard garden were updated in 1963 to flats, each with a living room, bedroom, kitchen and bathroom. It is a Registered Charity and is managed by a board of governors and trustees. The Hospital is opened to the public at weekends and bank holidays during the summer. Visitors may see the Common Room where the men lived, the Chapel with its original stained-glass, the Audit Room and the Confrater's Sitting Room, all with original furnishings. The adjacent Warden's House, built c. 1870 to the designs of James Fowler, is separately listed as Grade II. It is now rented for office use.

In 1994 it was used for filming, portraying Middlemarch Hospital in George Eliot's Middlemarch, most of which was filmed in Stamford.
