= Mayor of the Calais Staple =

The mayor of the Calais Staple was the head of the merchants of English-occupied Calais from 1363 to 1558. The actual rule over Calais was in the hands of the captains, lieutenants and lords deputies. Among the mayors of the Calais Staple we find:

- Mid-14th century: John Curteys
- 1394: Robert Savage
- 1407: Dick Whittington
- 1434: Hamon Sutton
- Unknown date, second half 14th century: John Torngold
- Sir Thomas Seymour, MP for City of London, Lord Mayor of London and Mayor of the Calais Staple in 1523.
