= Josias Simmler =

Swiss theologian

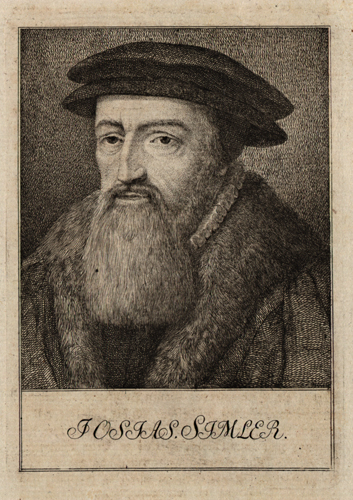
- Simmler engraving after Heinrich Pfenninger
- Born: 6 November 1530; Kappel
- Died: 2 July 1576 (aged 45); Zürich
- Occupations: Theologian, humanist scholar

Josias Simmler (Josiah Simler; Latin: Iosias Simlerus) (6 November 1530 – 2 July 1576) was a Swiss theologian and classicist, author of the first book relating solely to the Alps.

== Life ==
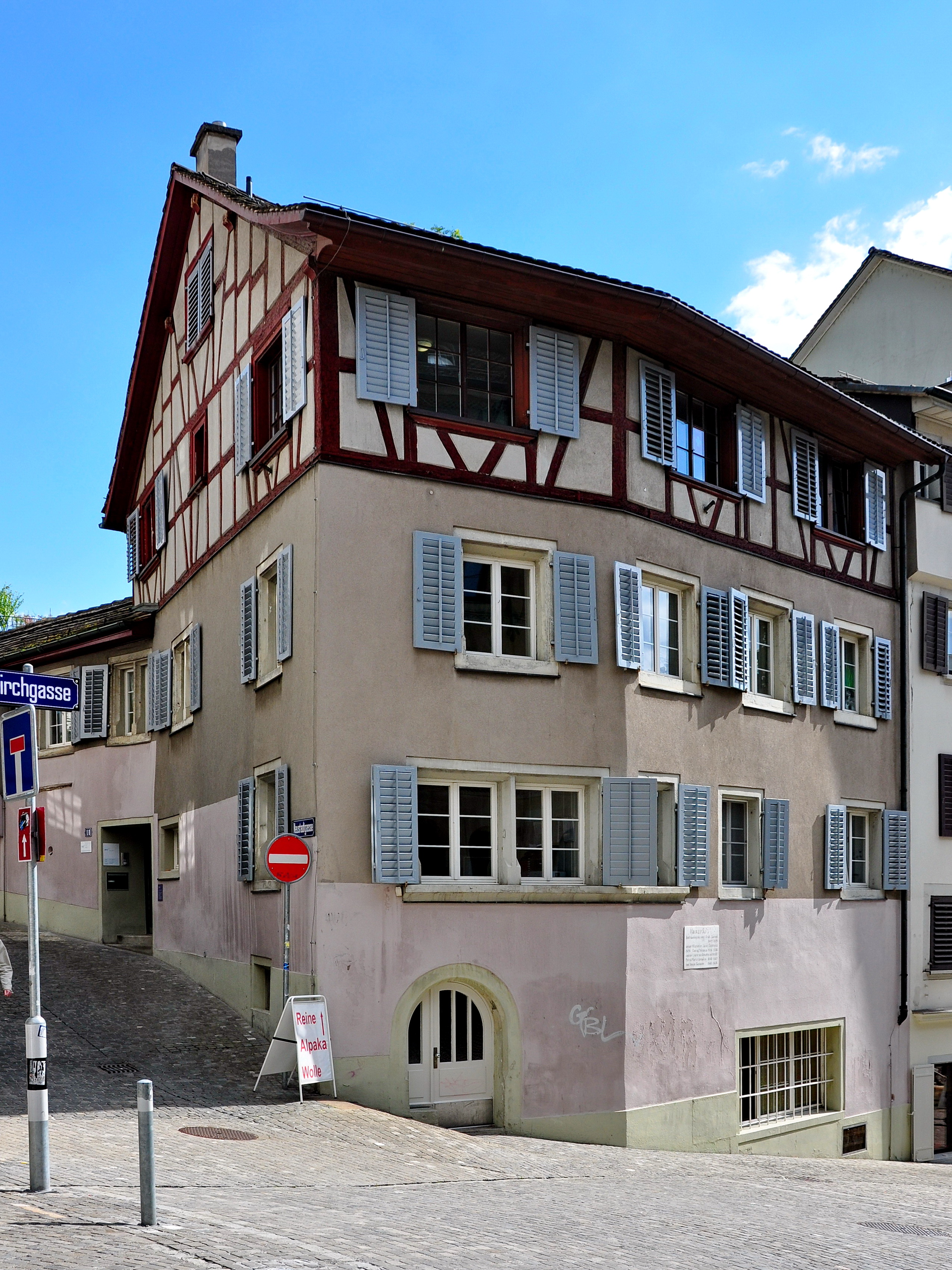
«Haus zur Sul»: Official residence of Ulrich Zwingli (1522–1525) and his co-workers Jakob Ceporin (1526) and Konrad Pellikan (1526–1556), and later of Peter Martyr Vermigli (1556–1562) and Josias Simmler (1563-1576), professors at the Carolinum, the academy of the Grossmünster.

The son of the former prior of the Cistercian convent of Kappel (Canton of Zürich), he was born at Kappel, where his father was the Protestant pastor and schoolmaster till his death in 1557. In 1544 Simmler went to Zürich to continue his education under his godfather, the reformer, Heinrich Bullinger. After having completed his studies at Basel and Strasbourg, he returned to Zürich, and became pastor to the neighboring villages.

In 1552 he was made professor of New Testament exegesis at Zürich's Carolinum academy, where he also taught mathematics and Ptolemaic astronomy, and in 1560 became professor of theology. In 1555 he published a new edition of Conrad Gessner's Epitome of his Bibliotheca universalis (a list of all authors who had written in Greek, Latin or Hebrew), a new edition of the Bibliotheca itself, and in 1575 an annotated edition of the Antonine Itinerary. Later, he would become deacon to St Peter's, Zürich. and translated many of Bullinger's works into Latin, and write his biography. In 1559 he had his first attack of gout, a complaint which would eventually kill him.

== Contributions to Swiss studies ==
About 1551 he conceived the idea of making his native land better known by translating into Latin parts of the great Chronik of Johann Stumpf. With this view he collected materials, and in 1574 published a specimen of his intended work in the shape of a monograph on the Canton of the Valais. He published in the same volume a general description of the Alps, as the Introduction to his projected work on the several Swiss Cantons. In this treatise, entitled De Alpibus commentarius, he collected all that the classical authors had written on the Alps, adding a good deal of material collected from his friends and correspondents. This Commentarius is the first work exclusively devoted to the Alps, and sums up the knowledge of that region possessed in the 16th century.

It was re-published by the Elzevirs at Leiden in 1633, and again at Zürich in 1735, while an elaborate annotated edition (prepared by Mr Coolidge), with French translation, notes and appendices, appeared at Grenoble in 1904. Another fragment of his vast plan was the work entitled De Helvetiorum republica, which appeared at Zürich in 1576, just before his death. It was regarded as the chief authority on Swiss constitutional matters up to 1798. In 1566 he wrote a biography of his friend Conrad Gessner, shortly after his death the previous year.

== Works ==
- De aeterno Dei filio. Zürich, 1568 (VD 16 S 6498).
- De Republica Helvetiorum Libri duo. Zürich: Christoph Froschauer, 1576 (VD 16 S 6510).
- De Republica Helvetiorum Libri duo. Zürich, 1577 (VD 16 S 6511).
- Regiment Gemeiner loblicher Eydgnoschafft. Zürich, 1576 (VD16 S 6512)
- Simler, Josias (1566). Vita clarissimi philosophi et medici excellentissimi Conradi Gesneri Tigurini a Josia Simlero Tigurin. Item epistola Gesneri de libris a se editis (VD16 S 6520). Tiguri: C Froschoverum.
- Vallesiae descriptio, libri duo: de alpibus commentarius. Zürich, 1574 (VD16 S 6519).

== Bibliography ==
- Backus, Irena (2016). "3: Zurich lives in the latter part of the sixteenth century - The biography of Gesner by Simler". Life Writing in Reformation Europe: Lives of Reformers by Friends, Disciples and Foes. Routledge. pp. 157–161. ISBN 978-1-317-10518-3.
- Wellisch, Hans (Hanan) (June 1975). "Conrad Gessner: a bio-bibliography". Journal of the Society for the Bibliography of Natural History. 7 (2): 151–247. doi:10.3366/jsbnh.1975.7.2.151.
- Marabello, Thomas Quinn (2023) "The Origins of Democracy in Switzerland," Swiss American Historical Society Review, Vol. 59: No. 1, Available at: https://scholarsarchive.byu.edu/sahs_review/vol59/iss1/4. See Pg. 97-99.
