= John Anthony =

John Anthony may refer to:

- Sir John Anthony (provost) (1862–1935), Scottish businessman who served as provost of Govan, 1904–1908
- John Anthony (physician) (1585–1655), English physician
- John Anthony (interpreter) (c. 1766–1805), Chinese-born British naturalised interpreter
- John Gould Anthony (1804–1877), United States naturalist
- John Anthony (sport shooter) (1932–2009), British Olympic shooter
- John Anthony (record producer) (born 1944), British music producer
- John Anthony (footballer) (born 1953), Australian rules footballer for St Kilda
- John D. Anthony (born 1976), Illinois politician
- Jack Anthony (footballer) (born 1988), Australian rules footballer for Collingwood and Fremantle

== See also ==
- Jack Anthony (disambiguation)
