= Muffet =

Muffet may refer to:

- "Little Miss Muffet", a nursery rhyme
- Muffet McGraw, American basketball coach
- Thomas Muffet, English naturalist
- Muffet, character in Undertale
