= Thomas Penny =

English physician and entomologist (1532–1589)

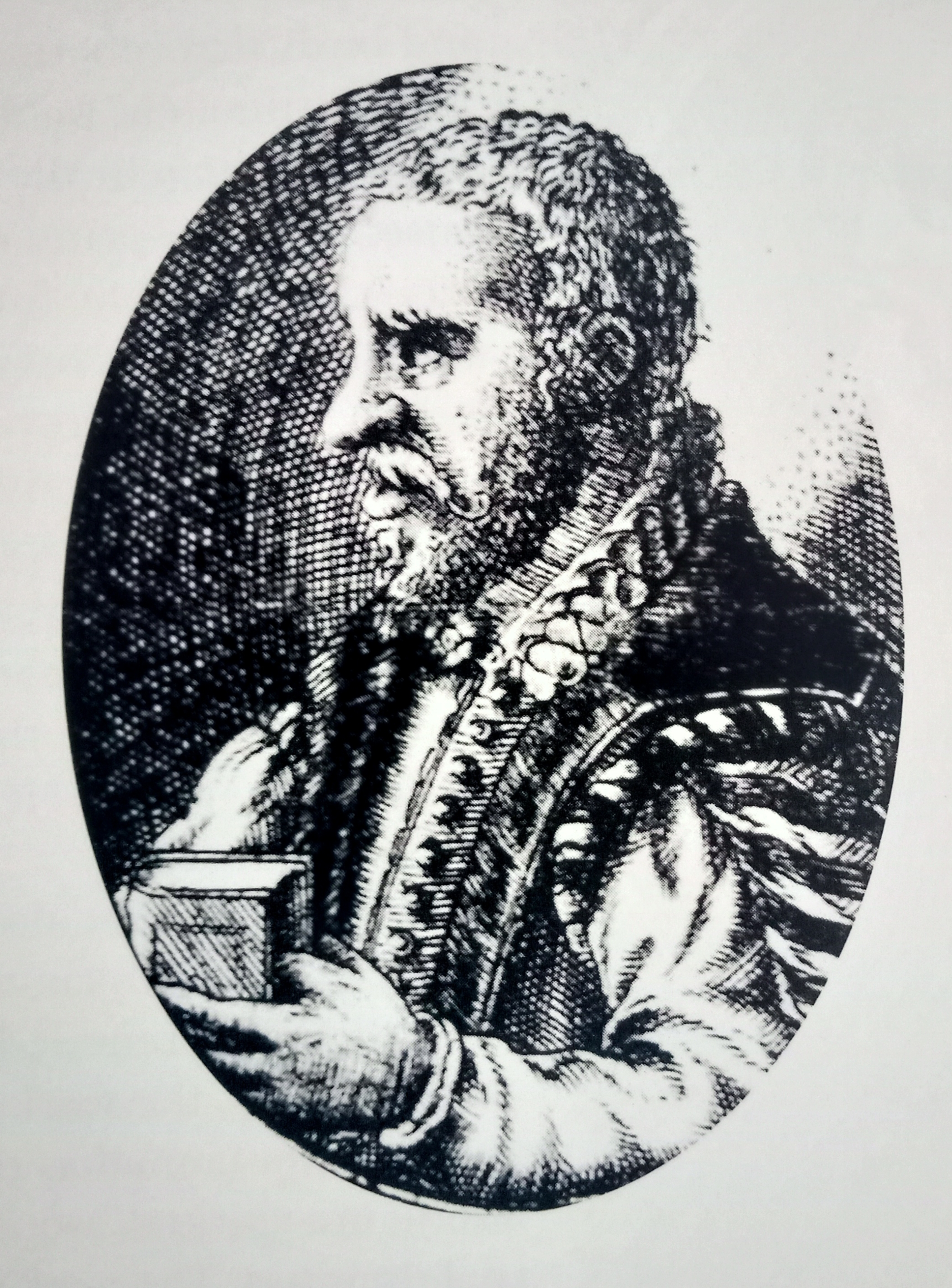
Engraving by William Rogers, c. 1600

Thomas Penny (1532 – January 1589) was an English physician and early entomologist. His solo works have not survived and he is primarily known through quotations from other sixteenth-century biologists. It is believed that he broke with Aristotle on classification of caterpillars. He was also a Puritan and as such kept a low profile during the reign of Queen Mary I of England. He is perhaps best known for being partly responsible for the Insectorum, sive, Minimorum animalium theatrum or Theatre of Insects. This work was written jointly by Conrad Gessner (posthumously), Edward Edward Wotton, Thomas Muffet, and Thomas Penny.

== Family ==
Thomas was the son of John Penny or Penne of Eskrigg in Gressingham, in Lancashire. He had a younger brother, Brian Penny, who was later in the service of another native of Gressingham : Edmund Scambler, bishop of Peterborough between 1561 and 1584. Thomas Penny also had two sisters : Anne Penny, who married Rowland Atkinson of Gressingham; and Maud Penny, who married William Dickenson, vicar of Elton, in Huntingdonshire, seven miles south-west of Peterborough, where Brian Penny owned a farm. Thomas Penny married Margaret Lucas, the daughter of John Lucas (d. 1556) of St John's in Colchester, Essex, formerly one of the Masters of Requests to Edward VI. She died in November 1587 and was buried in the same tomb as her father in St Peter's the Poor in London. On 4 June 1588, Thomas Penny made his will, naming his brother Brian as his executor. The will was duly proved on 23 January 1589; but Brian died in August 1590, and his duties were taken on by his daughter, Elizabeth Penny, who was living with her uncle Thomas when she married John Kettlewood in November 1586.

Penny was asthmatic and self-medicated with a concoction of crushed woodlice mixed with wine.
