= Jack Anthony =

Jack Anthony may refer to:

- Jack Anthony (hurler) (1886–1964), Kilkenny sportsperson
- Jack Anthony (jockey) (1890–1954), Welsh champion jockey
- Jack Anthony (musician) (born 1982), American singer-songwriter, composer and musician
- Jack Anthony (footballer) (born 1988), Australian rules football player in the Australian Football League
- Jack Anthony (wrestler) (born 1990), English professional wrestler

== See also ==
- John Anthony (disambiguation)
