= Francis Anthony =

16th-century British physician and chemist

Francis Anthony (16 April 1550 – 26 May 1623) was a 16th-century physician and chemist. His father, Derrick Anthony, was a goldsmith in London, employed in the jewel office of Queen Elizabeth. He attended the University of Cambridge, receiving a master of arts degree in 1574. He studied the theory and practice of chemistry, leaving Cambridge at the age of 40. In 1598, he sent abroad his first treatise concerning the excellency of a medicine drawn from gold.

== "Aurum Potabile" ==
He commenced a medical practice in London without a Licence from the college of Physicians, and after six months was called before the president of the college of Physicians. He was interdicted practice; for disregarding this injunction, he was fined five pounds and committed to prison, whence he was released by a warrant of the lord chief justice. The college however got him recommitted and Anthony submitted. Being again prosecuted for the same offence and refusing to pay a heavy fine, he was kept in prison eight months until released on petition of his wife on the grounds of poverty in 1602. But he continued to practise in defiance of the college and further proceedings were threatened but not carried out, probably because Anthony had powerful friends in court.

His practice consisted chiefly, if not entirely, in the prescription and sale of a secret remedy called "Aurum Potabile", which means "Drinkable Gold" in Latin, from which he derived a considerable fortune.

== Family ==
Francis married Susan Howe. He left a will dated 25 May 1623 and died 26 May 1623, leaving behind three sons and two daughters, including John and Charles. John became a Physician in London and Charles practiced at Bedford. Francis' oldest son, Francis, died shortly after his own father, with his will being dated 18 Aug 1623 and probated later that same year. According to the writer of the Biographia Britanica (1747 i 169) who professed to have derived his information from family manuscripts, Anthony was a man of high character and very generous to the poor.

== Death ==
He died in his seventy fourth year and was buried in the church of St. Bartholomew the Great, in the aisle that joins the north side of the chancel, where a Handsome monument has been erected to his memory with a very remarkable inscription:

"Sacred to the memory of the worthy and learned Francis Anthony, Dr. of Physic"
"There needs no verse to beautify thy praise,
Or keep in memory thy spotless name.
Religion, virtue and thy skill did rise
A three-fold pillar to thy lasting fame.
Though poisonous envy ever fought to blame
Or hide the fruits of thy intention,
Yet shall they commend that high design
Of purest gold to make a medicine,
That feel thy help by that, thy rare invention."

The career of Anthony and his conflict with the college of Physicians illustrated the condition of medical profession in the 17th century. He was obnoxious to the college not only because he kept the composition of his remedy a secret, and put it forward as a panacea for all diseases.

Anthony was a man of some learning and defended his panacea in several pamphlets, in which he quotes several Authors, chiefly chemists, as Raymond, Lully, and Arnold, de Villa, Nora. He refers to Paracelsus with an apology, but disclaims any special debt to him, and among other authorities, to Conrad Gessner who had written of "Aurum Potabile" in his writings. Anthony labors to show that metals are excellent medicines, gold, most of all; that by his method it was dissolved in potable form and furnished a universal medicine.

His adversaries denied the superiority of metals to other medicines and the special efficacy of gold, and that there was no such thing as a universal medicine, and that Anthony's method did not dissolve gold. Anthony desired to demonstrate his process to certain select witnesses and it appears that a trial actually took place at the college of physicians in 1609 in the presence of Thomas Lord Knyvet, master of the mint, and other skilled persons, when an ounce of gold was given to Anthony which by his method failed to dissolve.
