= Historia Plantarum =

Historia Plantarum (Latin: History of/Treatise on Plants) has been used as all or part of the name of several books, which include:

- Historia Plantarum (Theophrastus) (also called Enquiry into Plants), a book on plants by Theophrastus, written between c. 350 BC and c. 287 BC
- Historia Plantarum (Gessner) (also called Conradi Gesneri Historia Plantarum), a book on plants by Conrad Gessner, written between 1555 and 1565, published in 1750
- Historia Generalis Plantarum (Daléchamps), 1586
- Historia Plantarum Universalis Oxoniensis, unfinished work by Robert Morison, first volume published in 1680, second volume completed by Jacob Bobart the Younger and published in 1699
- Historia Plantarum (Ray), a book by John Ray, published in 1686
- Historia Plantarum Rariorum (A History of Rare Plants), a book by John Martyn, published in 1728–1737
- Historia Plantarum in Palatinatu Electorali, a book by Johan Adam Pollich, published in 1776–1777
- Nomenclator ex Historia Plantarum Indigenarum Helvetiae Excerptus Auctore by Albrecht von Haller, an index (nomenclator) to his book Historia Stirpium Indigenarum Helvetiae Inchoata, published in 1768
