= Carolinum, Zurich =

Educational institution in Zurich, Switzerland

Carolinum
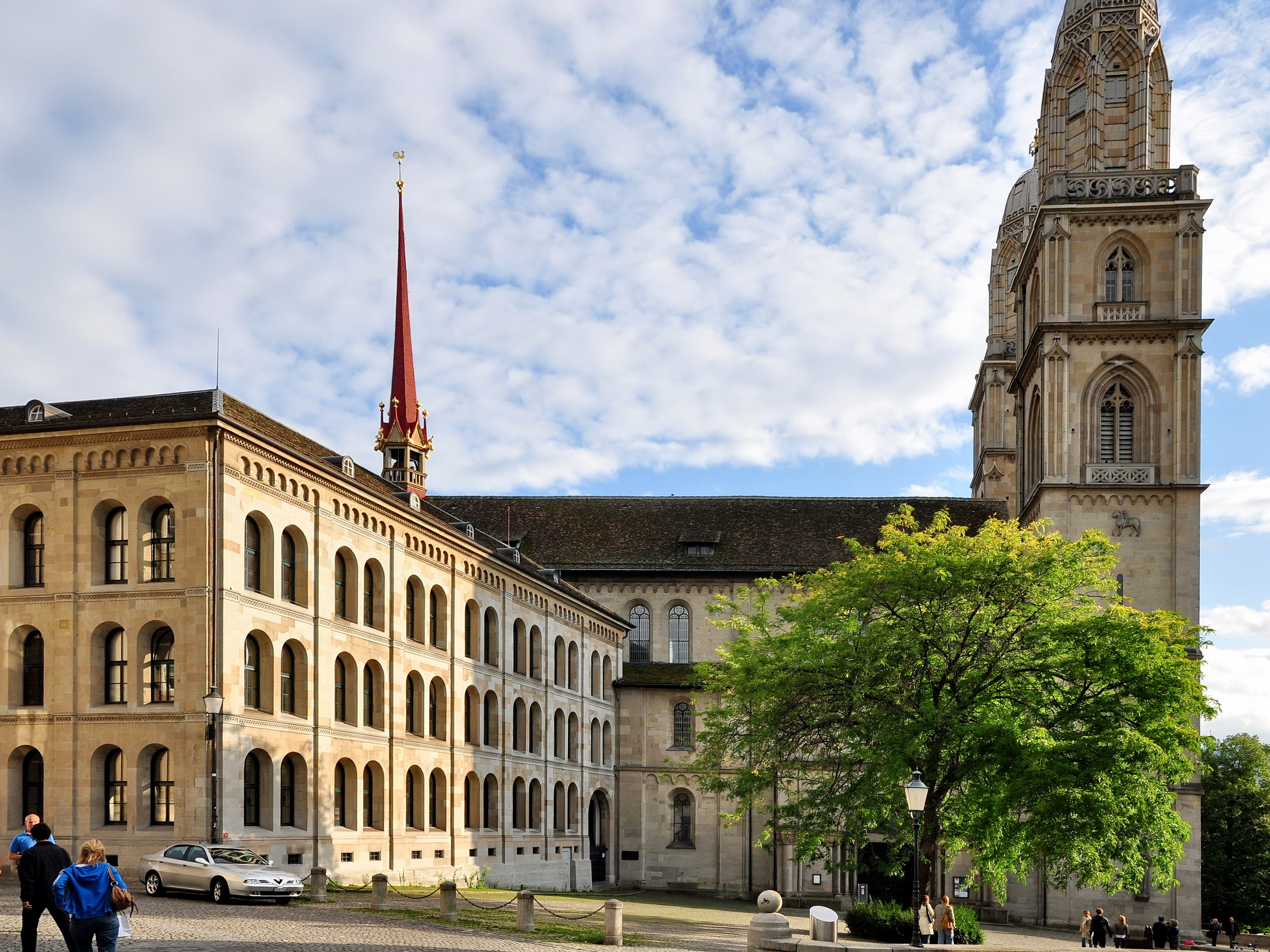
- Carolinum and Grossmünster as seen from Grossmünsterplatz (Zwingliplatz) in Zurich
- Former names: Prophezey; Schola Tigurina; Töchterschule; Ehemalige Mädchenschule am Grossmünster
- Alternative names: Theologisches Seminar

General information
- Architectural style: Romanesque Revival
- Location: Zurich, Switzerland, Kirchgasse 9, 8001 Zurich
- Coordinates: 47°22′12″N 8°32′39.12″E
- Construction started: 1843
- Completed: 1849
- Owner: City of Zurich

Technical details
- Floor count: 3

Design and construction
- Architect: Gustav Albert Wegmann

The Carolinum (sometimes Prophezei or Prophezey) is the predecessor educational institution of the theological faculty of the University of Zurich, established in 1525. As building, it is part of the former cloister of the Grossmünster Chorherrenstift in Zurich, Switzerland. Grossmünster and Carolinum (Ehemalige Mädchenschule am Grossmünster) are listed in the Swiss inventory of cultural property of national and regional significance as a Class A object.

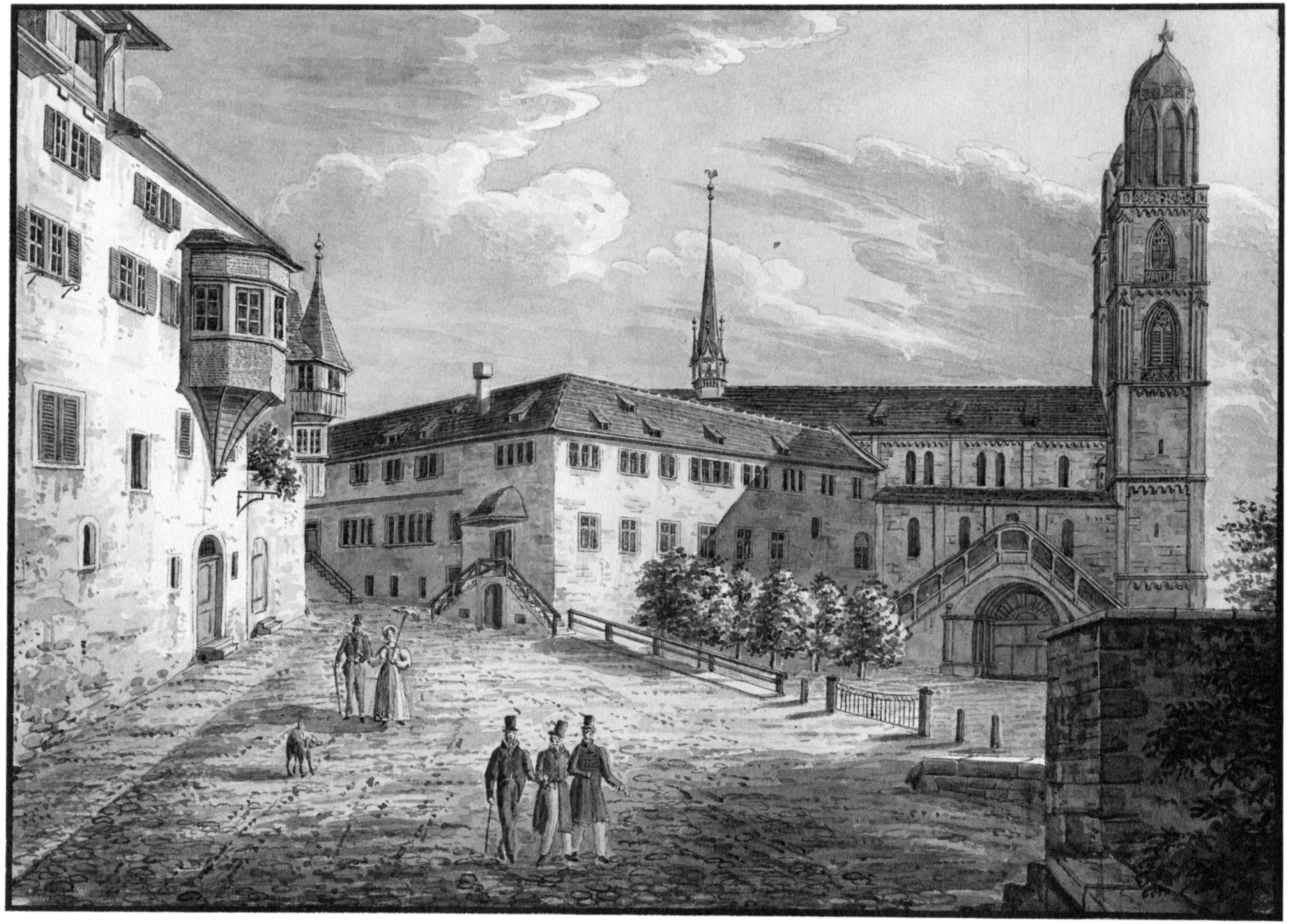
Carolinum and Grossmünster on a drawing by Emil Schulhess in 1835

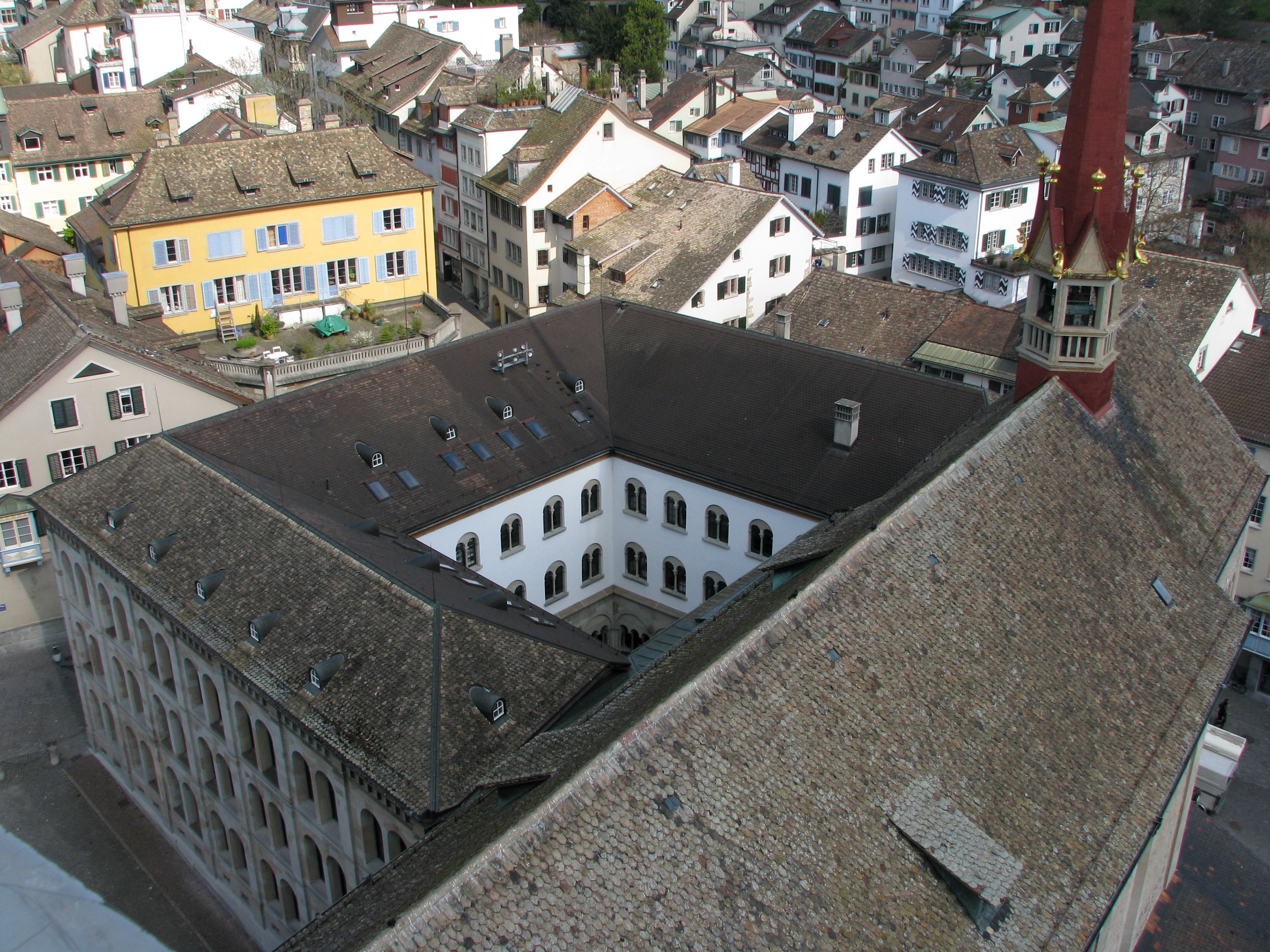
the former cloister area as seen from Grossmünster's Karlsturm church tower

== History ==
An institutionalized academic education in Zürich dates back to the medieval collegiate and city schools. In the late European Middle Ages, a Carolinum associated to the Grossmünster priory and its canons was mentioned. On occasion of the Reformation in Zürich, it even became an important rule for the training of prospective Protestant theologians. As other educational institutions, it is named after Charlemagne (Carol or Swiss-German Karl).

The reformer Huldrych Zwingli initiated the transformation of the former Latin school Prophezey or Prophezei into a training center for reformed theologians, by a Zürich city's council mandate on 29 September 1523 AD; lessons started on 19 June 1525. The weekday lectures (Lezgen or Lectiones, literally: lessons) were free of charge for the interested people in urban and rural areas of the city republic of Zürich, by well-learned men. Heinrich Bullinger's Schola Tigurina may have influenced the education in many other institutions beginning in 1559. Bullinger's Schola Tigurina merged in the 18th century to the theological faculty and the upper secondary school in the then Carolinum been. The financing of the chairs respectively professorships was depending on the benefices of the secularized canons of the former Grossmünster priory. In addition to theological subjects and Classical languages, in 1541, the natural history department (Conrad Gessner) and in 1731 a political science chair (Johann Jakob Bodmer) was created, and in 1782 the surgical institute to train medical doctors.

After the abolition of the Chorherrenstift congregation in 1832, the building was sold to the Canton of Zürich. In 1849 the structures were widely demolished and replaced by Gustav Albert Wegmann's building. The Grossmünsterplatz schoolhouse of the girls' gymnasium (Töchterschule, as of today Kantonsschule Hohe Promenade), an urban high school for girls, was established in 1875 and located in the building until 1976, when the Theological faculty of the University of Zürich moved in.

The present University of Zürich bases on the Carolinum and uses its former logo, the silhouette of the Grossmünster church. The university claims to be established in the tradition of the canons of the Carolinum's institutions.

== Notable personalities ==
- Theodor Bibliander, faculty
- Johann Jakob Bodmer, faculty
- Heinrich Bullinger, faculty
- Conrad Gessner, faculty
- Konrad Pellikan, faculty
- Josias Simmler, faculty
- Peter Martyr Vermigli, faculty

== Architecture ==
The building is located at Kirchgasse 9 at the Grossmünsterplatz square – attached to the Grossmünster church on its eastern side – in the southeast of the Neumarkt respectively northwestern of the Münsterhof squares in Zürich.

=== Cloister and Carolinum ===
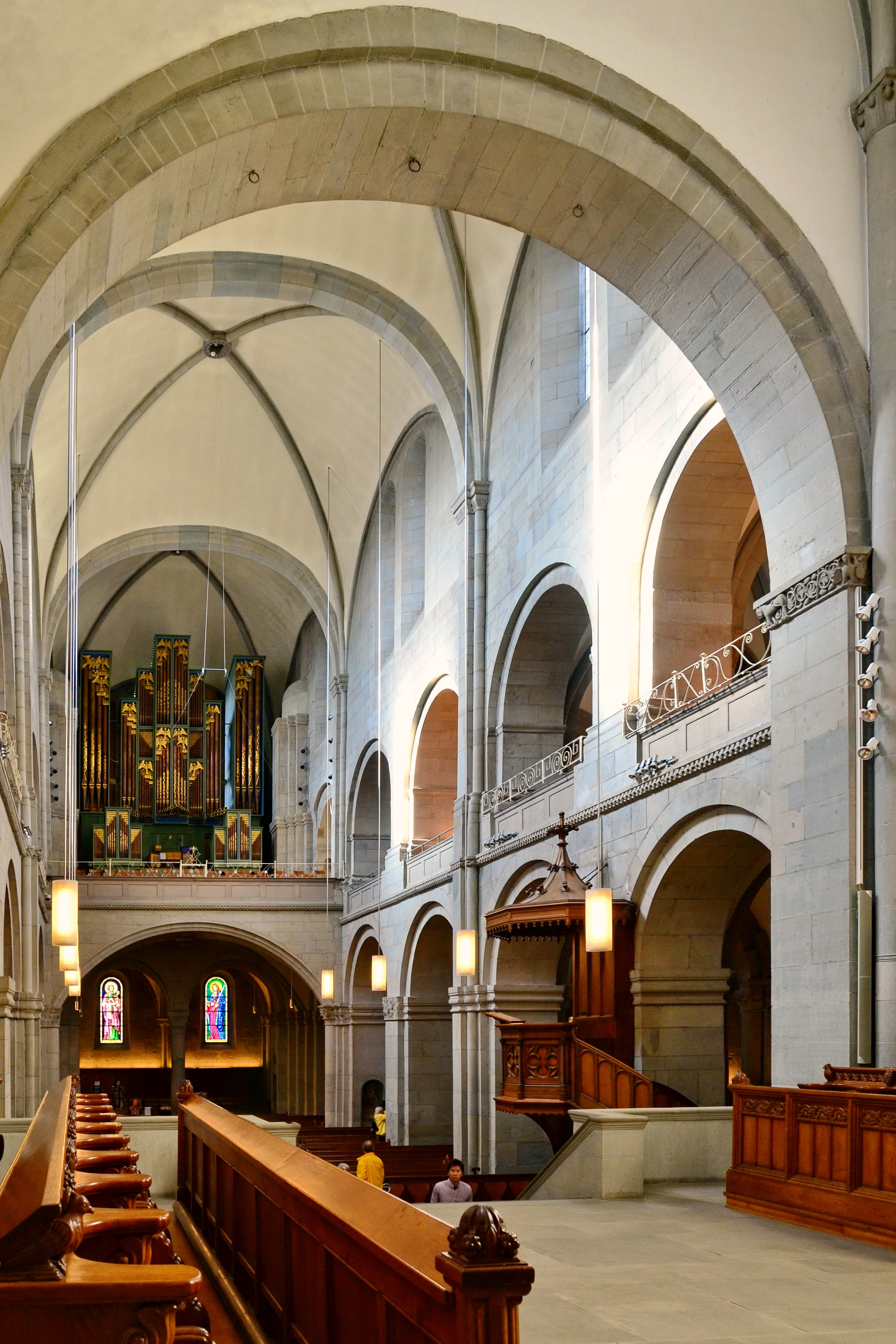
Interior view of the church

The cloister of the former Chorherrenstift Grossmünster, the chapter of Augustinian canons, dates from the late 12th century and was part of the canons (Chorherrenstift) which was dissolved in 1832, making way for the girls' school. The cloister was dismantled and integrated into the new building those reconstruction was based on the original elements of the architecture, but includes numerous interpretations by the architect. The cloister is also home to a permanent exhibition on Zwingli and other important people in the Reformation era.

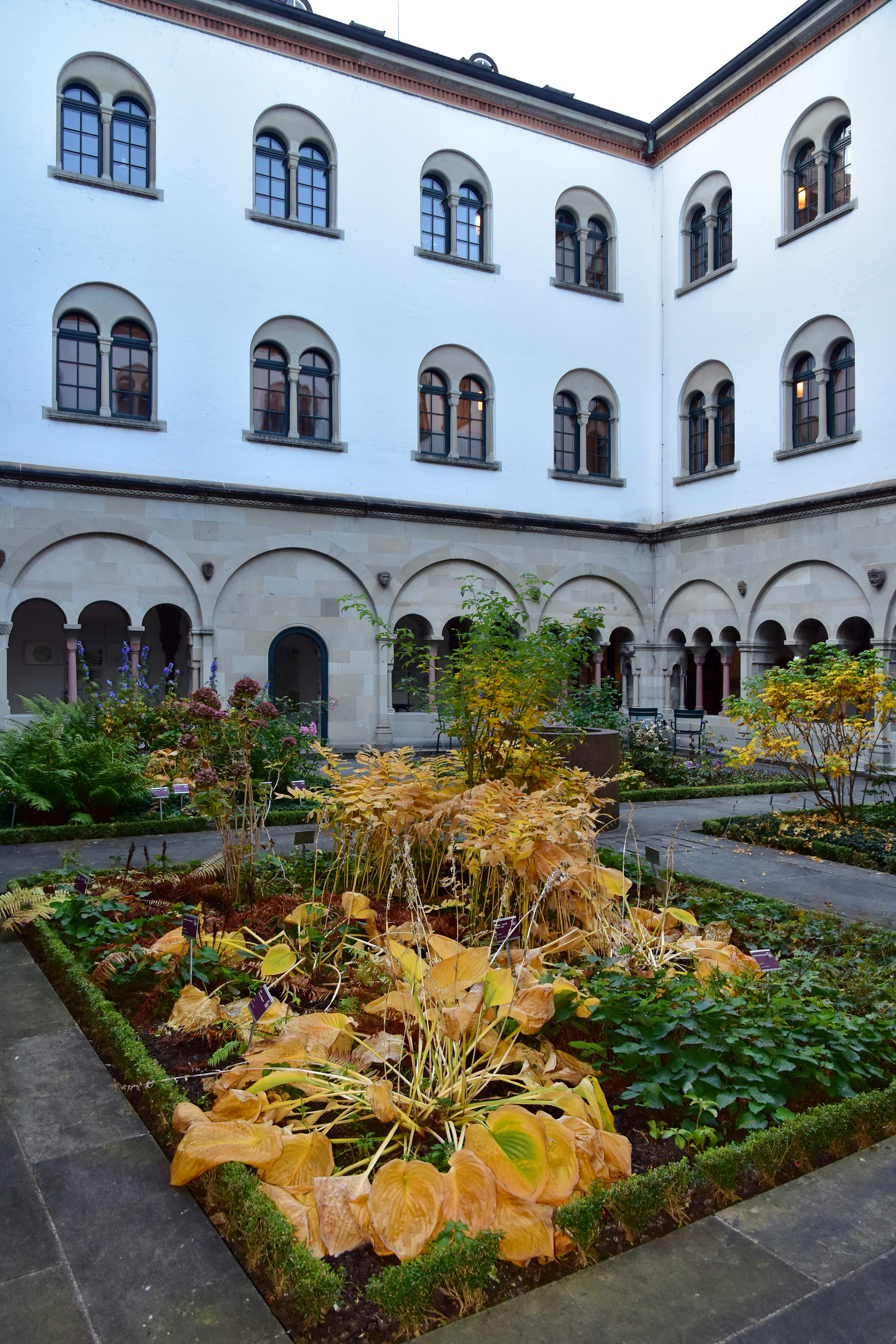
Herbal garden

The cloister was renewed in 2009, its sandstone elements were cleaned, and the interior garden redesigned in corporation with the ProSpecieRara foundation. The compilation of the cultural and historical ornamental plants is inspired by the natural scientist and polymath Conrad Gessner who found his final resting place in the cloister. Gessner dealt inter alia with the elements of teaching, therefore the renewed courtyard garden is dedicated to the thema earth, fire, water and air, cultural-historical ornamental plants in the four beds, analogous to the Gessner-Garten in the Old Botananical Garden.

=== Present status ===
After the abolition of the Chorherrenstift congregation in 1832, and to 1849 the structures were widely demolished and replaced by Wegmann's building in the Romanesque Revival style. The as of today faculty building was built according to the drafts Gustav Albert Wegmann from 1843 to 1849. The cloister was dismantled during the demolition, supplemented with many new parts and integrated into the new building in 1851. The Grossmünster church building is owned by the canton of Zürich, and the annex building being the former cloister, however, is in the property of the city of Zürich. It is leased to the Theological faculty of the University of Zürich since 1976.

== Cultural heritage ==
Grossmünster and Carolinum (Ehemalige Mädchenschule am Grossmünster) are listed in the Swiss inventory of cultural property of national and regional significance as a Class A object of national importance.

== Literature ==
- Daniel Gutscher: Das Grossmünster in Zürich. Eine baugeschichtliche Monographie. Beiträge zur Kunstgeschichte der Schweiz, Volume 5. Redaction by Catherine Courtiau, Stefan Biffiger, Gian-Willi Vonesch. Gesellschaft für Schweizerische Kunstgeschichte Stäfa, Bern 1983, ISBN 3-85717-017-4.
