= Bibliotheca universalis =

1545–1549 listing of all known books

Bibliotheca universalis (1545–1549) was the first truly comprehensive "universal" listing of all the books of the first century of printing. It was an alphabetical bibliography that listed all the known books printed in Latin, Greek, or Hebrew. It listed 10,000 titles by 1,800 authors.

== Bibliotheca (1545) ==
The Swiss scholar Conrad Gessner started to compile his extensive work on Bibliotheca universalis at the age of 25. He first visited as many of the Italian and German libraries as he could find. His motivation was partly a fear of the loss of precious manuscripts, such as the destruction of the library at Buda, by the Turks in 1526. He described the project in its title, as involving works "extant and not, ancient and more recent down to the present day, learned and not, published and hiding in libraries". He published the completed work in 1545 in Zurich, after some four years of research. At the time, he wrote "In truth I rejoice and thank God because I have finally gotten out of the labyrinth in which I was trapped for almost three years". It included his own bio-bibliography. Bibliotheca universalis was the first modern bibliography of importance published since the invention of printing, and through it, Gessner became known as the "father of bibliography."

The work attempted to be an exhaustive survey of known writing in Latin, Greek, and Hebrew, and included approximately three thousand authors The authors’ forenames were listed alphabetically according to mediaeval usage, with a reverse index of their surnames. It was intended as an index by subject of all known authors. Gessner listed the writers together with the titles of their works, short biographies, and publication details including place of printing, printers and editors. He added his own annotations, comments, and evaluations of the nature and merit of every entry. It included about twelve thousand titles.

Gessner followed Johannes Trithemius’s work of placing works in systems of cataloging. Gessner admired Trithemius’s systems and used them as guidelines and templates; however Gessner carried the idea of cataloging and systems a step further. Theodore Besterman, in The Beginnings of Systematic Bibliography, suggests that Gessner’s work to organize knowledge was the forerunner of Francis Bacon’s works and other encyclopedias that followed. Though called "universal", it was intended to be selective.

== Pandectae (1548) ==
In 1548, Gessner followed this with a companion thematic index to Bibliotheca universalis, a large folio, Pandectarum sive Partitionum universalium Conradi Gesneri Tigurini, medici & philosophiae professoris, libri xxi (Pandectae). (Note: From Pandectae, a compendium) This contained thirty thousand topical entries. Each of these entries were cross-referenced to the appropriate author and book, arranged under headings and sub-headings, which were associated with various branches of learning.

The Pandectae had nineteen sections, each devoted to a scholarly discipline and contained dedications to the best scholar printers of Gessner's time. He listed their publications and accomplishments. The planned scope of 21 books was never completed, since part 20 De re medica was never published, and part 21 De theologia Christiana was published separately as Partitiones theologicae in 1549. A further supplement Appendix bibliothecae containing additions previously published separately by Lycosthenes (1551) and Simmler (1555) appeared in 1555.

Gessner made full use of any publishers' catalogues and booksellers' lists which were available in the 16th century that were printed when he was doing his research. These included use of printed catalogues supplied by firms like Aldus Manutius of Venice and Henri Estienne of Paris.

== Bibliotheca selecta (1593) ==
Gesner’s work, reflecting Protestant scholarship and principles, was soon placed on the Index librorum prohibitorum. In response, Catholic scholarship during the Counter-Reformation produced a major updated work in Rome under the programmatic title Bibliotheca selecta. This work was organized into eighteen books covering the bibliography of the traditional scientific disciplines (Theology, 1-11, Law, 12, Philosophy, 13, Medicine, 14) and the liberal arts, 15–18). It was compiled by the Mantuan Jesuit humanist and bibliographer Antonio Possevino.

== Bibliography ==
- Blair, Ann M. (2010). Too Much to Know: Managing Scholarly Information before the Modern Age. Yale University Press. ISBN 978-0-300-16849-5.
- Eisenstein, Elizabeth L. (1980). The Printing Press as an Agent of Change. Cambridge University Press. ISBN 978-0-521-29955-8.
- Gessner, Conrad (1545). Bibliotheca Universalis, sive Catalogus omnium Scriptoum locupletissimus, in tribus linguis, Latina, Græca, & Hebraica; extantium & non extantium, veterum et recentiorum in hunc usque diem ... publicatorum et in Bibliothecis latentium, etc. Zurich: Christophorum Froschouerum.
- Gessner, Conrad (1548). Pandectarum sive Partitionum ... libri XXI. Zurich: Christophorus Froschoverus.
- Balsamo, Luigi (1976). "Bibliografia e censura ecclesiastica. A proposito dell'esemplare Linceo della «Bibliotheca universalis» di Konrad Gesner". Gutenberg-Jahrbuch. Bd. 51 (1976): 298–305.
- Grout, James. "Conrad Gessner". Encyclopaedia Romana. University of Chicago.
- Moreni, Alberto (1986). "La Bibliotheca Universalis di Konrad Gesner e gli Indici dei libri proibiti". La Bibliofilía, vol. 88, no. 2 (1986): 131–50.
- Norman, Jeremy (21 May 2014). "Conrad Gessner Issues the First Universal Bibliography Since the Invention of Printing (1545 – 1555)". History of Information.
- Pettitt, George A. (18 February 2014). "Conrad Gesner". Encyclopædia Britannica.
- Raven, J. (2004). Lost Libraries: The Destruction of Great Book Collections Since Antiquity. Palgrave Macmillan UK. ISBN 978-0-230-52425-5.
- Anzovin, Steven; Podell, Janet (2000). Famous First Facts, International Edition: A Record of First Happenings, Discoveries, and Inventions in World History. H. W. Wilson Company. ISBN 978-0-8242-0958-2.
- Wellisch, Hans (Hanan) (June 1975). "Conrad Gessner: a bio-bibliography". Journal of the Society for the Bibliography of Natural History. 7 (2): 151–247. doi:10.3366/jsbnh.1975.7.2.151.
