= Conrad Gessner =

Swiss physician, bibliographer and naturalist (1516–1565)

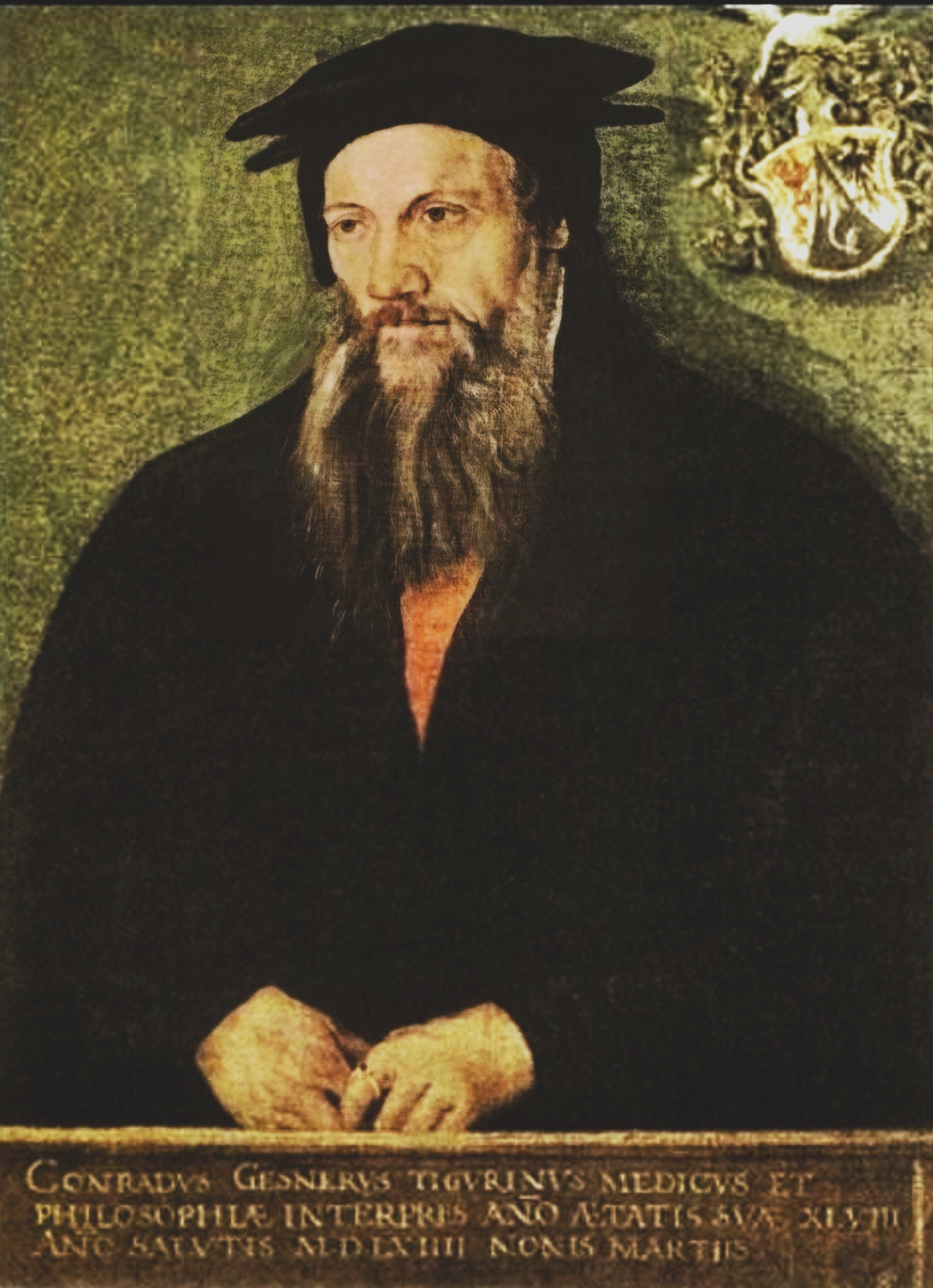
- Portrait by Tobias Stimmer, c. 1564
- Born: 26 March 1516; Zurich, Swiss Confederacy
- Died: 13 December 1565 (aged 49); Zurich, Swiss Confederacy
- Resting place: Grossmünster, Zurich
- Education: University of Basel, University of Montpellier
- Known for: Bibliotheca universalis and Historia animalium
- Scientific career
- Fields: Botany, zoology and bibliography
- Author abbrev. (botany): Gesner

Conrad Gessner (/ˈɡɛsnər/; Latin: Conradus Gesnerus; (Note: The name has a number of spellings, including Konrad Gessner, Konrad Gesner, Conradi Gesneri, Conrad Geßner, Conrad Gesner, Conrad von Gesner, Cuonrat and Cunrat. The single-"s" Gesner derives incorrectly from the Latin form Conradus Gesnerus.) 26 March 1516 – 13 December 1565) was a Swiss physician, naturalist, bibliographer, and philologist. Born into a poor family in Zurich, Switzerland, his father and teachers quickly realised his talents and supported him through university, where he studied classical languages, theology and medicine. He became Zurich's city physician, but was able to spend much of his time on collecting, research and writing. Gessner compiled monumental works on bibliography (Bibliotheca universalis 1545–1549) and zoology (Historia animalium 1551–1558) and was working on a major botanical text at the time of his death from plague at the age of 49. He is regarded as the father of modern scientific bibliography, zoology and botany. He was frequently the first to describe species of plants or animals in Europe, such as the tulip in 1559. A number of plants and animals have been named after him.

== Life ==
Conrad Gessner was born on 26 March 1516, in Zurich, Switzerland, the son of Ursus Gessner, a poor Zurich furrier. His early life was one of poverty and hardship, but Gessner's father realized his talents, and sent him to live with and be schooled by a great uncle, who grew and collected medicinal herbs for a living. Here the boy became familiar with many plants and their medicinal purposes which led to a lifelong interest in natural history.

Gessner first attended the Carolinum in Zurich, then later entered the Fraumünster seminary. There he studied classical languages, appearing as Penia (Poverty) in Aristophanes' Plutus, at the age of 15. In school, he impressed his teachers so much that a few of them helped sponsor him so that he could further his education, including arranging a scholarship for him to attend university in France to study theology (1532–1533) at the age of 17. There he attended the University of Bourges and University of Paris. Religious persecution forced him to leave Paris for Strasbourg, but being unable to secure employment, he returned to Zurich. One of his teachers in Zurich acted as a foster father to him after the death of his father at the Battle of Kappel (1531), another provided him with three years of board and lodging, while yet another arranged his further education at the upper school in Strasbourg, the Strasbourg Academy. There he broadened his knowledge of ancient languages by studying Hebrew. In 1535, religious unrest drove him back to Zurich, where he made what some considered an imprudent marriage at the age of 19, of a woman from another poor family who had no dowry. Although some of his friends again came to his aid, he was appointed to obtaining a teaching position for him, this was in the lowest class and attracted a stipend barely more than a pittance. However, he then obtained a paid leave of absence to study medicine at the University of Basel (1536).

Throughout his life Gessner was interested in natural history, and collected specimens and descriptions of wildlife through travel and extensive correspondence with other friends and scholars. In 1543 Arnoldus Arlenius invited Gessner to Venice. Gessner travelled to Italy that same summer. He encountered Venetian printing and a hidden world of Greek manuscripts.

Gessner's approach to research consisted of four main components: observation, dissection, travel to distant lands, and accurate description. This rising observational approach was new to Renaissance scholars because people usually relied completely upon Classical writers for their research. He died of the plague, the year after his ennoblement on 13 December 1565.

== Work ==
Conrad Gessner was a Renaissance polymath, a physician, philosopher, encyclopaedist, bibliographer, philologist, natural historian and illustrator. In 1537, at the age of 21, his publication of a Graecolatin dictionary led his sponsors to obtain for him the professorship of Greek at the newly founded academy of Lausanne (then belonging to Bern). Here he had leisure to devote himself to scientific studies, especially botany, and earn money to further his medical studies.

After three years of teaching at Lausanne, Gessner was able to travel to the medical school at the University of Montpellier, where he received his doctoral degree (1541) from Basel. He then returned to Zurich to practice medicine, which he continued to do for the rest of his life. There he was also appointed to the post of lecturer of Aristotelian physics at the Carolinum, the precursor of the University of Zurich.

After 1554 he became the city physician (Stadtarzt). In addition to his duties there, and apart from a few journeys to foreign countries, and annual summer botanical journeys in his native land, and illnesses, he was able to devote himself to research and writing. His expeditions frequently involved visits to mountainous country, below the snow-line. Although primarily for purposes of botanical collection, he also extolled mountain climbing for the sake of exercise and enjoyment of the beauties of nature. In 1541 he prefixed to his treatise on milk and milk products, Libellus de lacte et operibus lactariis a letter addressed to his friend Jacob Avienus (Vogel) (Note: Provincial governor and a leader of Swiss protestants) of Glarus on the wonders to be found among the mountains, declaring his love for them, and his firm resolve to climb at least one mountain every year, not only to collect flowers, but in order to exercise his body. In 1555 he issued his narrative Descriptio Montis Fracti sive Montis Pilati of his excursion to the Gnepfstein (1920 m), the lowest point in the Pilatus chain.

Gessner is credited with a number of the first descriptions of species in Europe, both animals such as the brown rat (Rattus norvegicus), guinea pig (Cavia porcellus) and turkey (Meleagris), as well as plants such as the tulip (Tulipa gesneriana). He first saw a tulip in April 1559, growing in the garden of the magistrate Johann Heinrich Herwart at Augsburg, and called it Tulipa turcarum, the Turkish tulip. He is also credited with being the first person to describe brown adipose tissue, in 1551, in 1565 the first to document the pencil, and in 1563 among the first Europeans to write about the effects of tobacco.

=== Publications ===
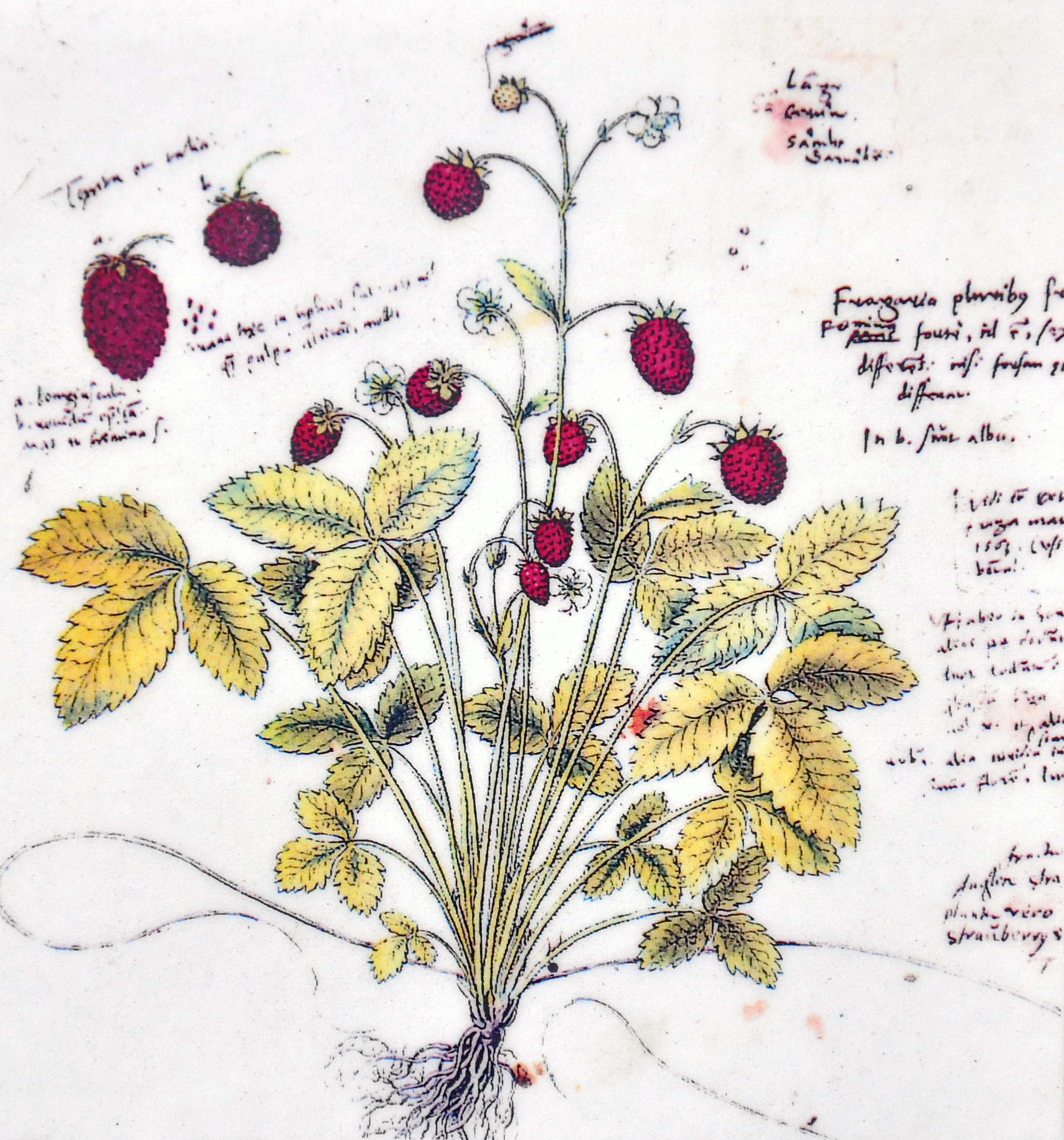
Fragaria vesca (wild strawberry), from Gessner's Historia plantarum

Gessner's first work was a Latin-Greek Dictionary, the Lexicon Graeco-Latinum (1537), compiled during his studies in Basel. This was a revision of an original work by the Italian cleric, Varinus Phavorinus or Guarino of Favera (d. 1537), Magnum ac perutile dictionarium (1523). Over his lifetime he was able to produce some 70 publications on many different subjects.

His next major work was his unique Bibliotheca (1545), a landmark in the history of bibliography, in which he set out to catalogue all the writers who had ever lived and their works. In addition to his monumental work on animal life, the Historiae animalium (1551–1558), he amassed a very large collection of notes and wood engravings of plants, but only published two botanical works in his lifetime, Historia plantarum et vires (1541) and the Catalogus plantarum (1542) in four languages. It was in the last decade of his life that he began to compile his major botanical work, Historia plantarum. Although he died prior to its completion, his work was utilised by many other authors over the next two centuries, but was finally published in 1754.

Not content with scientific works, Gessner was also active as a linguist and bibliographer, putting forth in 1555 his book entitled Mithridates. De differentiis linguarum [...], an account of about 130 known languages, with the Lord's Prayer in twenty-two languages. He also produced edited works of a number of classical authors (see Edited works), including Claudius Aelianus (1556) and Marcus Aurelius (1559).

A number of other works appeared after his death (posthumously), some long after (see Posthumous works). His work on insects was edited by various authors, including Thomas Penny, until Thomas Muffet brought it to publication as Insectorum sive minimorum animalium theatrum (1634), finally appearing in English translation as The Theatre of Insects in Edward Topsell's History of Four-Footed Beasts and Serpents (1658).

==== Bibliotheca universalis (1545–1549) ====
In 1545, after four years of research, Gessner published his remarkable Bibliotheca universalis, an exhaustive catalogue of all known works in Latin, Greek and Hebrew, of all writers who had ever lived, with the titles of their works, and brief annotations. The work, which included his own bio-bibliography, listed some three thousand authors alphabetically, and was the first modern bibliography published since the invention of printing. Through it, Gessner became known as the "father of bibliography." In all, about twelve thousand titles were included.

A second part, a thematic index to the work, Pandectarum sive partitionum universalium libri xxi, appeared in 1548. Although the title indicated that twenty one parts were intended, only nineteen books were included. Part 20, intended to include his medical work, was never finished and part 21, a theological encyclopaedia, was published separately in 1549.

==== Historia animalium (1551–1558) ====
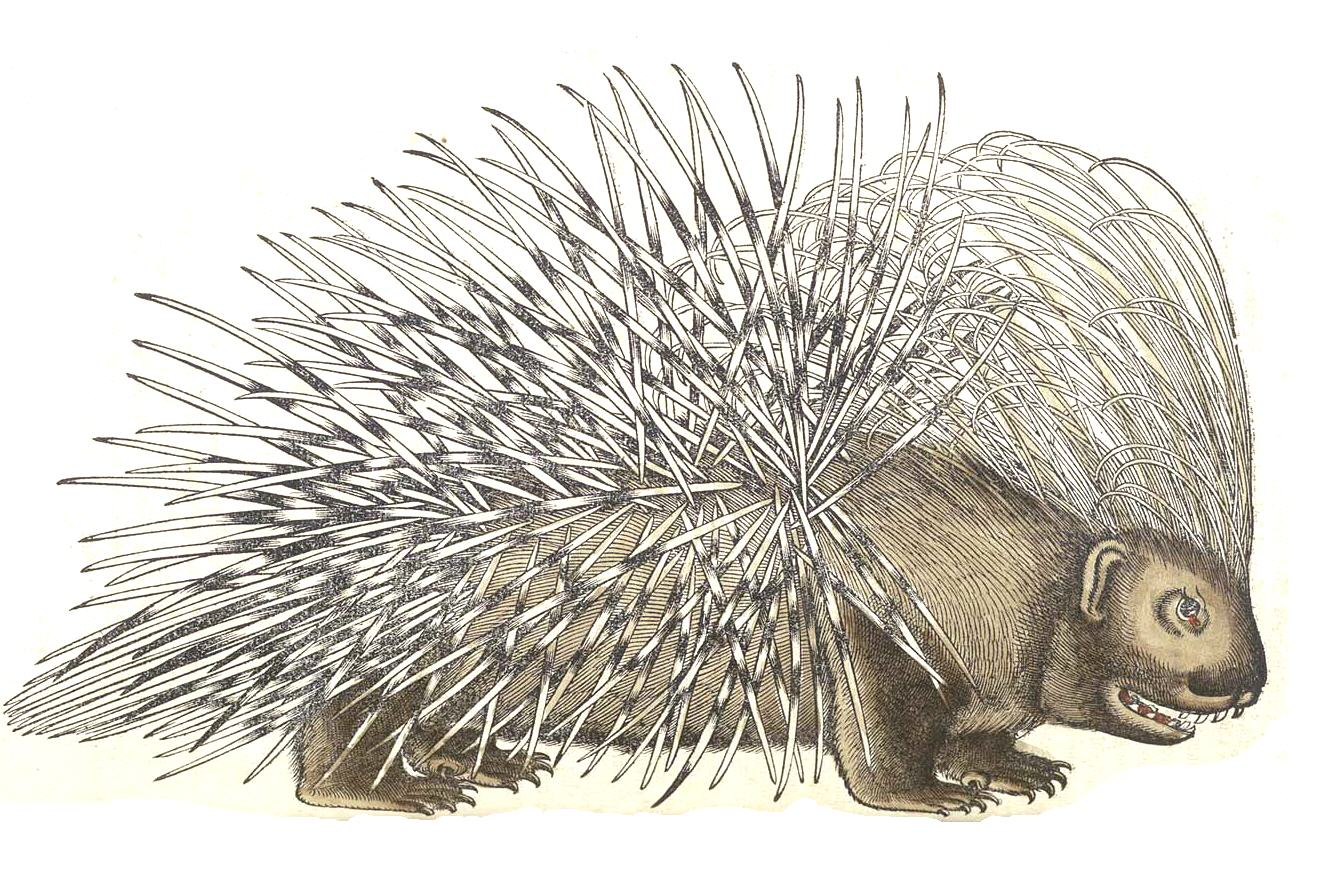
Porcupine, Historiae animalium, 1551

Gessner's great zoological work, Historia animalium, is a 4,500-page encyclopedia of animals that appeared in Zurich in 4 volumes between 1551 and 1558: quadrupeds, amphibians, birds, and fishes. A fifth folio on snakes was issued in 1587. A German translation of the first 4 volumes titled Thierbůch was published in Zurich in 1563. This book was considered to be the first modern zoological work. It built a bridge between ancient, medieval and modern science.

In Historia animalium Gessner combines data from old sources, such as the Old Testament, Aristotle, Pliny, folklore, and medieval bestiaries, adding his own observations. He created a new, comprehensive description of the Animal Kingdom. This was the first attempt by anyone to describe many animals accurately. The book unlike many works of its time was illustrated with hand-colored woodcuts drawn from personal observations by Gessner and his colleagues.

Even though he sought to distinguish observed facts from myths and popular errors and was known for his accurate depiction of many animals in Historia animalium, he also included many fictional animals such as the Unicorn and the Basilisk, which he had only heard about from medieval bestiaries. But when Gessner doubted the accuracy of the opinions he relayed in his own writings, or the validity of the illustrations he included, he clearly said so. Besides any plant or animal's potential advantage to people, Gessner was interested in learning about them because of the moral lessons they could teach and the divine truths they might tell. He went into as much detail about some unreal animals as he did about real ones. Later in 1556 he also combined real and fictional creatures in his edition of the works of Claudius Aelianus.

Historia animalium includes sketches for many well-known animals, and some fictional ones, including unicorns and mermaids. He accomplished many of his works in a large part due to the web of acquaintances he established with leading naturalists throughout Europe, who included John Caius, English court physician to the Tudors and second founder of Gonville and Caius College, Cambridge. Not only did they send him their ideas, but also sent him plants, animals and gems. He returned the favor – and kept helpful specimens coming – by naming plants after correspondents and friends.

==== Historia plantarum (unfinished) ====
Over his lifetime, Gessner amassed a considerable collection of plants and seeds and made extensive notes and wood engravings. In the last decade of his life he began to compile his major botanical work, Historia plantarum. although he died prior to its publication his materials were utilised by many subsequent authors for the next two hundred years. These included some 1,500 engravings of plants and their important flowers and seeds, most of which were original. The scale and scientific rigour of these were unusual for the time, and Gessner was a skilled artist, producing detailed drawings of specific plant parts that illustrated their characteristics, with extensive marginal notation discussing their growth form and habitation. Finally, the work was published in 1754.

==== Censorship ====
There was extreme religious tension at the time that Historia animalium came out. Under Pope Paul IV the Pauline Index felt that the religious convictions of an author contaminated all his writings. Since Gessner was a Protestant his works were included in this index of prohibited books. Even though religious tensions were high, Gessner maintained friendships on both sides of the Catholic-Protestant divide. In fact, Catholic booksellers in Venice protested the Inquisition's blanket ban on Gessner's books, and some of his work was eventually allowed after it had been "cleaned" of its doctrinal errors.

==== List of selected publications ====
see Wellisch (1975), BHL (2017)

- Gessner, Conrad (1541) [1537]. Lexicon Graeco-Latinum, ex Phavorini Camertis Lexico. Basel: Walder. (Note: Lexicon Graeco-Latinum: Commissioned by Basel printer Johannes Walder (d. 1542), who omitted Gessner's name. Reprinted 1541, followed by several later editions and revisions)
- — (1541a). Libellus de lacte et operibus lactariis. (Note: Libellus de lacte: For prefatory letter to Jacob Avienus in translation, On the admiration of mountains, see Works in translation)
- — (1541b). Historiae plantarum et vires. (Note: Historiae plantarum et vires: An index of plant names from texts on medical topics, by authors from Dioscorides to Pliny the Elder)
- — (1542). Catalogus plantarum Latinè, Graecè, Germanicè, & Gallicè. Zurich: Apud Christoph. Froschoverum. (Note: Catalogus plantarum: Alphabetical catalogue of plant names in four languages)
- — (1545). Bibliotheca Universalis, sive Catalogus omnium Scriptoum locupletissimus, in tribus linguis, Latina, Græca, & Hebraica; extantium & non-extantium, veterum et recentiorum in hunc usque diem ... publicatorum et in Bibliothecis latentium, etc. Zurich: Christophorum Froschouerum., see also Bibliotheca universalis
- — (1548). Pandectarum sive Partitionum ... libri XXI. Zurich: Christophorus Froschoverus., see also Bibliotheca universalis
  - — (1549). Partitiones theologicae.
  - — (1555). Appendix bibliothecae.
- — (1551–1558). Historiae animalium.
  - 1551 Quadrupedes vivipares
  - 1554 Quadrupedes ovipares
  - 1555 Avium natura
  - 1558 Piscium & aquatilium animantium natura
- — (1552). Thesaurus Euonymi Philiatri.
- — (1553). Corpus Venetum de Balneis.
- — (1555). Descriptio Montis Fracti sive Montis Pilati ut vulgo nominant iuxta Lucernam in Helvetia per Conradum Gesnerum. (Note: Descriptio Montis Fracti sive Montis Pilati: For English translation A Description of the Riven Mountain, Commonly Called Mount Pilatus, see Works in translation)
- — (1555a). Mithridates. De differentiis linguarum [...]. Froschoverus.
- — (1561). In hoc volumine continentur ....De hortus Germaniae. Argentorati: Iosias Rihelius.
- Geßner, Cůnrat; Forer, Cůnrat (1563). Thierbůch Das ist ein kurtze bschreybung aller vierfüssigen Thieren [...]

Posthumous works

- Schatz Euonymi, 1582/1583
  - Der erste Theil, deß köstlichen unnd theuren Schatzes Euonymi Philiatri [...] Erstlich in Latein beschrieben durch Euonymum Philiatrum, und neuwlich verteutscht durch Joannem Rudolphum Landenberger zu Zürych, 1582 Band 1
  - Ander Theil des Schatzs Euonymi [...] Erstlich zusammen getragen, durch Herren Doctor Cunrat Geßner, Demnach von Caspar Wolffen der Artzneyen Doctor in Zürich in Latin beschriben und in Truck gefertiget, jetzund aber newlich von Johan. Jacobo Nüscheler Doctorn, in Teütsche Sprach vertolmetschet., 1583 Band 2 Band 2
- Gäßner, Cůnradt; Forer, Cůnradt (1575). Fischbůch Das ist ein kurtze, doch vollkommne beschreybung aller Fischen [...].
- Geßner, Cůnrat; Forer, Cůnrat (1583). Thierbůch Das ist ein kurtze beschreybung aller vier füssigen Thieren [...].
- Geßner, Conrat; Carronus, Jacobus (1589). Schlangenbůch. Das ist ein grundtliche und vollkommne Beschreybung aller Schlagen [...]
- Geßner, Conrad; Heußlich, Rudolff (1600). Vogelbuch oder ausführliche beschreibung und lebendige ja auch eygentliche Controfactur und Abmahlung aller und jeder Vögel [...].
- Wotton, Edward; Gesner, Conrad; Penny, Thomas (1634). Muffet, Thomas (ed.). Insectorvm Sive Minimorum Animalivm Theatrvm. London: Cotes.
- Gessner, Conrad (1754) [1555–1565]. Schmidel, Casimir Christoph; Trew, Christoph Jacob (eds.). Conradi Gesneri philosophi et medici celeberrimi Opera botanica, per duo saecula desiderata, vitam avctoris et operis historiam Cordi librvm qvintvm cvm adnotationibvs Gesneri in totvm opvs vt et Wolphii fragmentvm historiae plantarvm Gesnerianae adivnctis, indicibvs iconvm tam olim editarvm qvam nvnc prodevntivm cvm figvris vltra CCCC. minoris formae, partim ligno excisis partim aeri inscvlptis complectentia, qvae ex bibliotheca D. Christophori Iacobi Trew ... nvnc primvm in lvcem edidit et praefatvs est D. Casimirvs Christophorvs Schmiedel. Nuremberg: Impensis Io. Mich. Seligmanni, typis Io. Iosephi Fleischmanni.

Edited works

- Aelianus, Claudius (1565) [1556 Claudii Aeliani praenestini pontificis et sophistae]. Gessner, Conrad (ed.). Aeliani Claudii opera quae extant omnia: graece latinaque ... : his acc. ind. alphabeticus copiosus. Zurich: Gesneri. (Note: Claudii Aeliani praenestini pontificis: Considered to be the first critical edition (editio princeps) of the works of this author)
- Aurelius, Marcus (1559). Gessner, Conrad (ed.). M. Antonini philosophia de seipso seu vita sua libri XII et Marini Neapolitani liber de Procli vita et felicitate. Tiguri: F. Gesnerum. (Note: M. Antonini philosophia de seipso seu vita: Gessner used a Greek manuscript, the Codex Palatinus, of Marcus Aurelius' Meditations, accompanied by a Latin translation by Wilhelm Holtzman. Since the Codex was later destroyed by fire, Gessner's version became the editio princeps)

Works in translation

- Gessner, Conrad (1937). Dock, W. (ed.). Conrad Gesner. On the Admiration of Mountains, the Prefatory Letter Addressed to Jacob Avienus, Physician, in Gesner's Pamphlet "On Milk and Substances Prepared from Milk", first Printed at Zürich in 1543. A Description of the Riven Mountain, Commonly Called Mount Pilatus, Addressed to J. Chrysostome Huber, Originally Printed with Another Work of Gesner's at Zürich in 1555. Together With: On Conrad Gesner and The Mountaineering of Theuerdank, by J. Monroe Thorington. Bibliographical Notes by W. Dock and J.M. Thorington. With illustrations. trans. Henry Douglas Bacon Soulé. San Francisco: Grabhorn Press.

== Legacy ==
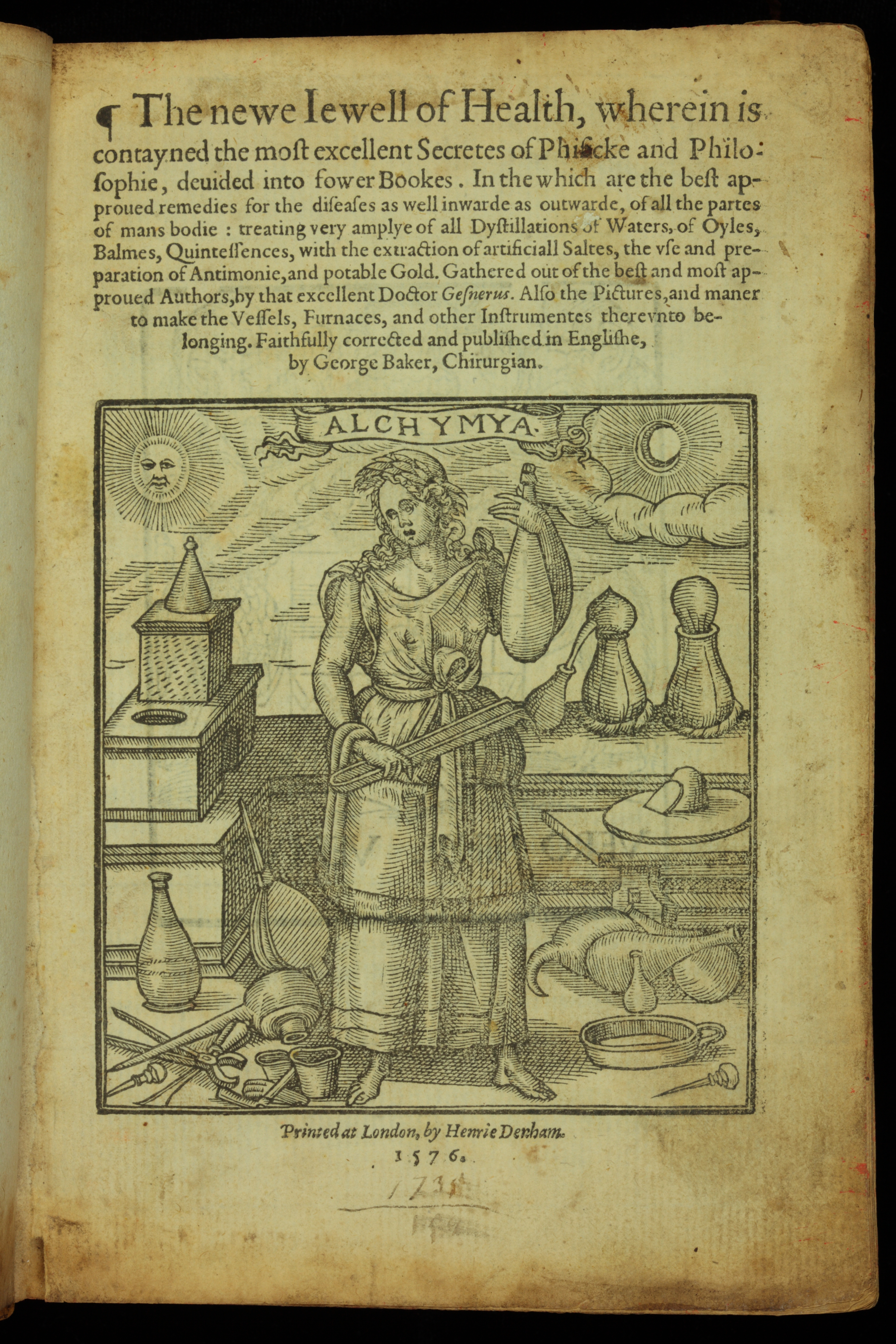
Title page from The new Iewell of Health, 1576

Gessner has been described as the father of modern scientific botany and zoology, and the father of modern bibliography. To his contemporaries he was best known as a botanist. Despite his traveling ways and the job of maintaining his own gardens, Gesner probably spent most of his time inside his own extensive library. He listed among his History of Animals sources more than 80 Greek authors and at least 175 Latin authors, as well as works by German, French, and Italian authors. He even attempted to establish a "universal library" of all books in existence. The project might sound strange to the modern mind, but Gessner invested tremendous energy in the project. He sniffed through remote libraries along with the collections of the Vatican Library and catalogs of printers and booksellers. By assembling this universal library of information, Gessner put together a database centuries before computers would ease such work. He cut relevant passages out of books, grouped the cuttings by general theme, subdivided the groups into more specific categories, and boxed them. He could then retrieve and arrange the cuttings as needed. In the words of science writer Anna Pavord, "He was a one-man search engine, a 16th-century Google with the added bonus of critical evaluation."

To his contemporaries, Gessner was known as "the Swiss Pliny." According to legend, when he knew his time was near, he asked to be taken to his library where he had spent so much of his life, to die among his favorite books. At the time of his death, Gesner had published 72 books, and written 18 more unpublished manuscripts. His work on plants was not published until centuries after his death.

In 1576 George Baker published a translation of the Evonymus of Conrad Gessner under the title of The Newe Jewell of Health, wherein is contained the most excellent Secretes of Physicke and Philosophie divided into fower bookes. Amongst his students was Felix Plater, who became a professor of medicine, and accumulated many plant specimens, but also illustrations of animals used in Historiae animalium. A year after his death, his friend Josias Simler published a biography of Gessner. Gessner and others founded the Physikalische Gesellschaft in Zurich, which later became the Naturforschende Gesellschaft in Zürich (NGZH) in 1746, to promote the study of natural sciences. Today it is one of the oldest Swiss scientific societies. The society's annual publication, the Neujahrsblatt der Naturforschenden Gesellschaft in Zürich was devoted to a biography of Gessner in 1966, to celebrate the 400th anniversary of his death.

=== Eponomy ===
In 1753 Carl Linnaeus named Tulipa gesneriana, the type species of the Tulipa genus, in his honour. The flowering plant genus Gesneria and its family Gesneriaceae are named after him. A genus of moths is also named Gesneria after him.

=== Memorials ===
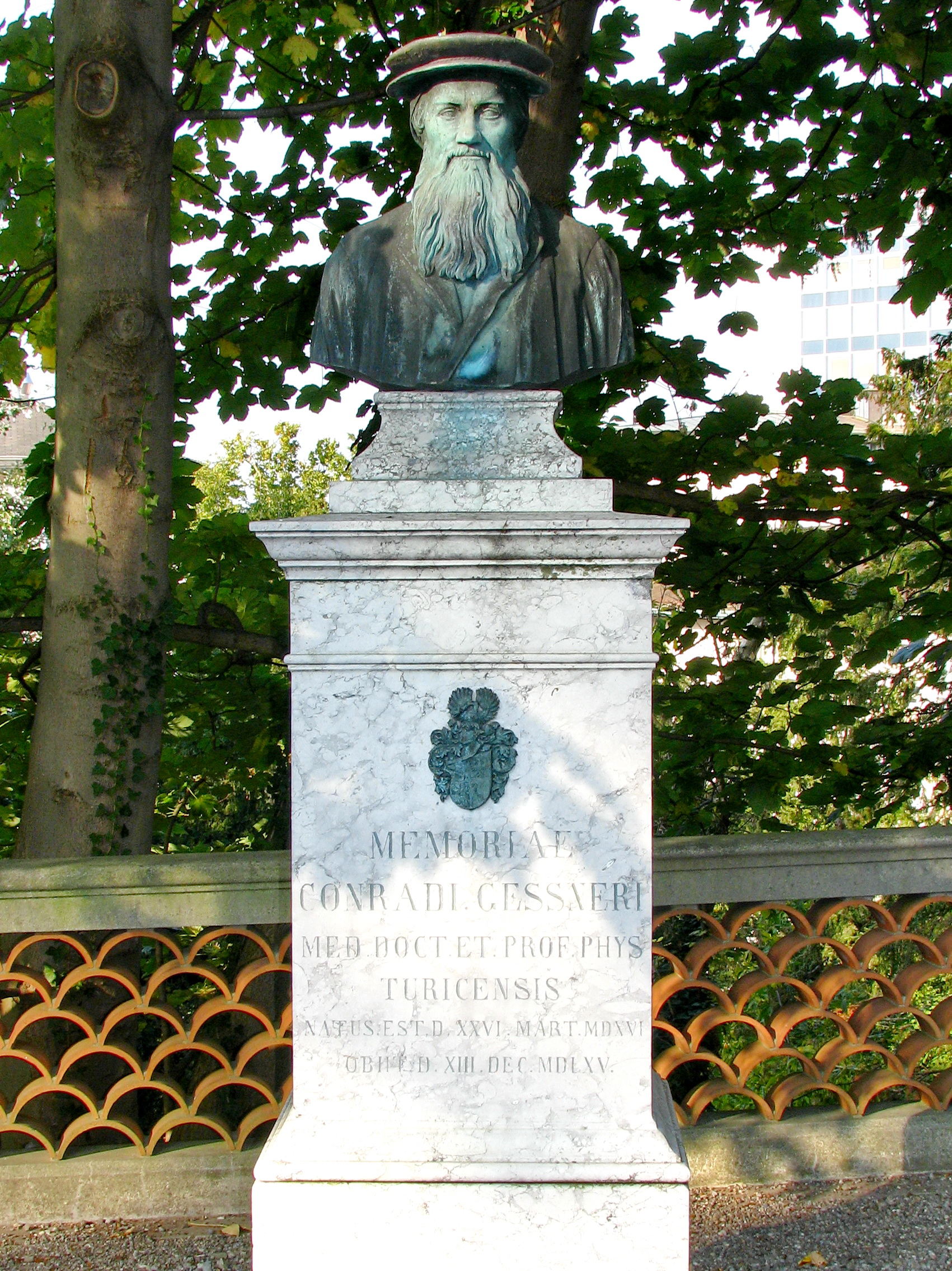
Conrad Gessner memorial, Old Botanical Garden, Zurich

- The Gessner herbal garden at the Old Botanical Garden, Zurich, is named after him, and there is a bust in the garden in his memory (see image)
- The cloister in the Carolinum, Zurich in the Grossmünster church, where Gessner is buried, also houses a herbal garden dedicated to him.
- Gessner was featured on the 50 Swiss francs banknotes issued between 1978 and 1994.
- On 16 March 2016 the State Museum in Zurich, in close collaboration with Zurich’s Central Library (Zentralbibliothek Zürich), dedicated a special exhibition to Gessner in celebration of the 500th anniversary of his birth.

== See also ==
- Bibliotheca universalis
- Historia Animalium
- Historia Plantarum
- History of botany

== Notes ==
Bibliographic notes
