= Alban Hill =

Welsh physician

Alban Hill or Hyll M.D. (d. 1559), physician, a native of Wales, studied at Oxford and at Bologna. He became famous for theoretical and practical physics at London, and much beloved and admired by all learned men. He resided for many years in the parish at St. Alban, Wood Street, being `held in great respect, and esteemed one of the chief parishioners' Caius calls him a good and learned man. He is mentioned in laudatory terms by Bassianus Landus of Piacenza in his Anatomi, 1605, vol ii. cap. xi. 225, with reference to a far from profound remark attributed to him about the uses of mesentery. Landus adds that Hill wrote on Galen, but no such writings are known to be extant. He became a fellow of the College of Physicians on 23 March 1552, was Censor from 1555 to 1558, and elect in 1558. He died on 22 Dec. 1559, and was buried in St. Alban's Church, Wood Street, near his friend and colleague, Dr. Wotton. Only the tower of the church structure may be found today. His widow survived him until 31 May 1580.
