= Bibliography =

Organized listing of books and the systematic description of them as objects

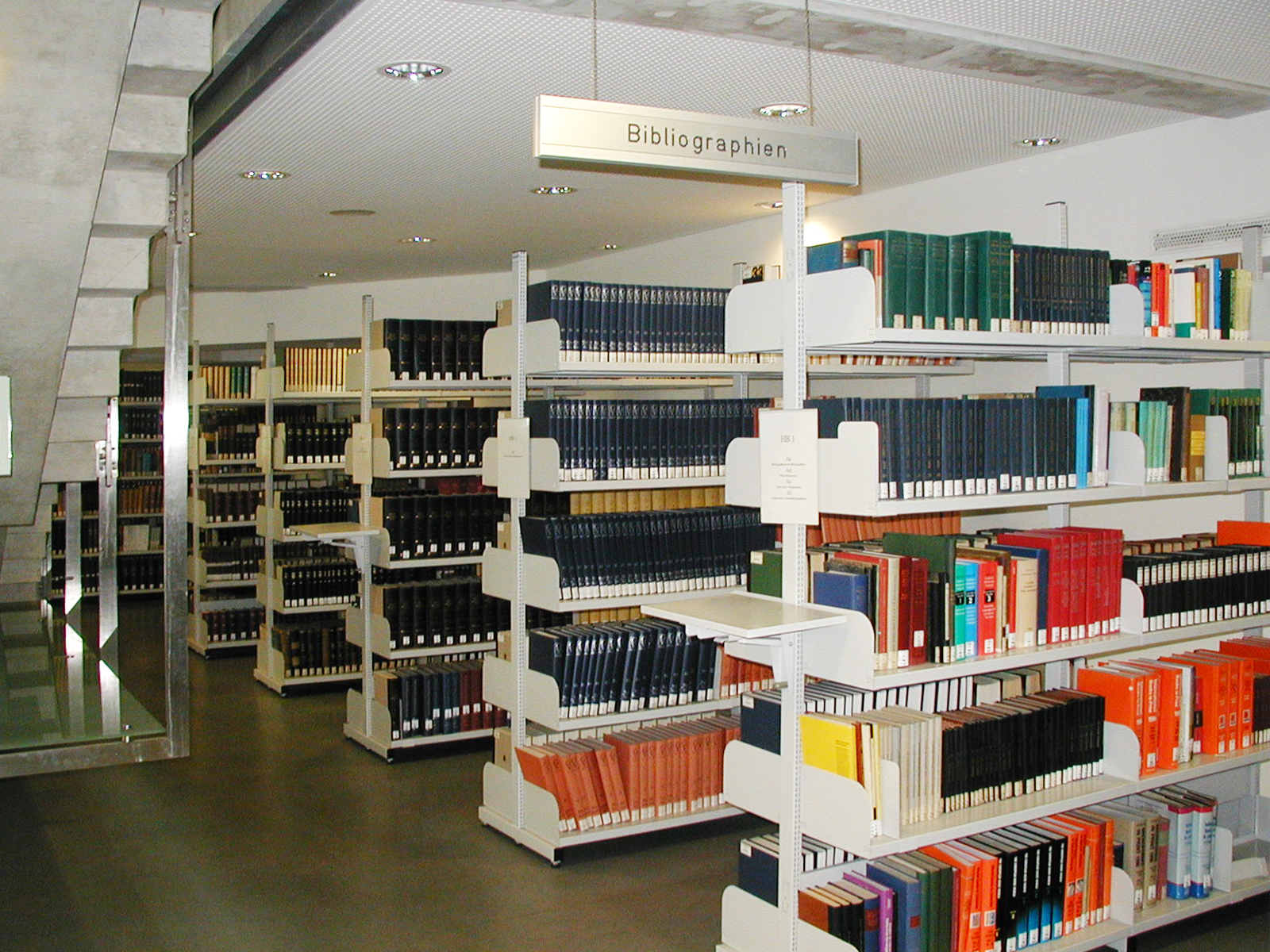
Enumerative bibliographies in the form of published books at the University of Graz Library

Bibliography (from Ancient Greek: βιβλίον, romanized: biblion, lit. 'book' and -γραφία, -graphía, 'writing') is a word with two different senses. According to English author and scholar of books John Carter, one sense, probably the more common, is a list of books, texts, or full citations for further study or of works consulted by an author (enumerative bibliography).

The other sense is "the study of books as physical objects" and "the systematic description of books as objects" (descriptive bibliography). The second sense as an academic discipline is also known as bibliology to avoid ambiguity (from Ancient Greek: -λογία, romanized: -logía). The first sense is a countable noun, as in "a bibliography", while the second refers to the mass noun "bibliography" as a general concept.

== Etymology ==
The word bibliographia (βιβλιογραφία) was used by Greek writers in the first three centuries CE to mean the copying of books by hand. In the 12th century, the word started being used for "the intellectual activity of composing books." The 17th century then saw the emergence of the modern meaning, that of description of books. Currently, the field of bibliography has expanded to include studies that consider the book as a material object. Bibliography, in its systematic pursuit of understanding the past and the present through written and printed documents, describes a way and means of extracting information from this material. Bibliographers are interested in comparing versions of texts to each other rather than in interpreting their meaning or assessing their significance.

== Field of study ==
Bibliography is a specialized aspect of library science (or library and information science, LIS) and documentation science. It was established by a Belgian, named Paul Otlet (1868–1944), who was the founder of the field of documentation, as a branch of the information sciences, who wrote about "the science of bibliography." However, there have recently been voices claiming that "the bibliographical paradigm" is obsolete, and it is not today common in LIS. A defence of the bibliographical paradigm was provided by Hjørland (2007).

The quantitative study of bibliographies is known as bibliometrics, which is today an influential subfield in LIS and is used for major collection decisions such as the cancellation of big deals, through data analysis tools like Unpaywall Journals.

== Branches ==
Carter and Barker describe bibliography as a twofold scholarly discipline—the organized listing of books (enumerative bibliography) and the systematic description of books as physical objects (descriptive bibliography). These two distinct concepts and practices have separate rationales and serve differing purposes. Innovators and originators in the field include W. W. Greg, Fredson Bowers, Philip Gaskell and G. Thomas Tanselle.

Bowers (1949) refers to enumerative bibliography as a procedure that identifies books in "specific collections or libraries," in a specific discipline, by an author, printer, or period of production (3). He refers to descriptive bibliography as the systematic description of a book as a material or physical artefact. Analytical bibliography, the cornerstone of descriptive bibliography, investigates the printing and all physical features of a book that yield evidence establishing a book's history and transmission (Feather 10). It is the preliminary phase of bibliographic description and provides the vocabulary, principles and techniques of analysis that descriptive bibliographers apply and on which they base their descriptive practice.

Descriptive bibliographers follow specific conventions and associated classification in their description. Titles and title pages are transcribed in a quasi-facsimile style and representation. Illustration, typeface, binding, paper, and all physical elements related to identifying a book follow formulaic conventions, as Bowers established in his foundational opus, The Principles of Bibliographic Description. Fundamentally, analytical bibliography is concerned with objective, physical analysis and history of a book while descriptive bibliography employs all data that analytical bibliography furnishes and then codifies it with a view to identifying the ideal copy or form of a book that most nearly represents the printer's initial conception and intention in printing.

In addition to viewing bibliographic study as being composed of four interdependent approaches (enumerative, descriptive, analytical, and textual), Bowers notes two further subcategories of research, namely historical bibliography and aesthetic bibliography. Both historical bibliography, which involves the investigation of printing practices, tools, and related documents, and aesthetic bibliography, which examines the art of designing type and books, are often employed by analytical bibliographers.

D. F. McKenzie extended previous notions of bibliography as set forth by Greg, Bowers, Gaskell and Tanselle. He describes the nature of bibliography as "the discipline that studies texts as recorded forms, and the processes of their transmission, including their production and reception" (1999 12). This concept broadens the scope of bibliography to include "non-book texts" and an accounting for their material form and structure, as well as textual variations, technical and production processes that bring sociocultural context and effects into play. McKenzie's perspective contextualizes textual objects or artefacts with sociological and technical factors that have an effect on production, transmission and, ultimately, ideal copy (2002 14). Bibliography, generally, concerns the material conditions of books [as well as other texts] how they are designed, edited, printed, circulated, reprinted, collected.

Bibliographic works differ in the amount of detail depending on the purpose and can generally be divided into two categories: enumerative bibliography (also called compilative, reference or systematic), which results in an overview of publications in a particular category and analytical or critical bibliography, which studies the production of books. In earlier times, bibliography mostly focused on books. Now, both categories of bibliography cover works in other media including audio recordings, motion pictures and videos, graphic objects, databases, CD-ROMs and websites.

=== Enumerative bibliography ===
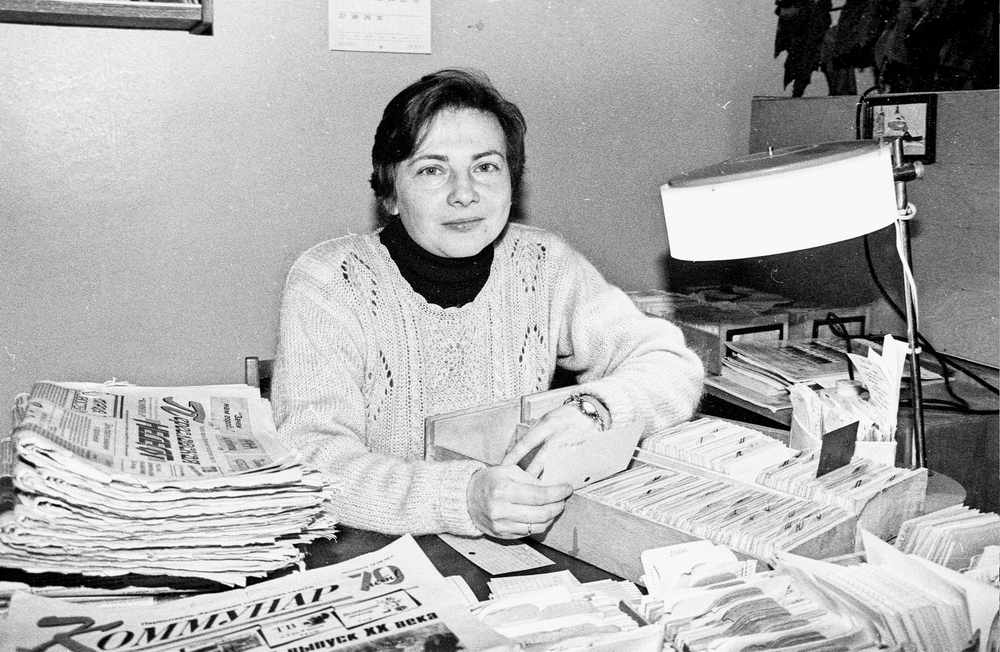
Bibliographer workplace in Russia

An enumerative bibliography is a systematic list of books and other works such as journal articles. Bibliographies range from "works cited" lists at the end of books and articles, to complete and independent publications. A notable example of a complete, independent publication is Gow's A. E. Housman: A Sketch, Together with a List of His Classical Papers (1936). As separate works, they may be in bound volumes such as those shown on the right, or computerized bibliographic databases. A library catalog, while not referred to as a "bibliography", is bibliographic in nature. Bibliographical works are almost always considered to be tertiary sources.

Enumerative bibliographies are based on a unifying principle such as creator, subject, date, topic or other characteristic. An entry in an enumerative bibliography provides the core elements of a text resource including a title, the creator(s), publication date and place of publication. Belanger (1977) distinguishes an enumerative bibliography from other bibliographic forms such as descriptive bibliography, analytical bibliography or textual bibliography in that its function is to record and list, rather than describe a source in detail or with any reference to the source's physical nature, materiality or textual transmission. The enumerative list may be comprehensive or selective. One noted example would be Tanselle's bibliography that exhaustively enumerates topics and sources related to all forms of bibliography. A more common and particular instance of an enumerative bibliography relates to specific sources used or considered in preparing a scholarly paper or academic term paper.

Citation styles vary. An entry for a book in a bibliography usually contains the following elements:

- Creator(s)
- Title
- Place of publication
- Publisher or printer
- Date of publication

An entry for a journal or periodical article usually contains:

- Creator(s)
- Article title
- journal title
- volume
- pages
- date of publication

A bibliography may be arranged by author, topic, or some other scheme. Annotated bibliographies give descriptions about how each source is useful to an author in constructing a paper or argument. These descriptions, usually a few sentences long, provide a summary of the source and describe its relevance. Reference management software may be used to keep track of references and generate bibliographies as required.

Bibliographies differ from library catalogs by including only relevant items rather than all items present in a particular library. However, the catalogs of some national libraries effectively serve as national bibliographies, as the national libraries own almost all their countries' publications.

=== Descriptive bibliography ===
Fredson Bowers described and formulated a standardized practice of descriptive bibliography in his Principles of Bibliographical Description (1949). Scholars to this day treat Bowers' scholarly guide as authoritative. In this classic text, Bowers describes the basic function of bibliography as, "[providing] sufficient data so that a reader may identify the book described, understand the printing, and recognize the precise contents" (124). Descriptive bibliography "is a form of biographical, and thus historical, scholarship."

==== Descriptive bibliographies as scholarly product ====
They usually include information on the book as a material object:

- Format and Collation/Pagination Statement (broadsheet, folio, quarto, or several further possibilities)
- Binding—a description of the binding techniques (generally for books printed after 1800)
- Title Page Transcription—a transcription of the title page, including rule lines and ornaments
- Contents—a listing of the contents (by section) in the book
- Paper—a description of the physical properties of the paper, including production process, an account of chain-line measurements, and a description of watermarks (if present)
- Illustrations—a description of the illustrations found in the book, including printing process (e.g. woodblock, intaglio, etc.), measurements, and locations in the text
- Presswork—miscellaneous details gleaned from the text about its production
- Copies Examined—an enumeration of the copies examined, including those copies' location (i.e. belonging to which library or collector)

=== Analytical bibliography ===
This branch of the bibliographic discipline examines the material features of a textual artefact—such as type, ink, paper, imposition, format, impressions and states of a book—to essentially recreate the conditions of its production. Analytical bibliography often uses collateral evidence—such as general printing practices, trends in format, responses and non-responses to design, etc.—to scrutinize the historical conventions and influences underlying the physical appearance of a text. The bibliographer utilizes knowledge gained from the investigation of physical evidence in the form of a descriptive bibliography or textual bibliography. Descriptive bibliography is the close examination and cataloging of a text as a physical object, recording its size, format, binding, and so on, while textual bibliography (or textual criticism) identifies variations—and the aetiology of variations—in a text with a view to determining "the establishment of the most correct form of [a] text" (Bowers 498[1]).

== Bibliographers ==
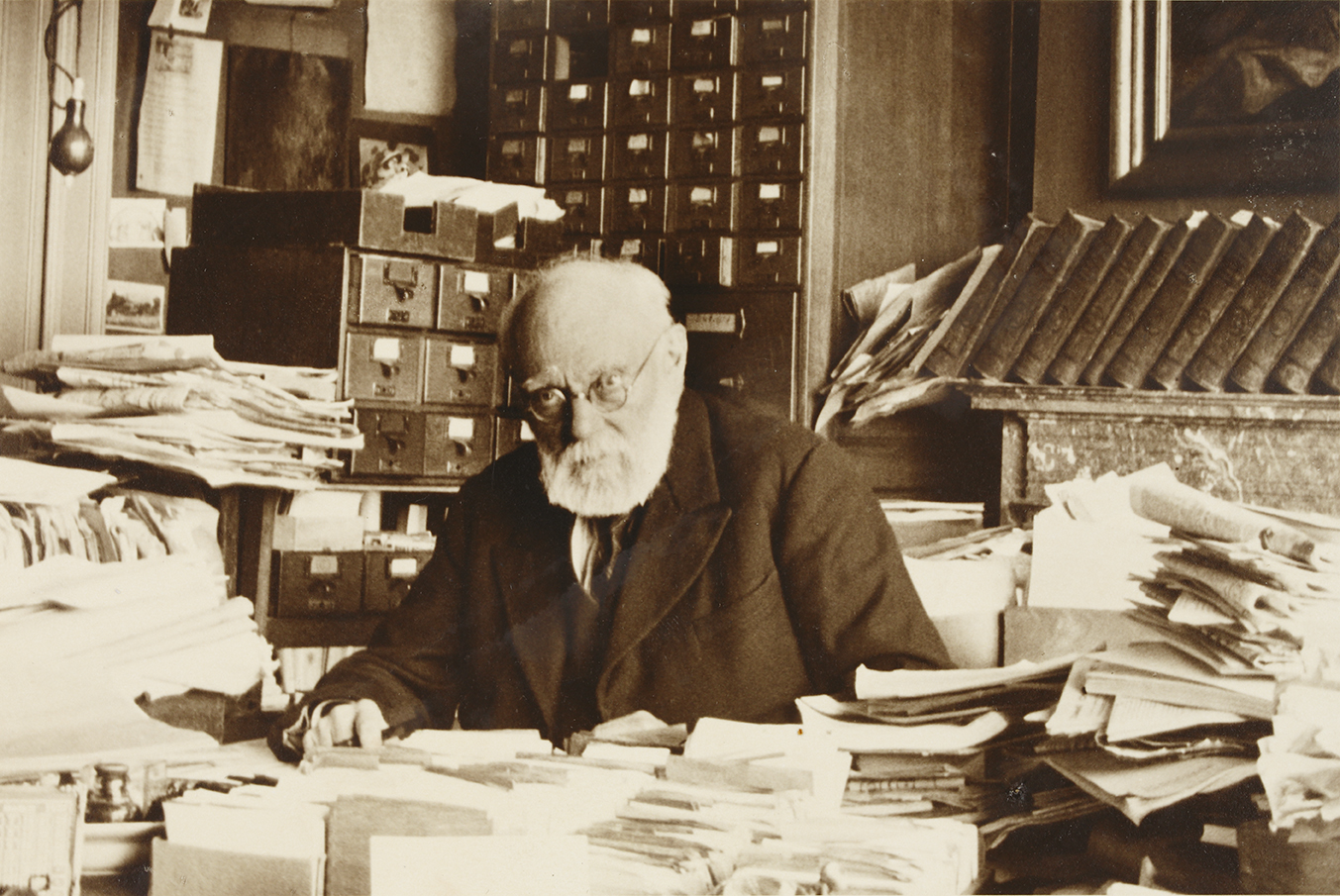
Paul Otlet, working in an office built at his home following the closure of the Palais Mondial, in June 1937

A bibliographer is a person who describes and lists books and other publications, with particular attention to such characteristics as authorship, publication date, edition, typography, etc. A person who limits such efforts to a specific field or discipline is a subject bibliographer.

A bibliographer, in the technical meaning of the word, is anyone who writes about books. But the accepted meaning since at least the 18th century is a person who attempts a comprehensive account—sometimes just a list, sometimes a fuller reckoning—of the books written on a particular subject. In the present, bibliography is no longer a career, generally speaking; bibliographies tend to be written on highly specific subjects and by specialists in the field.

The term bibliographer is sometimes—in particular subject bibliographer—today used about certain roles performed in libraries and bibliographic databases.

One of the first bibliographers was Conrad Gessner who sought to list all books printed in Latin, Greek and Hebrew in Bibliotheca Universalis (1545). Julius Petzholdt and Theodore Besterman also attempted to be comprehensive.

== Non-book material ==
Systematic lists of media other than books can be referred to with terms formed analogously to bibliography:

- Discography—recorded music
- Filmography—films
- Webography (or webliography)—websites (Note: The first use of the word "webliography" recorded in the Oxford English Dictionary dates from June 1995.)
- Arachniography, a term coined by NASA research historian Andrew J. Butrica, which means a reference list of URLs about a particular subject. It is equivalent to a bibliography in a book. The name derives from arachne in reference to a spider and its web.

== See also ==
- Bibliographic index – Resource for finding publications
- Citation – Reference to a source
- Citation creator – Tools which facilitate the creation of works cited and bibliographies
- History of books
- Indexing and abstracting service – Service that provides summaries and descriptions of documents
- ISO 690 – ISO standard for bibliographic referencing
- Metabibliography – Bibliography of bibliographies
- Reference table – Values that a data element may contain
- Style guide – Standard for writing and design of documents
- Textual scholarship – Academic analysis of texts
