= Jack Anthony (musician) =

American singer-songwriter

- Born: Jack Anthony Svicarevich; May 20, 1982 (age 44); Harbor City, California, US
- Genres: Rock, acoustic rock, punk rock
- Occupation: singer
- Instruments: Guitar vocals bass drums
- Years active: 2003–present

Jack Anthony Svicarevich (born May 20, 1982) is an American singer-songwriter, composer and musician. A Southern California native, Jack was born in Harbor City and raised in San Pedro.

== Early career ==
With an early interest in music, Jack began playing guitar at the age of 10. By high school he was playing in numerous garage bands and performing at various Southern California venues, while simultaneously working on his solo project.

In 1999, after hearing a Jack Anthony demo given to him by a local radio station DJ, Drive Thru Records president Richard Reines contacted Jack and began offering him advice. He also put him in touch with Max Bemis, who had recently formed Say Anything. The two appeared together at the Roxy in 2001, and Jack appears in the thank yous of the rare Say Anything release, entitled "Junior Varsity".

== 2003 to present ==
In 2003, Jack released his first solo album, "Disaster". Having performed everything on the album with the exception of the drums (played by Seth Barnes) and some backup vocals, Jack also handled most of the album's promotion. After receiving an invite to open for Home Grown at an Oktoberfest event at UCI, Jack had to quickly piece a band together. Along with his good friends and former band mates David Miller and Seth Barnes, the three comprised the first official Jack Anthony solo performance.

=== The Untitled EP ===
By 2005, the Jack Anthony lineup had changed slightly. In May, along with Seth Barnes, Ryan Lai, and new drummer Ruben Reitor, Jack Anthony recorded a four song EP, simply titled "the Untitled EP", which was officially released in 2006. The first track, "Averill Park", borrows its name from Averill Park, a local attraction in Jack's hometown of San Pedro. A music video for the song was eventually filmed inside the park itself, and it currently has over 350,000 views on YouTube. It was directed by screenwriter/director Benji Samit.

=== Garage Band Makeover ===
In early 2006, shortly after Mike Crisis joined the band as the new official drummer, the Jack Anthony band was asked by MTV to take part in a brand new reality show called Garage Band Makeover. Hosted by Story of the Year singer Dan Marsala, the show followed the band as they underwent changes to improve their image and performance. This was the only episode of the show ever filmed.

=== Spirits and the Scattered Screen ===
Jack Anthony's second full length studio album, Spirits and the Scattered Screen, was much more of a collaborative effort than the first. As opposed to "Disaster", which was completely written and almost exclusively performed by Jack himself, this album featured songs co-written by both Ryan Lai as well as Seth Barnes. It is also the only Jack Anthony recording that features Mike Crisis on the drums. A music video was later filmed for the song "Bad Habitat", directed by Clenet Verdi-Rose. Another track from the album, "Cloudy Daze", appeared in the upcoming horror film "Little Fu****: the Last True Party Animal".

=== Cue the Clouds ===
On December 17, 2011, Jack Anthony released "Cue the Clouds". Featuring no percussion other than a tambourine on one track, this collection of acoustic guitar driven songs was the first Jack Anthony release in roughly five years. The album release show was held on December 17, 2011, at the Grand Annex in San Pedro, CA. The album contains 10 original tracks (including one co-written with and performed by Seth Barnes) as well as one cover of Words I Might Have Ate by Green Day.

== Composing ==
In addition to the official Jack Anthony music, he also composes pieces in various genres on occasion for commercials as well as independent films. Under the pseudonym "Jack Move", he also produces music for a local hip hop group called the Medicated Machines.

== Discography ==
| Release date | Album | Label |
|---|---|---|
| 2003 | Disaster | DropOut Music |
| 2005 | The Untitled EP | DropOut Music |
| 2006 | Spirits and the Scattered Screen | DropOut Music |
| 2011 | Cue the Clouds | Self-Release |
