= John Anthony (footballer) =

Australian rules footballer (born 1953)

Personal information
- Full name: John Anthony
- Born: 27 October 1953 (age 73)
- Original team: East Devonport
- Height: 191 cm (6 ft 3 in)
- Weight: 81 kg (179 lb)

Playing career^{1}
Years	Club	Games (Goals)
1972	St Kilda	3 (0)
- ^{1} Playing statistics correct to the end of 1972.

John Anthony (born 27 October 1953) is a former Australian rules footballer who played with St Kilda in the Victorian Football League (VFL).
