= Konrad Pellikan =

German Protestant theologian, humanist, Protestant reformer and Christian Hebraist

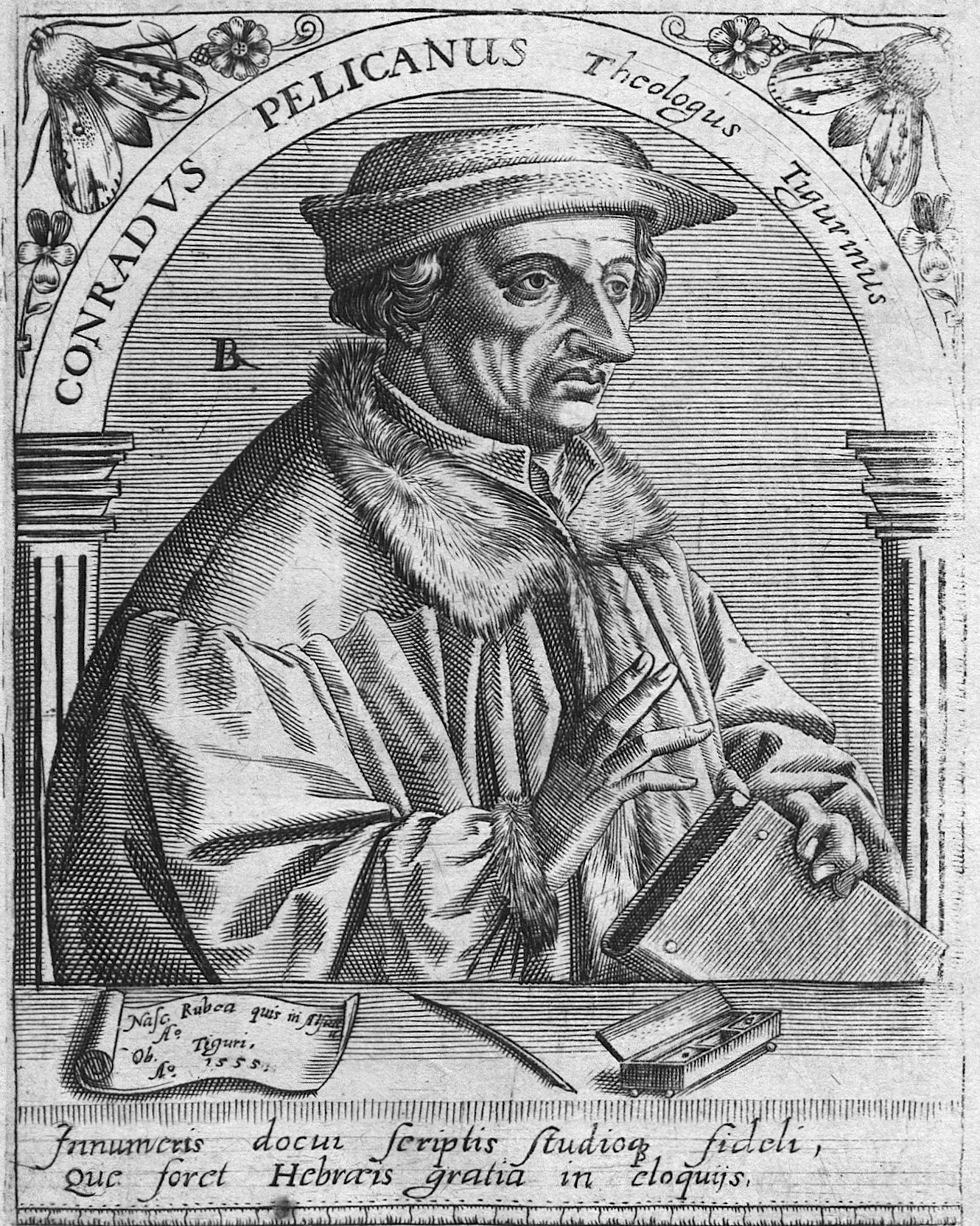
Konrad Pellikan

Konrad Pellikan (German: Conrad Kürsner; Latin: Conradus Pellicanus; sometimes anglicized as Conrad Pellican; 8 January 1478 – 6 April 1556) was an Alsatian Protestant theologian, humanist, Protestant reformer and Christian Hebraist who worked chiefly in Switzerland.

== Life ==
Pellikan was born on 8 January 1478 in Rouffach, Alsace. His German surname, "Kurscherer" ("Kürsner") was changed to "Pellicanus" by his mother's brother, Jodocus Gallus, an ecclesiastic connected with the University of Heidelberg, who supported his nephew for sixteen months at the university in 1491-1492. On returning to Rouffach, he entered the Franciscan convent. There he taught gratis at the convents school in order he might borrow books from the library, and in his sixteenth year resolved to become a friar. This step helped his studies, for he was sent to Tübingen in 1496 and became a favorite pupil of the guardian of the Minorite convent there, Paulus Scriptoris, a man of considerable general learning.

He taught Hebrew, Greek, mathematics and cosmography at the Franciscan monastery of St. Katherina in Rouffach, in the upper Alsace. He subsequently taught at Pforzheim and Tübingen. There seems to have been at that time in southwest Germany a considerable amount of sturdy independent thought among the Franciscans; Pellikan himself became a Protestant very gradually, and without any such revulsion of feeling as marked Martin Luther's conversion. At Tübingen the future "apostate in three languages" was able to begin the study of Hebrew. He had no teacher and no grammar; but Paulus Scriptoris carried him a huge codex of the prophets on his own shoulders all the way from Mainz.

He learned the letters from the transcription of a few verses in the Star of the Messiah of Petrus Niger, and, with a subsequent hint or two from Johannes Reuchlin, who also lent him the grammar of Moses Kimhi, made his way through the Bible for himself with the help of Jerome's Latin. In 1501 he became the first Christian to compose a Hebrew grammar. It was printed in 1503, and afterwards included in Reysch's Margarita philosophica. Hebrew remained a favorite study to the last.

Pellikan became a priest in 1501 and following entered the Barfüsser convent in Basel in 1502. At that time he also taught at the Franciscan monastery in Basel. His four year stay in Basel was an influential event, and he kept also contributing to the works of the Basel printers during his temporary departure. In Basel he did much laborious work for Froben's editions, and came to the conclusion that the Church taught many doctrines of which the early doctors of Christianity knew nothing. He spoke his views frankly, but he disliked polemic; he found also more toleration than might have been expected, even after he became active in circulating Luther's books. Thus, supported by the civic authorities, he remained guardian of the convent of his order at Basel from 1519 until 1524, and even when he had to give up his post, remained in the monastery for two years. In 1523, he was appointed professor for theology in the University of Basel. His lectures concerned the Book of Genesis, and Salomon in the Old Testament. At length, when the position was becoming quite untenable, in 1526, he followed a call from Zwingli to become a professor of Greek and Hebrew at the Carolinum in Zürich. Formally throwing off his monk's habit, Pellikan entered on a new life. Here he remained until his death on 6 April 1556.

== Works ==
Pellikan wrote the Chronikon and also translated Hebrew works into Latin, such as Bahya ben Asher's commentary on the Torah and the work of Pirkei De-Rabbi Eliezer (Eliezer filius Hircani), the Liber sententiarum Judiacarum, in 1546.

Pellikan's autobiography describes the gradual multiplication of accessible books on the subjects, and he not only studied but translated a vast mass of rabbinical and Talmudic texts, his interest in Jewish literature being mainly philological. The chief fruit of these studies is the vast commentary on the Bible (Zürich, 7 vols., 1532–1539), which shows a remarkably sound judgment on questions of the text, and a sense for historical as opposed to typological exegesis. Pellikan's scholarship, though not brilliant, was really extensive; his sound sense, and his singularly pure and devoted character gave him a great influence.

He was remarkably free from the pedantry of the time, as is shown by his views about the use of the German vernacular as a vehicle of culture (Chron. 135, 36). As a theologian his natural affinities were with Zwingli, having grown up to the views of the Reformation, by the natural progress of his studies and religious life. Thus he never lost his sympathy with humanism and Erasmus.

Pellikan's Latin autobiography (Das Chronikon des Konrad Pellikan) is one of the most interesting documents of the period. It was first published by Riggenbach in 1877, and in this volume the other sources for his life are registered.

Early modern imprints

- De modo legendi et intelligendi Hebraeum. Strasbourg, 1504.
- Quadruplex Psalterium. Basel, 1516.
- Commentarii in prophetas, 1525.
- Quadruplex Psalterium Davidis. Strasbourg, 1527.
- Explicatio libelli Ruth. Zürich, 1531.
- Comentaria bibliorum. 7 volumes. Zürich, 1532-1539.
- Index bibliorum. Zürich, 1537.
- Commentaria Bibliorum Et Illa Brevia Quidem Ac Catholica, 1538.
- Ruth: Ein heylig Büchlin des alten Testament, mit einer schoenen kurtzen außlegung. Zürich, 1555.
- A Briefe and Compendiouse Table, with Heinrich Bullinger and Leo Juda

Modern editions

- Die Hauschronik Konrad Pellikans von Rufach. trans. Theodor Vulpinus, Strasbourg: Heitz, 1892.
- Das Chronikon des Konrad Pellikan, ed. Bernhard Riggenbach. Basel, 1877

Bibliography

- See Erich Wenneker, "Pellikan, Konrad" in Biographisch-Bibliographisches Kirchenlexikon, vol. VII, Herzberg, 1994, col. 180-183, online article

== Sources ==
Academic offices
Preceded by ?	Chair of Hebrew at the Carolinum, Zürich; 1526–1556	Succeeded by Peter Martyr Vermigli
