= Historia Plantarum (Gessner) =

1565 encyclopedia by Conrad Gessner

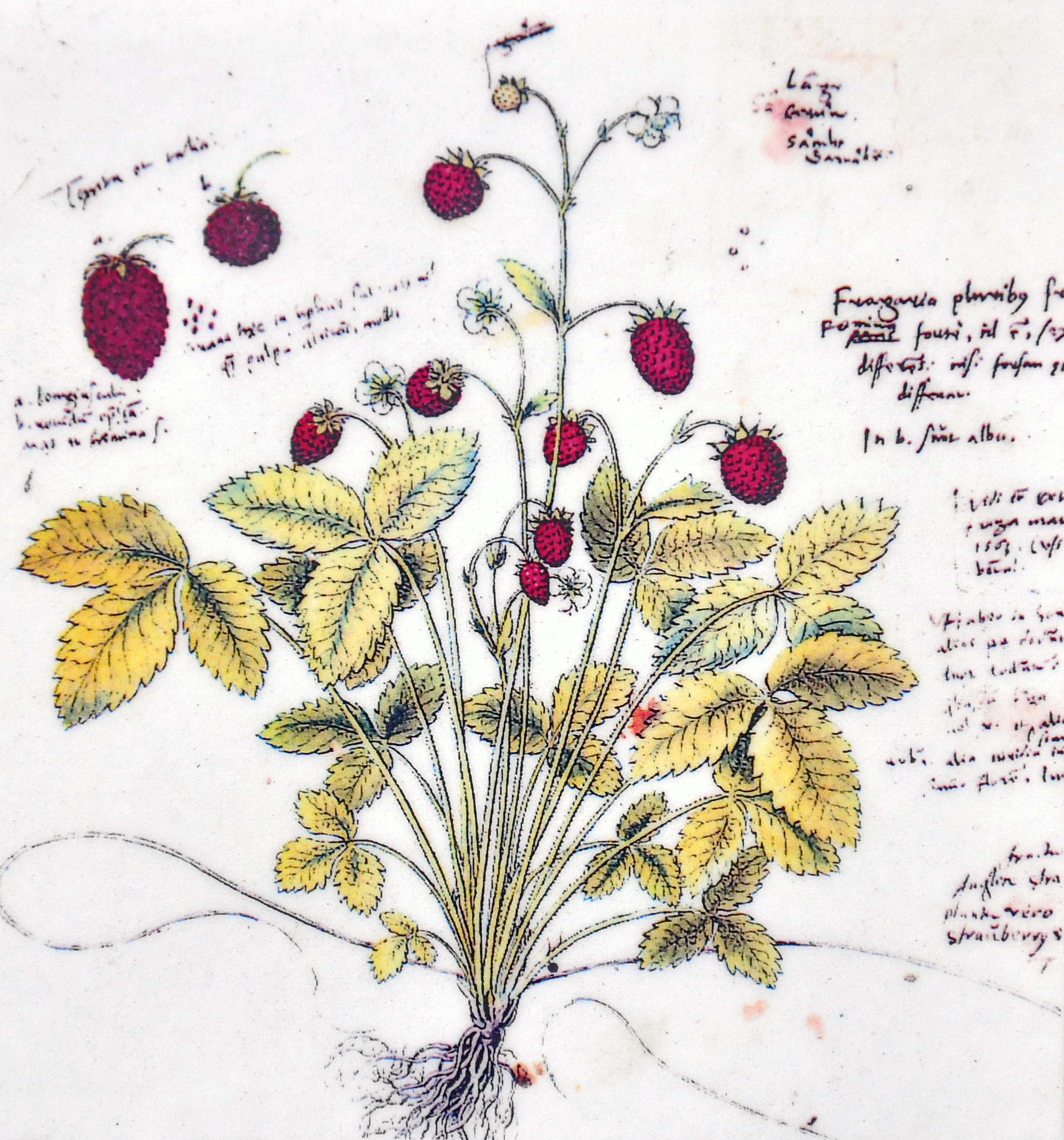
Wild strawberry from Historia Plantarum.

Historia Plantarum (also called Conradi Gesneri Historia Plantarum) is an extensive botanical encyclopedia by the Swiss natural scientist, Conrad Gessner (1516 – 1565). Although compiled between 1555 and 1565, it was not published till 1754, since he died of the plague, prior to its completion. To complete the work, he amassed a collection of some 1,500 drawings of plants, most of which were his own work. The scale and scientific rigour were unusual for the time, and Gessner was a skilled artist, producing detailed drawings of specific plant parts that illustrated their characteristics, with extensive marginal notation discussing their growth form and habitation.

== Reprints ==
- Heinrich Zoller, Martin Steinmann (ed.): Conrad Gesner: Conradi Gesneri Historia plantarum. Gesamtausgabe. Urs-Graf-Verlag, Dietikon-Zürich 1987/1991

== Bibliography ==
- Gessner, Conrad (1754) [1555–1565]. Schmidel, Casimir Christoph; Trew, Christoph Jacob (eds.). Conradi Gesneri philosophi et medici celeberrimi Opera botanica, per duo saecula desiderata, vitam avctoris et operis historiam Cordi librvm qvintvm cvm adnotationibvs Gesneri in totvm opvs vt et Wolphii fragmentvm historiae plantarvm Gesnerianae adivnctis, indicibvs iconvm tam olim editarvm qvam nvnc prodevntivm cvm figvris vltra CCCC. minoris formae, partim ligno excisis partim aeri inscvlptis complectentia, qvae ex bibliotheca D. Christophori Iacobi Trew ... nvnc primvm in lvcem edidit et praefatvs est D. Casimirvs Christophorvs Schmiedel. Nuremberg: Impensis Io. Mich. Seligmanni, typis Io. Iosephi Fleischmanni.
- Schulze, Sabine, ed. (2006). Gärten: Ordnung, Inspiration, Glück (in German). Frankfurt am Main: Städel Museum, and Hatje Cantz Verlag. ISBN 978-3-7757-1870-7.
