= Jakob Ceporin =

Swiss humanist

Jakob Ceporin or Ceporinus (Jakob Wiesendanger, 1499–1525) was a Swiss humanist. In the town of Dinhard, Ceporin was the son of a wealthy farmer. He studied at the school of Latin at Winterthur before attending the Universities of Cologne and Vienna.

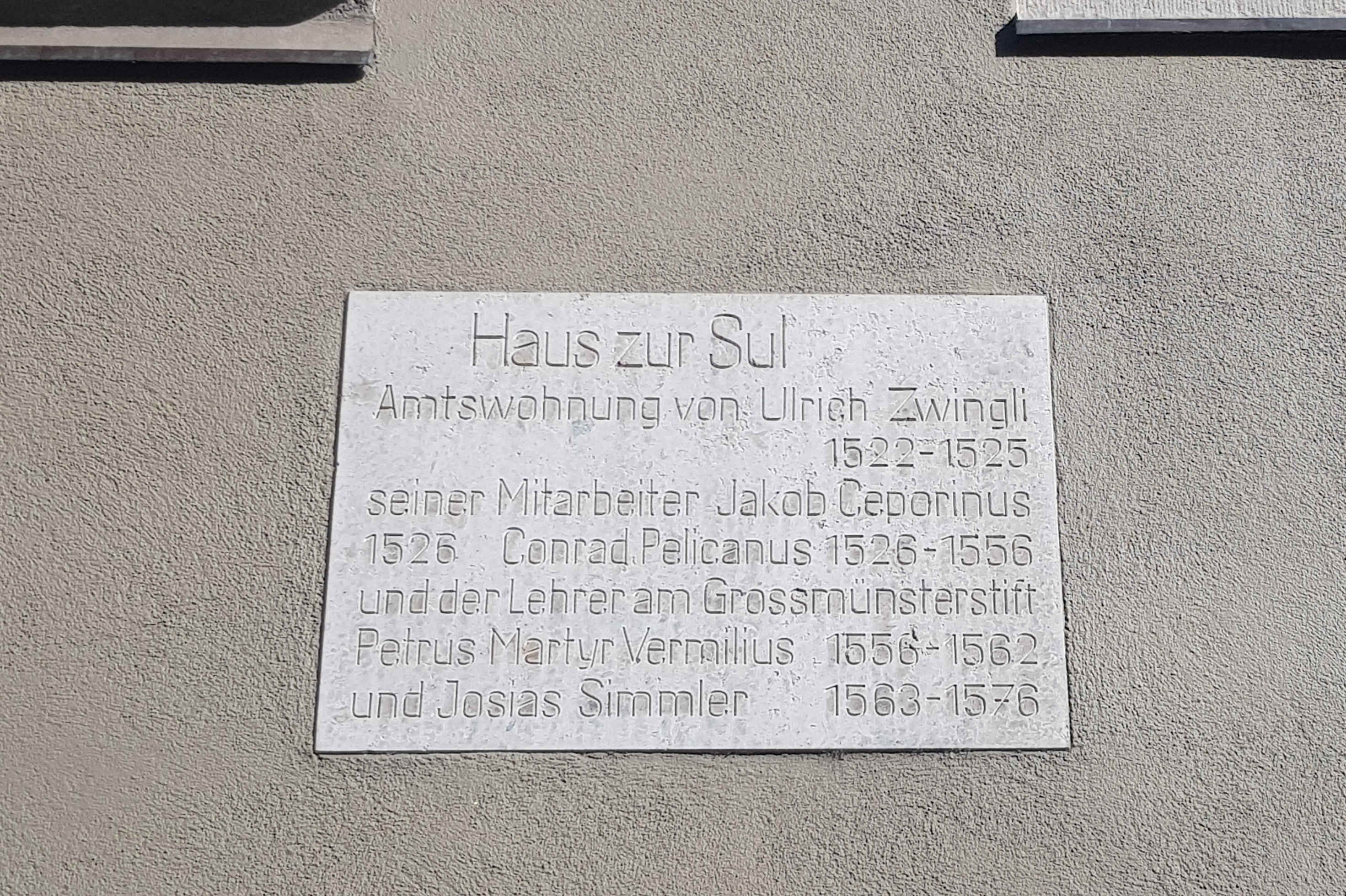
Plaque on the "Haus zur Sul", Kirchgasse 20, Zurich with an inscription about Jakob Ceporinus

He acquired knowledge of Hebrew after studying with the German humanist Johannes Reuchlin in Ingolstadt, knowledge of which would prove useful to him when he later became an inhabitant of Zürich, a stronghold of the Protestant Reformation in Switzerland. He worked in Basel as a proof-reader in the service of a printing house. Around the second half of 1523, Ceporin married Elsbeth Scherer, a former Dominican nun of the monastery of Töss. This marriage produced a daughter—Veronika—who later became the wife of the scholar Konrad Klauser.

On 14 April 1525, Ceporin was appointed as the first Reader of Greek and Hebrew at Zwingli's school of theology in Zürich. Though a young man when he was appointed, his skill in languages had impressed his contemporaries; Zwingli was especially impressed by his wide knowledge. Ceporin's short book on Greek grammar (published 1522) was reprinted in many editions and was still in use in the eighteenth century in Swiss schools. Ceporin died unexpectedly at the early age of 26, on 20 December in Zürich.

After the fashion of the time, Wiesendanger chose the name Ceporin as the Greek equivalent of his Swiss surname (from κηπουρός "gardener").

== Sources ==
- E. Egli, "Ceporins Leben und Schr.," Analecta Reformatoria 2, 1901, pp. 145–160.
- Ein Philologe an Zwinglis Seite (in German) [link broken]
