= John Anthony (physician) =

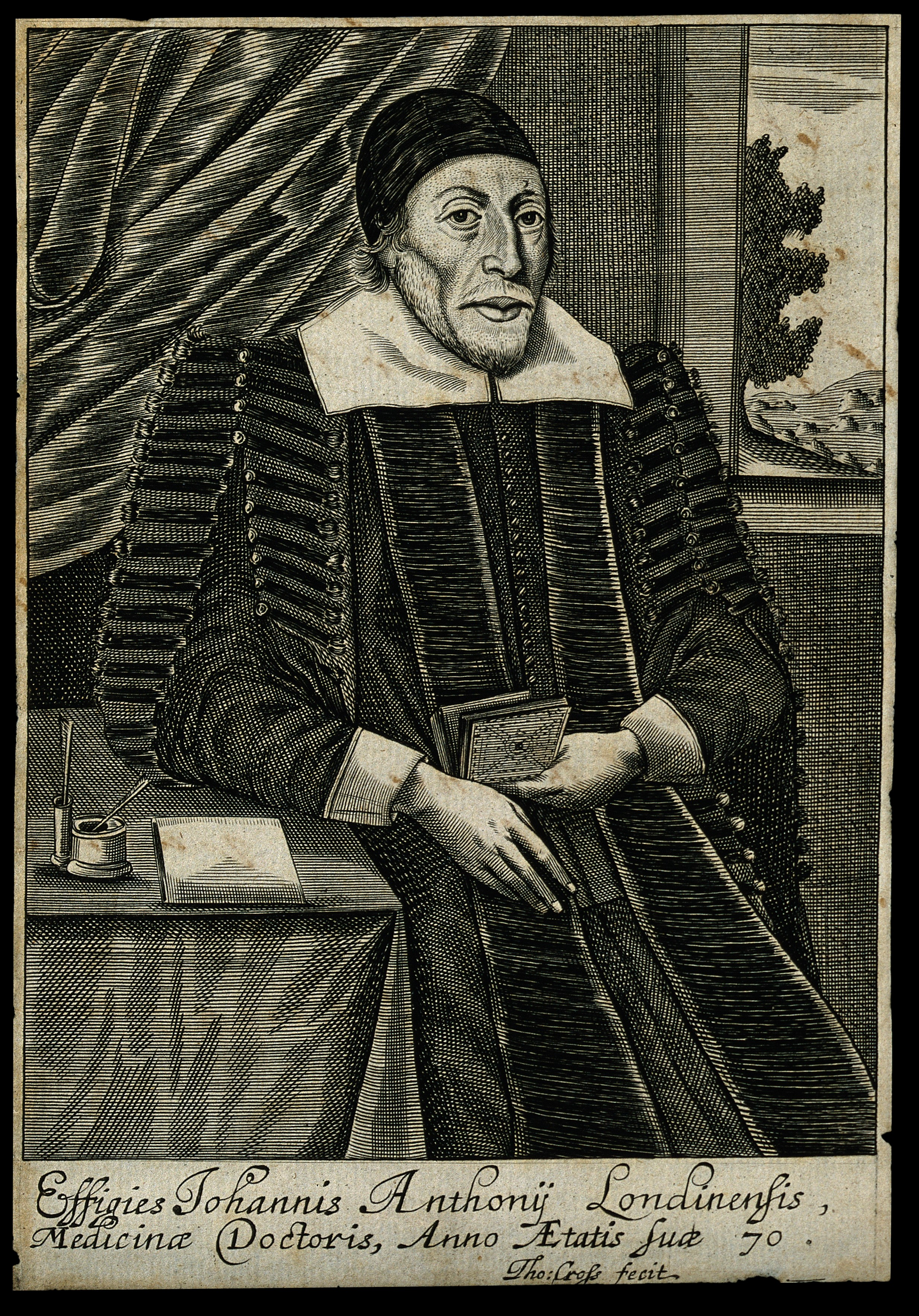
John Anthony Line engraving by T. Cross, 1656. W

John Anthony (1585 – 28 April 1655) was an English physician.

Anthony was the son of Francis Anthony. He was educated at Pembroke College, Cambridge, graduating as M.B. in 1613, M.D. in 1619. He was admitted as a licentiate of the College of Physicians, London, in 1625. He gained a handsome income from the sale of his father's "Aurum Potabile", or "Drinkable Gold"^{[a]} and succeeded to the more reputable part of his father's practice.^{[b]}

John Anthony served in the English Civil War, on the parliamentary side, as surgeon to a Colonel Sandys.^{[c]} He was the author of a devotional work, The Comfort of the Soul, laid down by way of Meditation.^{[d]} The same work in the same impression was afterwards issued with a new title-page as Lucas Redivivus, or the Gospel Physician.

In the British Museum^{[e]} is a small notebook, bound with the arms of Charles I, entitled Joannis Antonii Praxis Medica, containing notes in Latin on various diseases and their treatment. In it Paracelsus is quoted as the authority for a certain prescription. The notes are evidently not intended for publication, but clearly belong to this John Anthony.

== Notes ==
According to the Biographia Britannica

According to Dr. Munk

(Mercurius Rusticus, ed. 1685, p. 125)

by John Anthony, Dr. of Physick, London, 1654, 4to

(Sloane MS. 489)
