= Edward Wotton (zoologist) =

English physician and zoologist

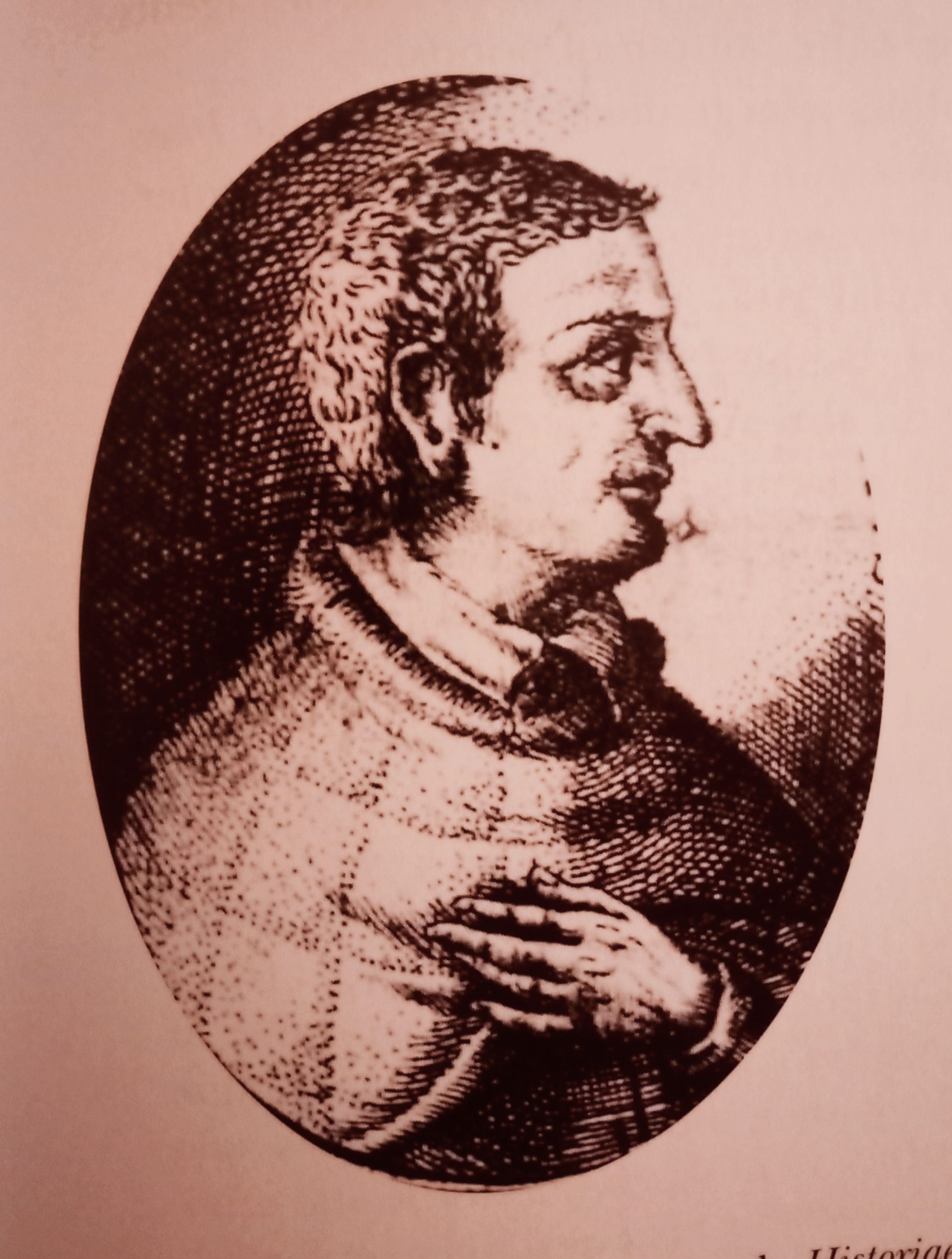
An engraving by William Rogers c. 1600

Edward Wotton (1492 – 5 October 1555) was an English physician, born in Oxford, credited with starting the modern study of zoology, by separating out much of the fanciful and folkloric additions that had been added over time to the body of zoological knowledge.

His systematic researches on Aristotelian lines were collected in De differentiis animalium libri decem, published in Paris in 1552. Wotton was also partly responsible for Insectorum, sive, Minimorum animalium theatrum or Theatre of Insects, although this was not published (as edited by Thomas Muffet) until 1634.

By favour of bishop Fox, he was made socius compar of Corpus Christi College, Oxford, with leave to travel into Italy for three years. He attended Padua, applied himself to physic, and took the degree of doctor. He was admitted a fellow of the College of Physicians 8 February 1528. He does not appear, as often stated, to have been physician to Henry VIII, but did serve the Duke of Norfolk and Margaret Pole, Countess of Salisbury. He was a fellow censor with Alban Hill in 1555.
