= Sachsia =

Sachsia may refer to:

- Sachsia (fungus) Bay 1894, a genus of fungi in the phylum Ascomycota
- Sachsia (nematode) Meyl 1960, a genus of nematodes in the family Diplogasteridae
- Sachsia (plant) Griseb. 1866, a genus of plants in the family Asteraceae
