= Fritz Noll =

German botanist (1858-1908)

Fritz Noll (27 August 1858 in Frankfurt am Main – 19 June 1908) was a German botanist who made contributions in the field of plant physiology.

He studied natural history and sciences at the Universities of Würzburg, Marburg and Heidelberg. In 1887 he became an assistant to Julius von Sachs at the University of Würzburg, and during the same year received his habilitation. In 1889 he was appointed etatsmäßiger professor at the agricultural academy at Poppelsdorf, as well as an associate professor at the University of Bonn. In 1907 he became a professor of botany at the University of Halle.

He is known for being the first to identify the phenomenon of parthenocarpy and coin the term.

== Published works ==
With Eduard Strasburger, Heinrich Schenck and Andreas Franz Wilhelm Schimper, he was co-author of "Lehrbuch der Botanik für Hochschulen", a book that was later translated into English with the title of "A Text-book of Botany" (1898).

Other noted works by Noll include:

- Experimentelle Untersuchungen über das Wachstum der Zellmembran, 1887 - Experimental research on the growth of the cell membrane.
- Über heterogene Induktion; Versuch eines Beitrags zur Kenntnis der Reizerscheinungen der Pflanzen, 1892 - On heterogeneous induction, etc.
- Das Sinnesleben der Pflanzen, 1896 - The "mental life" of plants
- Julius von Sachs : ein Nachruf, 1897 - Obituary of Julius von Sachs
- Ueber Geotropismus, 1900 - On geotropism
- Über das Etiolement der Pflanzen, 1901 - On etiolation of plants
- Zur Keimungs-Physiologie der Cucurbitaceen, 1901 - Germination-physiology of Cucurbitaceae.
- Zur Controverse über den Geotropismus, 1902 - Controversy concerning geotropism
- "Fruchtbildung ohne vorausgegangene Bestaubung (Parthenokarpie) bei der Gurke". Gesellschaft für Natur- und Heilkunde zu Bonn. 1; 1902: 149–162.
- Beobachtungen und Betrachtungen über embryonale Substanz, 1903 - Observations and considerations on embryonic substance.
- "Algae and related subjects - collected works", translated into English in 1893.
