= History of Botany (1530–1860) =

Book by Julius von Sachs

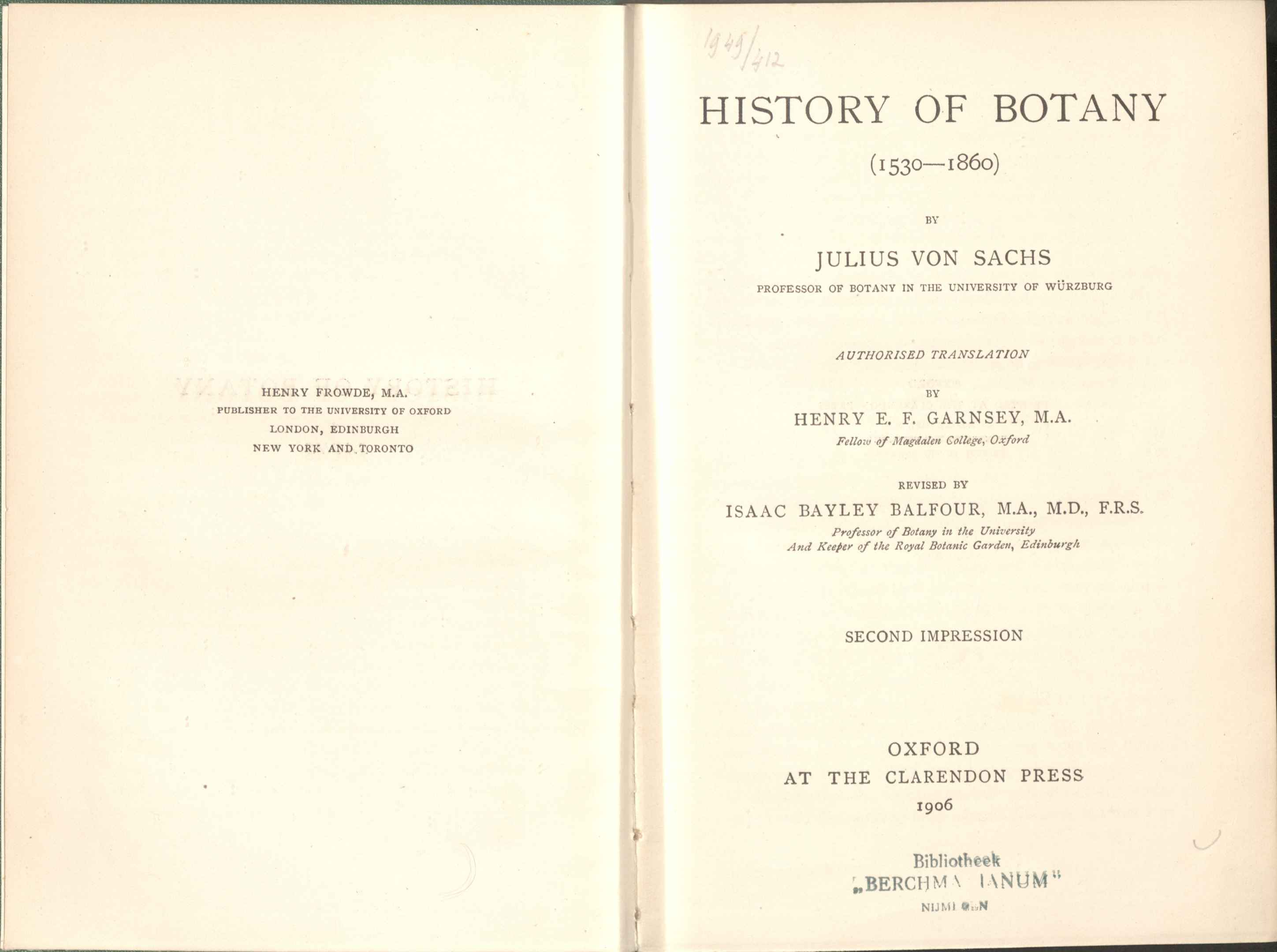
- Author: Julius von Sachs
- Language: German; English
- Published: 1875
- English publication date: 1890

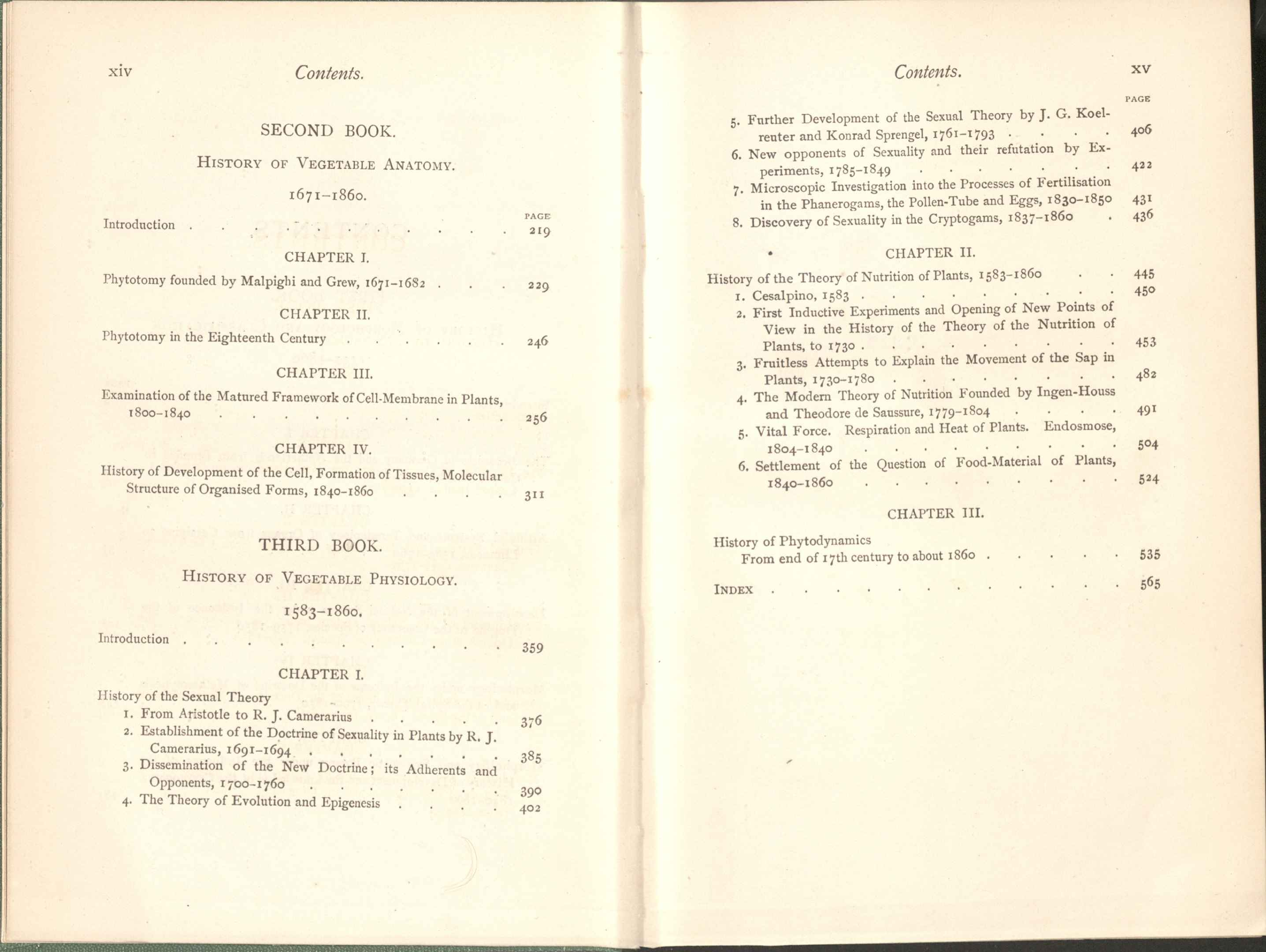
Contents page of the book

History of Botany (1530–1860) (differs in German: Geschichte der Botanik vom 16. Jahrhundert bis 1860) is a book about the historical evolution of botany, originally published in German by prominent German botanist Julius von Sachs in 1875. The authorized translation was published by Henry E. F. Garnsey and was revised by Scottish botanist Isaac Bayley Balfour in 1890. This book quickly became a standard work on the evolution of botany as a scientific field, used by contemporary peers and is still being used by modern scientists into the beginning of the 21st century. The book describes the history of morphology and classification of plants (for the years 1530–1860), the history of vegetable anatomy (years 1671–1860) and vegetable physiology (years 1583–1860). This book is one of the firsts describing the history of botany and considered among the best books on the subject.

== Context ==
In 1851–1856, the author attended the University of Prague. During these years he participated in scientific research positions such as microscope and plant physiology assistant as well as natural science illustrator. Von Sachs did not enjoy the biology department, however he was very interested in zoology and botany. Von Sachs was especially influenced by his philosophy course and professor, Robert von Zimmerman.

In 1859, he was appointed assistant in plant physiology at the Agriculture College and Forest Academy in Tharandt where he started to write Handbuch der Experimentalphysiologie des Pflanzen. In 1861 became a professor at the Agricultural College of Poppelsdorf, later the University of Bonn. During this time he published research such as Handbuch der Experimentalphysiologie des Pflanzen in 1865 which discussed plant physiology. In 1867, Von Sachs became chair of botany at the University of Freiburg but moved to the University of Würzburg the following year. The book Handbook of Botany, published in 1868 was very influential in the botanical community, it summarizes the botanical knowledge of the time.

In 1875, History of Botany was written to promote the development of science by commenting on methods and theories of the time. The book makes a historical overview of botanical research, theories and discoveries, which was not believed to have been done before. Von Sachs believed it to be the first history of botany. The book makes a picture of the beginning of the scientific study of vegetation in the 16th century with the societal culture at the time until 1860, a decade before the start of this book.

== Contents ==
The book is divided into three parts that the author calls books, which cover different time periods, ranging between the 1530s and the 1860s. The author had the goal to make a picture of the beginning of the scientific study of vegetation in the 16th century until the 1860s, a decade before the publication of this book.

The book presented different works of classification based on physiology, phytonomy and morphology done by botanists such as Andrea Caesalpino (1516–1603), Otto Brunfels (1488–1534), Leonhart Fuchs (1501–1566), Hieronymus Bock (1497/98–1554), Matthias de l’Obel (1538–1616), Gaspard Bauhin (1541–1613), Charles Darwin (1809–1882), Karl Nageli (1817–1891), Hugo von Mohl (1805–1872), and others.

The first book, History of Morphology and Classification, discusses the work of botanists since Brunfels to Caspar Bauhin, as well as metamorphosis and the spiral theory, and the terminology of botany used which distinguishes between Cesalpino's time to Linnaeus from 1583 to 1760.

The second book, History of Vegetable Anatomy, covers the time period of 1671 to 1860. It includes phytotomy and discusses the work of its founders Malpighi and Grew, and the studies of cells and their formation. This book included figures such as Malpighi and Grew, the founders of phytotomy and also touches upon phytotomy within the 18th century.

The third book, History of Vegetable Physiology, covers a time frame from 1583 to 1860, including topics such as the theory of evolution, the theory of plant nutrition and how the theory had developed from its founding up to 1804, as well as the history of phytodynamics.

== Translation ==
After the publication of the book in German in 1875, an authorized translation to English was published by Henry E. F. Garnsey in 1890, revised by Scottish botanist Isaac Bayley Balfour, for what Von Sachs wrote the preface dedicated to the translator of his book. In this preface he talks about his changed opinions due to new research being published after 1875. He admits to have made some modifications to his book, but he declares not having made too many drastic modifications in order to respect the original meaning of the book in accordance with its historical context.

== Reception ==
Von Sachs had a high reputation in the field of botany and History of Botany was regarded as a work worthy of serious study by botany scholars. A review of the book by the journal the American Naturalist congratulates the German Royal Academy of Sciences for selecting Sachs as the author of the book on the botanical history by stating: “Germans may, however, well be proud of the large and honorable share which their country men are here shown to have taken in the advancement of the science, and they may congratulate themselves upon the selection of an historian who has not ignored the claims of other nations”.

In 1909, J. Reynolds Green published the book "A History of Botany 1860–1900; Being a Continuation of Sachs History of botany, 1530–1860" carrying on Sachs's work with regards to the end of the 19th century. In honor of the 100th anniversary of Sachs's birth in 1932, the President of the Linnean Society of London, F. E. Weiss commemorated Sachs as being the author of the best “History of Botany” that they had at the time. In 1909, J. Reynolds Green published the book "A History of Botany 1860–1900; Being a Continuation of Sachs History of botany, 1530–1860" carrying on Sachs's work with regards to the end of the 19th century. In honor of the 100th anniversary of Sachs's birth in 1932, the President of the Linnean Society of London, F. E. Weiss commemorated Sachs as being the author of the best “History of Botany” that they had at the time.

Some late historians of science harshly criticized Sachs's History of Botany pointing out historical inaccuracies in his book. Marshall A. Howe dislikes the predominantly German focus of the book and E. L. Greene wrote: “Julius von Sachs, the last in the line, copied Sprengel’s caption The German Fathers, etc., but knew next to nothing of their works, even rating as unimportant Valerius Cordus, who was immeasurably the greatest of them all.”

E. L. Greene also accuses Sachs of discarding the role of Dioscorides as one of the firsts to recognize natural families of plants by stating that: “it is propagating fable in place of history to affirm that natural families were first recognized and indicated by any Linnaeus, or Adanson, or Jussieu of the eighteenth century”.

R.J. Harvey-Gibson spends several words in the introduction of his “Outlines of the History of Botany” (1919) criticizing Sachs for neglecting the pre-sixteenth century history of botany. Charles Singer defends Sachs by pointing out that the author "frankly" called his book "History of Botany (1530–1860)" with 1530 indicating what Sachs saw as the date during which modern botany was founded thanks to the work of the German botanists Brunfels, Fuchs, and Bock. Harvey-Gibson uses this claim to blame Sachs for overlooking the importance of men like Theophrastus, Tournefort and Haller in the history of botany, preferring the “dull crabbed phraseology of the German herbalists of the sixteenth century”.
