= Julius von Sachs =

German botanist (1832–1897)

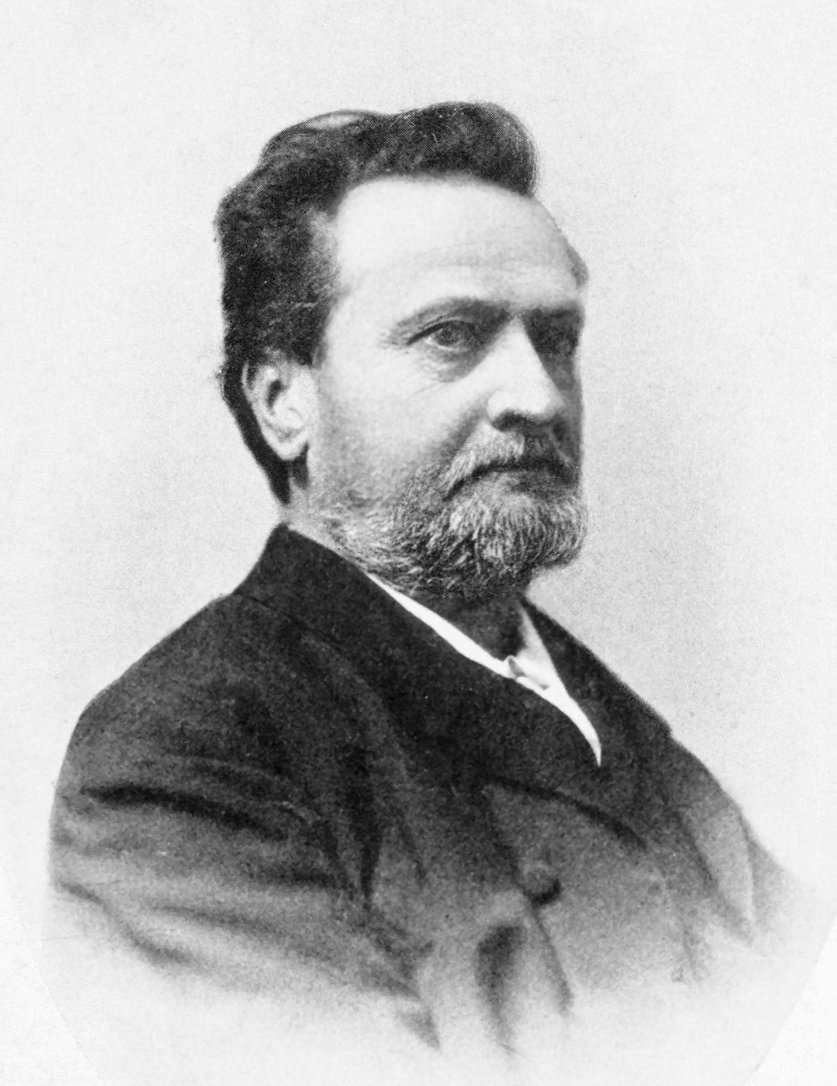
- Julius von Sachs
- Born: 2 October 1832; Breslau, Kingdom of Prussia (now Wrocław, Poland)
- Died: 29 May 1897 (aged 64); Würzburg, Kingdom of Bavaria
- Education: Charles University in Prague
- Known for: Sachs' solution Experimental Plant Physiology
- Scientific career
- Fields: Botany
- Workplaces: University of Bonn; University of Freiburg; University of Würzburg
- Author abbrev. (botany): Sachs

Julius von Sachs (German: [zaks]; 2 October 1832 – 29 May 1897) was a German botanist from Breslau, Prussian Silesia. He is considered the founder of experimental plant physiology and co-founder of modern water culture. Julius von Sachs and Wilhelm Knop are monumental figures in the history of botany by first demonstrating the importance of water culture for the study of plant nutrition and modern plant physiology in the 19th century.

== Early life ==
Sachs was born at Breslau on 2 October 1832. His father, Christian Gottlieb Sachs, was an engraver by trade, and father taught son delineation and accuracy of line and color. From earliest boyhood Julius was fascinated with plants, making collections of them on many field excursions with his father. He gave much of his time between the ages of thirteen and sixteen to drawing and painting the flowers, fungi, and other specimens which he collected. At the Gymnasium from 1845 to 1850 he was most interested in the natural sciences, collecting skulls, writing a monograph on the crayfish. His natural science teacher, one Krober, showed a singular lack of foresight when he solemnly warned young Sachs against devoting himself to the natural sciences.

When he was sixteen years old, his father died, and in the next year both his mother and a brother died of cholera. Suddenly without financial support, he was fortunate to be taken into the family of Jan Evangelista Purkyně who had accepted a professorship at the University of Prague. Sachs was admitted to the university in 1851.

Sachs famously labored long hours in the laboratory for Purkyně, and then long hours for himself each day after his work in the laboratory was finished. After the lab, he could devote himself entirely to establishing how plants grow.

== Career ==
In 1856 Sachs graduated as doctor of philosophy, and then adopted a botanical career, establishing himself as Privatdozent for plant physiology. In 1859 he was appointed physiological assistant to the Agricultural Academy of Tharandt (now part of the Technical University of Dresden) at Julius Adolph Stöckhardt; and in 1862, he was called to be director of the Polytechnic at Chemnitz, but was almost immediately transferred to the Agricultural Academy at Poppelsdorf (now part of the University of Bonn), where he remained until 1867, when he was nominated professor of botany in the University of Freiburg.

In 1868 he accepted the chair of botany in the University of Würzburg, which he continued to occupy (in spite of calls from more prestigious German universities) until his death.

Sachs achieved distinction as an investigator, a writer and a teacher; his name will ever be especially associated with the great development of plant physiology which marked the latter half of the 19th century, though there is scarcely a branch of botany to which he did not materially contribute. His earlier papers, scattered through the volumes of botanical journals and of the publications of learned societies (a collected edition was published in 1892–93), are of great and varied interest. Prominent among them is the series of "Keimungsgeschichten," which laid the foundation of our knowledge of microchemical methods, as also of the morphological and physiological details of germination. Then there is his resuscitation of the method of "water culture", and the application of it to the investigation of the problems of nutrition.

Most important are his experiments, developing the concept of photosynthesis, that the starch-grains, found in leaf chloroplasts, depend on sunlight. A leaf that has been in sunlight, then bleached white and stained with iodine turns black, proving its starch content, whereas a leaf from the same plant that has been out of the sun will remain white. A demonstration of this experiment is shown in the second episode of BBC Four's "Botany: A Blooming History" presented by Timothy Walker.

Sachs' later papers were almost exclusively published in the three volumes of the Arbeiten des botanischen Instituts in Würzburg (1871–88). Among these are his investigation of the periodicity of growth in length, in connection with which he devised the self-registering auxanometer, by which he established the retarding influence of the highly refrangible rays of the spectrum on the rate of growth; his research on heliotropism and geotropism, in which he introduced the clinostat; his work on the structure and the arrangement of cells in growing-points; the elaborate experimental evidence upon which he based his "imbibition-theory" of the transpiration-current; his exhaustive study of the assimilatory activity of the green leaf; and other papers of interest.

Sachs' first published volume was the Handbuch der Experimentalphysiologie des Pflanzen (1865; French edition, 1868), which gives an admirable account of the state of knowledge in certain departments of the subject, and includes a great deal of original information. This was followed in 1868 by the first edition of his famous Lehrbuch der Botanik. It is a comprehensive work, giving a summary of the botanical science of the period, enriched with the results of many original investigations. The third edition was translated into French by Philippe Édouard Léon Van Tieghem in 1873, and into English by Alfred Bennett in 1875, and published by Oxford University Press. The fourth and last German edition was published in 1874, and also issued by Oxford in 1882.

The Lehrbuch was eventually superseded by the Vorlesungen uber Pflanzenphysiologie (1st edition, 1882; 2nd edition, 1887; Eng. ed., Oxford, 1887), a work more limited in scope, but covering more ground than its title would imply; it has not gained the general recognition accorded to the Lehrbuch. Finally, there is the Geschichte der Botanik (1875); an account of the development of the various branches of botanical science from the middle of the 16th century up to 1860, of which an English edition was published in 1890 by the Oxford Press.

A full account of Sachs' life and work was given by Professor Goebel, formerly his assistant, in Flora (1897), of which an English translation appeared in Science Progress for 1898. There is also an obituary notice of him in the Proc. Roy. Soc. vol. lxii.

He was elected to honorary membership of the Manchester Literary and Philosophical Society, in 1872, and in 1885 became foreign member of the Royal Netherlands Academy of Arts and Sciences.

== Evolution ==
Sachs has been described as a "post-Darwinian botanist" who "integrated the evolutionary theory into his morphological writings." He was originally supportive of Darwinism but in his late career became bitterly opposed to it, instead preferring non-Darwinian evolution.

== Influence ==
Many of Sachs' students including Julius Oscar Brefeld, Francis Darwin, Karl Ritter von Goebel, Georg Albrecht Klebs, Spiridon Miliarakis, Hermann Müller-Thurgau, Fritz Noll, Wilhelm Pfeffer, Karl Prantl, Christian Ernst Stahl, Hugo de Vries and Harry Marshall Ward later became famous botanists.

His scientific statements also influenced Dennis Robert Hoagland and Daniel Israel Arnon, who followed one of Sachs' principles in developing standard nutrient solutions, by quoting him as follows: "I mention the quantities (of chemicals) I am accustomed to use generally in water cultures, with the remark, however, that a somewhat wide margin may be permitted with respect to the quantities of the individual salts and the concentration of the whole solution – it does not matter if a little more or less of the one or the other salt is taken – if only the nutritive mixture is kept within certain limits as to quality and quantity, which are established by experience." Said principle, Sachs' solution and Knop's solution contributed significantly to the development of the famous Hoagland solution.

The standard botanical author abbreviation Sachs is applied to species he described.

In 1866, botanist Griseb. published Sachsia, which is a genus of West Indian and Floridian plants in the elecampane tribe. Then in 1895, botanist Paul Lindner published Sachsia, which is a genus of fungi in the Ascomycota phylum and Saccharomycetales order. Both were named in honour of Julius von Sachs.

== Publications ==
- 1859: Physiologische Untersuchungen über die Keimung der Schmikbohne (Phaseolus multiflorus)
- 1859: Ueber das abwechselnde Erbleichen und Dunkelwerden der Blätter bei wechselnder Beleuchtung
- 1862: Ueber das Vergeilen der Pflanzen
- 1863: Ueber den Einfluss des Tageslichtes auf die Neublidung unt Entfaltung verschiedener Pflanzenorgane
- 1865: Handbuch der Experimentalphysiologie der Pflanzen
- 1868: Lehrbuch der Botanik, 3rd edition 1873, 4th ed. 1874
- 1875: Die Geschichte der Botanik vom 16. Jahrhundert bis 1860 (Digital edition from 1875 by the University and State Library Düsseldorf)
- 1878: Ueber die Anordnung der Zellen in jüngsten Pflanzentheilen
- 1882: Die Vorlesungen über Pflanzenphysiologie
- 1892: Gesammelte Abhandlungen über Pflanzenphysiologie
- 1894: Mechanomorphosen und Phylogenie
- 1896: Phylogenetische Aphorismen und über innere Gestaltungsursachen oder Automorphosen

== Other sources ==
- Gimmler, Hartmut (2005). "The plant physiologist Julius von Sachs and the academic education of women". Würzbg. Medizinhist. Mitt. 24: 415–24. PMID 17153314.
- Harvey, R B (January 1929). "Julius von Sachs". Plant Physiol. 4 (1): 154.2–157. PMC 440044. PMID 16652596.

== Bibliography ==
- Sachs, Julius von (1875). Geschichte der Botanik vom 16. Jahrhundert bis 1860. Munich: Oldenbourg.
  - Sachs, Julius von (1890) [1875]. Geschichte der Botanik vom 16. Jahrhundert bis 1860 [History of botany (1530–1860)]. translated by Henry E. F. Garnsey, revised by Isaac Bayley Balfour. Oxford: Oxford University Press. doi:10.5962/bhl.title.30585., see also History of botany (1530-1860) at Google Books
