= Sachsia (fungus) =

Scientific classification
- Kingdom: Fungi
- Division: Ascomycota
- Class: incertae sedis
- Order: incertae sedis
- Family: incertae sedis
- Genus: Sachsia; Lindner

Type species
- Sachsia albicans Bay

Genus of fungi

Sachsia is a genus of fungi in the Ascomycota phylum and Saccharomycetales order. The relationship of this taxon to other taxa within the phylum is unknown (incertae sedis), and it has not yet been placed with certainty into any class, order, or family.

The genus was circumscribed by Paul Lindner in Mikroskop. Betriebsk. Gärung (Berlin) on page 153 in 1895.

The genus name of Sachsia is in honour of Ferdinand Gustav Julius von Sachs (1832–1897), who was a German botanist, Plant physiologist and botanical illustrator who taught at the Charles University, Prague.

== See also ==
- List of Ascomycota genera incertae sedis
