= John Gerard =

English botanist and author (1545–1612)

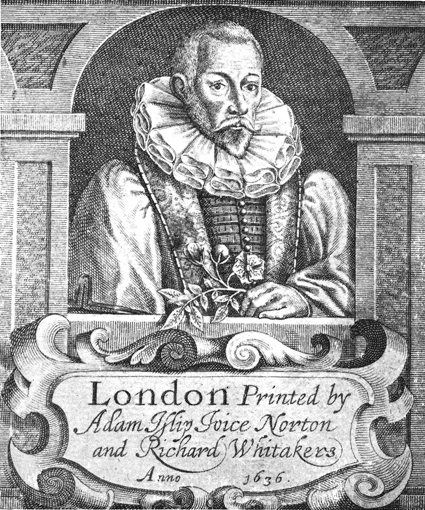
- Frontispiece of 1636 edition of Herball
- Born: 1545; Nantwich, Cheshire, England
- Died: 1612 (aged 66–67); London, England
- Resting place: St Andrews, Holborn
- Other name: John Gerarde
- Known for: The book Herball, or Generall Historie of Plantes
- Scientific career
- Fields: Botany
- Author abbrev. (botany): J.Gerard

John Gerard (also John Gerarde, 1545–1612) was an English herbalist with a large garden in Holborn, now part of London. His 1,484-page illustrated Herball, or Generall Historie of Plantes, first published in 1597, became a popular gardening and herbal book in English in the 17th century. Except for some added plants from his own garden and from North America, Gerard's Herbal is largely a plagiarised English translation of Rembert Dodoens' 1554 herbal, itself highly popular in Dutch, Latin, French and other English translations. Gerard's Herball drawings of plants and the printer's woodcuts are mainly derived from Continental European sources, but there is an original title page with a copperplate engraving by William Rogers. Two decades after Gerard's death, the book was corrected and expanded to about 1,700 pages.

== Life ==
=== Early life and education ===
Gerard was born at Nantwich, Cheshire, towards the end of 1545, receiving his only schooling at nearby Willaston, about two miles away. Nothing is known of his parentage, but the coat of arms on his Herball implies he was a member of the Gerards of Ince. Around the age of 17, in 1562, he became an apprentice to Alexander Mason (died 3 April 1574), a barber-surgeon of the Company of Barbers and Surgeons in London. Mason had a large surgical practice and had twice held the rank of Warden in the company, and later became Master. Gerard did well there, and was admitted to freedom of the company on 9 December 1569 and permitted to open his own practice. Although he claimed to have learned much about plants from travelling to other parts of the world (see for instance a letter to Lord Burghley in 1588), his actual travels appear to have been limited. In his later youth, he is said to have made one trip abroad, possibly as both a ship's surgeon and captain's lover on a merchant ship sailing around the North Sea and Baltic, for he refers to both Scandinavia and Russia in his writings.

=== Later life, family and death ===
Gerard married Anne (or possibly Agnes), who died in 1620, and by her had five children, of whom only one, Elizabeth, survived them. He spent his entire adult life in London, close to Barnards Inn, between Chancery Lane and Fetter Lane. It is thought he resided in a tenement with a garden belonging to Lord Burghley. After his death in February 1612, he was buried at St Andrews, Holborn on 18 February, but the grave is unmarked.

=== Career ===
Gerard had a successful career with the Barber–Surgeons' Company. He became a member of the Court of Assistants (board of directors) on 19 June 1595, despite being accused of defaming the wife of a colleague in 1578. He was made an examiner of candidates for admission to the freedom of the company on 15 January 1598 and Junior Warden in August 1597, under the mastership of George Baker. (Note: Officers of the company were elected every year, with a Master and three Wardens, ranked from Senior to Junior.) Following a further dispute with a senior warden, he relinquished his positions of "second warden and upper governor" on 26 September 1605, but this was resolved and on 17 August 1607 he was elected Master of the company. In the Annals of the company, published in 1890, a biography of Gerard appears under a list of "Eminent Members".

While studying he developed the tenement garden in Holborn, which he refers to frequently in his work. Later, he published a catalogue of the flowers there. This became popular and he received gifts of seeds and plants from around the world. He also received offers to supervise the gardens of noblemen. In 1577, he began work as superintendent at the gardens of William Cecil, 1st Baron Burghley (Lord Burghley, the queen's Lord High Treasurer) at the Strand and Theobalds, Hertfordshire, a position he continued in for more than 20 years. In 1586, the College of Physicians established a physic garden with Gerard as curator, a position he held till 1604. In 1588, Burghley was Chancellor of the University of Cambridge and Gerard wrote to him commending himself as a suitable superintendent of the university botanic garden, writing "to signe for ye University of Cambridge for planting of gardens". Amongst his qualifications he wrote "by reason of his travaile into farre countries his great practise and long experience". There is no evidence for the travel claim and nothing seems to have come of his application. By 1595, when he was appointed to the Court of Assistants, he had built up a reputation as a skilled herbalist and spent much time commuting from the Court to the garden he founded close to his cottage in Holborn, and also attending to his duties for Burghley. In 1596 he requested that the Barber–Surgeons' Company establish a physic garden ("Mr. Gerrard's garden") in East Smithfield, but this was not done. It was reported that Queen Elizabeth held his achievements in high regard. In October 1603, Gerard was granted a lease on a garden adjoining Somerset House, by Anne of Denmark, the queen consort to King James I, in which he was described as "surgeon and herbarist to the King". He relinquished the lease to Robert Cecil, Earl of Salisbury.

According to Anna Pavord, Gerard was a doer and not a scholar. Deborah Harkness notes that Gerard was not part of the community of Lime Street naturalists in London at the time. (Note: The Lime Street Naturalists were a group of naturalists, including plant enthusiasts and apothecaries, living in the vicinity of Lime Street, who exchanged correspondence amongst themselves and between themselves and like-minded naturalists across Europe.) His flawed (from the perspective of some of his contemporaries) Herball is dedicated to Burghley. He surrounded himself with influential friends and contacts, including Lancelot Browne, George Baker, and the apothecaries James Garrett, Hugh Morgan and Richard Garth. Garret was a Huguenot living and working in London, and a neighbour of the Flemish botanist Matthias de l'Obel (also known as Lobelius). Many of these had fine gardens and would exchange plants. Garth, who described Gerard as "a worshipful gentleman and one that greatly delighteth in strange plants" had South American contacts from where he would import rarities. He also exchanged plants with Clusius and cultivated a certain "Captain Nicholas Cleet of the Turky Company" from whom he obtained specimens from the Middle East. He would also visit other collectors and nurserymen such as Richard Pointer of Twickenham, Master Fowle, keeper of the queen's house at St. James and Master Huggens, keeper of the garden at Hampton Court. His servant, William Marshall travelled to the Mediterranean on his behalf and Jean Robin, the French king's gardener sent him seeds. After his death in February 1612 he was buried at the parish church of St Andrews, Holborn.

== Work ==
Illustrations from the Herball (1597)

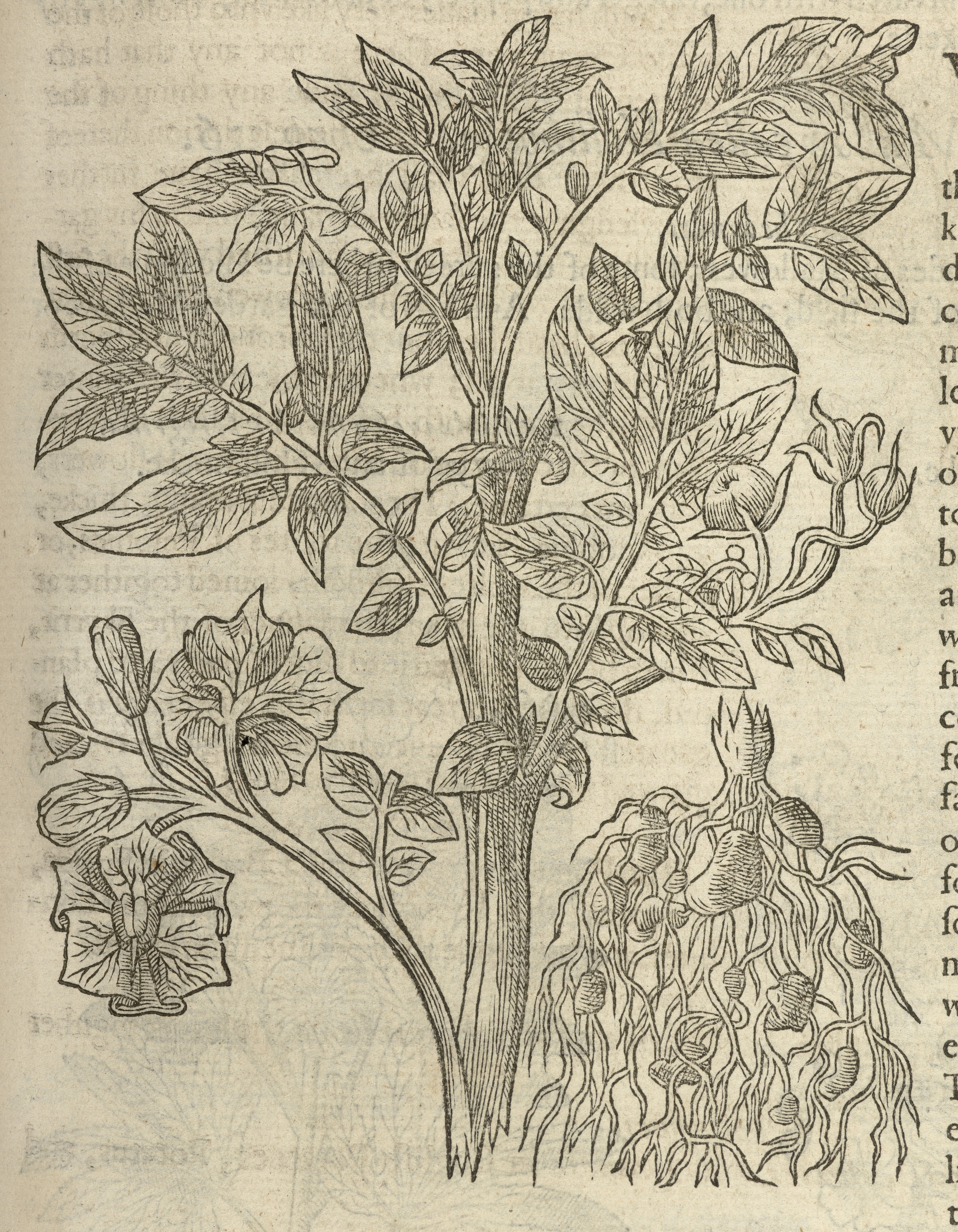
Virginia Potato

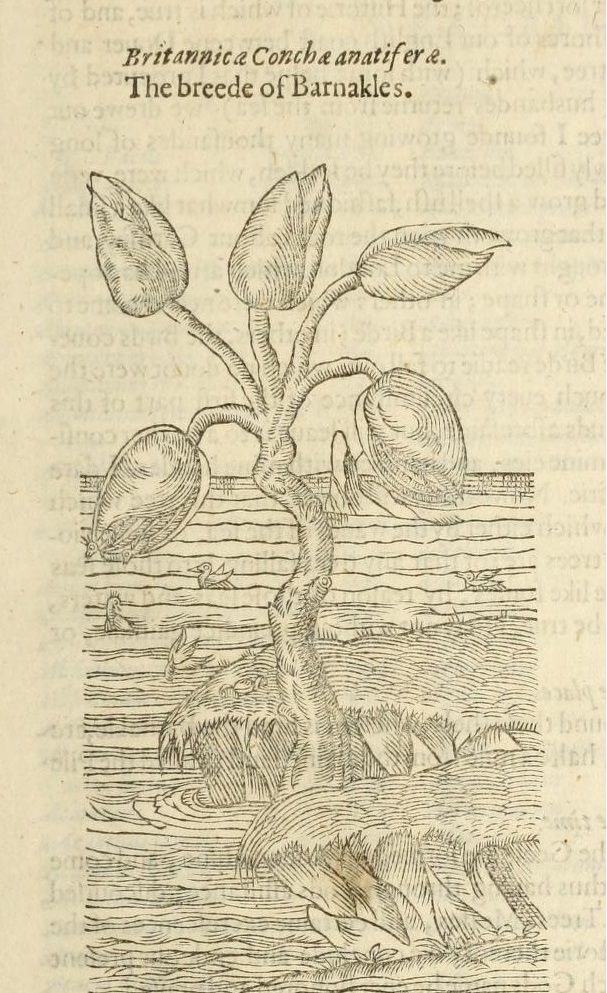
The Goose or Barnakle tree, that bears geese

=== Catalogue of Plants 1596 ===
Gerard's 1596 Catalogue (Catalogus arborum, fruticum, ac plantarum tam indigenarum, quam exoticarum, in horto Johannis Gerardi civis et chirurgi Londinensis nascentium) is a list of 1,039 rare plants he cultivated in his garden at Holborn, where he introduced exotic plants from the New World, including a plant he misidentified as Yucca. The Yucca failed to bloom in his lifetime, but a pip taken from the plant later bloomed for a contemporary. To this day Yucca bears the name Gerard gave it. The list was the first catalogue of this type ever produced. The only known copy is in the Sloane collection at the British Library. L'Obel wrote an introduction to the text. George Baker describes the garden in his preface to the Herball as "all manner of strange trees, herbes, rootes, plants, floures and other such rare things, that it would make a man wonder, how one of his degree, not having the purse of a number, could ever accomplish the same". A revised edition in 1599 by John Norton, the Queen's Printer, placed the English and Latin names in opposite columns.

=== Herball 1597 ===
The publisher and Queen's Printer John Norton proposed to Gerard an English translation of Dodoens' popular herbal, Stirpium historiae pemptades sex (1583). This was a Latin version of an earlier work in Flemish by Dodoens, his Cruydeboeck (Herb Book, 1554). It had been translated into English in 1578 by Henry Lyte as A Niewe Herball and proved popular. Gerard was not Norton's first choice, the translation having originally been commissioned from Dr Robert Priest, (Note: Presumably Dr Robert Preest (c. 1549–1596)) a member of the London College of Physicians, who had meanwhile died. Although Gerard acknowledges Priest's role, he implies that he died before starting the work. As curator of the College garden, he would have been familiar with Priest and his work. The completed book appears to include much of Priest's work, with his own completion of the text in the form of annotations from his own garden, and for the first time, some North American plants. An example is the first English description of the potato, which he mistakenly believed came from Virginia, not South America (see illustration). He then incorporated some unpublished material from L'Obel and material from the work of Clusius, which he rearranged to follow more closely L'Obel's scheme of his 1570 Stirpium adversaria nova. It is thought to be a disguise for the original source.

In the preface ("To the courteous and well-willing Readers"), Gerard acknowledged Priest's efforts, but claimed the work was his own;

"and since that Doctor Priest, one of our London Colledge, hath (as I heard) translated the last edition of Dodonaeus, which meant to publish the same; but being prevented by death, his translation likewise perished: lastly, my selfe one of the least among many, have presumed to set foorth unto the view of the world, the first fruits of these mine own labours"

This led to Gerard being accused of plagiarism, and even of being a "crook". The work, published in 1597, was his Great Herball, or, Generall Historie of Plantes. This edition reused hundreds of woodblocks from Jacobus Theodorus Tabernaemontanus' Kräuterbuch or Eicones Plantarum seu stirpium (Frankfurt, 1590), which themselves had been reused from earlier 16th-century botanical books by Pietro Andrea Mattioli, Rembert Dodoens, Carolus Clusius, and L'Obel. Gerard's lack of scientific training and knowledge led him to frequent inclusion of material that was incorrect, folkloric or mythical, such as the barnacle tree that bore geese (see illustration). Nevertheless, the work, including over 1,000 plants in 167 chapters remained popular, providing in English information about the names, habits and uses ("vertues") of many plants known and rare. It was seen as the best and most exhaustive work of its kind and a standard reference for some time.

==== Publication controversy ====
Modern authorities disagree on how much of Gerard's Herball was original. Garret made a chance visit to the Norton publishing shop, where he discovered the proofs of the Herball and alerted the Nortons both to errors he discovered in the proofs and the incorporation of some of L'Obel's material. This is recounted by L'Obel in his Stirpium illustrationes (1655), which accuses Gerard of plagiarism. Although the Norton firm was not concerned about plagiarism, it feared errors in a book that was supposed to be an expert reference guide. It hired L'Obel as an internationally recognised expert on plants, who as Gerard's friend had unwittingly contributed to his book, to proof the translations, fix the mismatched illustrations and right the textual wrongs. When Gerard discovered L'Obel's thankless efforts, he had him dismissed. Although Gerard was an experienced collector and plantsman, he lacked L'Obel's scholarship, as is clear in his dedication to Burghley, where he presents himself as a gardener. Gerard dismissed L'Obel's criticisms as being due to unfamiliarity with English idioms.

Norton decided to proceed with publication despite these difficulties. He decided against using Dodoens' original illustrations since this would have revealed the actual source of the material, but instead rented woodblocks from Nicolaus Bassaeus in Frankfurt, about 1,800 in all, only 16 being original. However, Gerard was then faced with the difficulty of matching them to the text and frequently mislabelled them.

== Selected publications ==
- Gerard, John (1876) [1596]. Jackson, Benjamin Daydon (ed.). A catalogue of plants cultivated in the garden of John Gerard, in the years 1596–1599/edited with notes, references to Gerard's Herball, the addition of modern names, and a life of the author, by Benjamin Daydon Jackson. London. (2nd edition 1599)
- Gerard, John (1597). The Herball or Generall Historie of Plantes (1st ed.). London: John Norton. (Internet Archive version: also here at Botanicus and here at Biodiversity Heritage Library)
  - Index p. 1392
- Gerard, John (2015) [1633]. Johnson, Thomas (ed.). The Herbal Or General History of Plants. Originally published by Adam Islip, Joice Norton and Richard Whitakers in London (2nd ed.). NY: Dover. ISBN 9781606600801.
  - Index p. 1633
- Gerard, John (1636) [1597]. Johnson, Thomas (ed.). The Herball, or Generall Historie of Plantes, gathered by John Gerarde, Master in Chirurgerie. Very much enlarged and amended by Thomas Johnson, Citizen and Apothecarye (3rd ed.). London: Adam Islip, Joice Norton and Richard Whitakers.
  - Index p. 1678

== Legacy ==
After Gerard's death in 1612, an enlarged, revised and corrected edition of the Herball appeared in 1633 and as a third edition in 1636. These were edited by Thomas Johnson, a London apothecary and botanist, commissioned by the heirs to the estate of John Gerard. Johnson's edition contained many corrections and new empirical observations. He added over 800 new species and 700 figures. Through anecdotal comments, Johnson carefully distanced himself from the original. For example, he wrote of the entry on the saffron crocus, "Our author in this chapter was of many minds." The plant drawings in the 1633 and 1636 editions used hundreds of woodblocks originally made for an edition of Rembert Dodoens's original herbal, the basis of Gerard's work. These were shipped from Antwerp to London. Johnson's revisions are the best-known versions, which most later authors refer to, sometimes called Gerard emaculatus (Note: Also Gerardus Emaculatus and Ger. emac.) ("Gerard freed from blemishes"). Long ascribed this term to John Ray, but it is thought to have been used earlier by John Goodyer and others.

Gerard may be seen as one of the founders of botany in the English language, despite being ill-educated was more interested as a herbalist and barber-surgeon in the medicinal properties of plants than in botanical theory. His botanical shortcomings were ascribed by critics in his own time, including John Ray, who commented that despite the fact that the book was the standard botany text in the 17th century, it was by an ignorant man whose lack of foreign languages meant he could not have translated the work. Because it was a practical and useful book, packed with helpful drawings of plants, and because Gerard had a fluid and lively writing manner, his Herball was popular with ordinary literate people in 17th-century England. Although scholars at the time recognised that it was a pirated work with many limitations, there is evidence of the book remaining in practical use as a medicinal herbal even in the early 19th century. Agnes Arber notes how a man born in 1842 recounts that in his childhood there was still a woman who used the Herball for treating the ailments of her neighbours.

Despite some shortcomings in Gerard's effort, Linnaeus honoured him in the name of the plant species Gerardia. Gerard's Herball references many of the poisonous plants mentioned in Shakespeare's plays. Additional value has been placed on the Herball by students of literature. For example, the herb which produces the deathlike sleep of Juliet or Cymbeline may refer to nightshade, Mandragora or Doronicum, all listed and described in the Herball. The writer Mark Griffiths has claimed that the drawing of a man on the title page of the Herball depicts Shakespeare, but other scholars dispute this.

The art of describing the natural world by direct observation divides Renaissance natural historians from their medieval predecessors, who were largely uncritical adherents of ancient texts. The earliest printed works in Renaissance natural history fell into two categories: 1. newly recovered, translated and corrected editions of ancient texts, and 2. herbals based on empirical knowledge of early botanists. Although Francis Bacon advocated inductive thinking based on observation or description (empiricism) as the way to understand and report on the natural world, the early Renaissance printed herbals were slightly modified adaptations of works by their medieval predecessors. These somewhat unscientific early scientists generally contented themselves with listing plants and occasionally other things like animals and minerals and noting their medical uses.

John Gerard worked within the early wave of Renaissance natural historians, who sought to systematise natural history while retaining the works of the ancients. The basis for Gerard's Herball and those of Dodoens and other herbalists was De Materia Medica of Dioscorides, an early Greek writer whose work was seen a definitive text, coupled with works by Gerard's contemporaries, the German botanists Leonard Fuchs, after whom Fuchsia is named, and L'Obel after whom Lobelia is named. Both Fuchs and L'Obel were early botanists who worked empirically with plants. They were well educated, as were other members of the "Lime Street community" in the City of London. Gerard and L'Obel were friends who made occasional field trips together.

The South African native botanical plant genus of Gerardiina was named after Gerard in 1897.

== Bibliography ==
=== Books and articles ===
- Arber, Agnes (1938) [1912 (reissue 1953)]. Herbals: their origin and evolution. A chapter in the history of botany, 1470–1670 (2nd ed.). Cambridge University Press. ISBN 9781108016711.
- Barlow, HM (15 March 1913a). "English herbals". British Medical Journal. 1 (2724): 557–558. doi:10.1136/bmj.1.2724.555. JSTOR 25300748. S2CID 220018269.
- Barlow, Horace Mallinson (1913b). "Old English herbals 1525–1640". Proceedings of the Royal Society of Medicine. 6 (Sect Hist Med). London: John Bale, Sons & Danielsson: 108–149. doi:10.1177/003591571300601512. PMC 2006232. PMID 19977241.
- Brown, Mark (19 May 2015). "Shakespeare: writer claims discovery of only portrait made during his lifetime". The Guardian. Archived from the original on 22 April 2016.
- Boulger, George Simonds (1892). "Johnson, Thomas (d.1644)" . In Lee, Sidney (ed.). Dictionary of National Biography. Vol. 30. London: Smith, Elder & Co.
- Dodonaei, Remberti (1583) [1554]. Stirpium historiae pemptades sex, sive libri XXX [Crvyd-boeck] (in Latin). Antwerp: Plantini. Archived from the original on 7 November 2017.
- Harkness, Deborah E. (2007). The Jewel house of art and nature: Elizabethan London and the social foundations of the scientific revolution. New Haven: Yale University Press. ISBN 9780300111965. (see also The Jewel House)
- Hoeniger, F.D.; Hoeniger, J.F.M. (1969). The Growth of Natural History in Stuart England: From Gerard to the Royal Society. Charlottesville: Folger Books. ISBN 978-0-918016-14-0.
- Jackson, Benjamin Daydon (1890). "Gerard, John (1545-1612)" . In Stephen, Leslie (ed.). Dictionary of National Biography. Vol. 21. London: Smith, Elder & Co.
- Gunther, Robert Theodore (1922). Early British botanists and their gardens, based on unpublished writings of Goodyer, Tradescant, and others. Oxford University Press.
- Lankester, Edwin, ed. (1848). The Correspondence of John Ray: Consisting of Selections from the Philosophical Letters Published by Dr. Derham, and Original Letters of John Ray in the Collection of the British Museum. London: Ray Society. (also here at Biodiversity Heritage Library)
- l'Obel, Matthias de (1571). Stirpium adversaria nova. London: Thomae Purfoetii. Archived from the original on 9 November 2020.
- de l'Obel, Matthias (1655). Botanographic Regii eximii Stirpium illustrationes: plurimas elaborantes inauditas plantas, subreptitiis Joh: Parkinsoni rapsodiis (ex codice MS insalutato) sparsim gravatae. Ejusdem adjecta sunt ad calcem Theatri botanici Auaptnuala, Accurante Guil: How, Anglo (in Latin). London: Tho. Warren. Archived from the original on 1 December 2017.
- Ogilvie, Brian W. (2006). The Science of Describing: Natural History in Renaissance Europe. Chicago: University of Chicago Press. ISBN 9780226620862.
- Pavord, Anna (2005). The naming of names the search for order in the world of plants. New York: Bloomsbury. ISBN 9781596919655.
- Raven, Charles E. (1950) [1942]. John Ray, naturalist: his life and works (2nd ed.). Cambridge [England]: Cambridge University Press. ISBN 9780521310833. Archived from the original on 19 February 2024.
- Raven, Charles E. (1947). English naturalists from Neckham to Ray: a study of the making if the modern world. Cambridge: Cambridge University Press. ISBN 9781108016346.
- Smolenaars, Marja (2008). "Gerard, John". Oxford Dictionary of National Biography (online ed.). Oxford University Press. doi:10.1093/ref:odnb/10555. (Subscription, Wikipedia Library access or UK public library membership required.)
- Vande Walle, W.F., ed. (2001). Dodonæus in Japan: translation and the scientific mind in the Tokugawa period. Leuven: Leuven University Press. ISBN 9789058671790.
- Tabor, Edward (1 January 1970). "Plant Poisons in Shakespeare". Economic Botany. 24 (1): 81–94. doi:10.1007/bf02860641. JSTOR 4253115. S2CID 36759773.
- Thompson, Roger (July 1974). "Some newly discovered letters of John Ray". Journal of the Society for the Bibliography of Natural History. 7 (1): 111–123. doi:10.3366/jsbnh.1974.7.1.111.
- Walters, S.M. (1981). The shaping of Cambridge botany: a short history of whole-plant botany in Cambridge from the time of Ray into the present century. Cambridge University Press. ISBN 9780521237956.
- Young, Sidney (1890). The annals of the barber-surgeons of London. London: Blades, East & Blades.

=== Encyclopaedias ===
- Encyclopædia Britannica. "John Gerard: English herbalist and author". Archived from the original on 8 March 2022.
- Chisholm, Hugh, ed. (1911). "Gerard, John" . Encyclopædia Britannica. Vol. 11 (11th ed.). Cambridge University Press.
- Grout, James (2016). "John Gerard". Encyclopaedia Romana. University of Chicago. Archived from the original on 19 February 2024.
- Penny Cyclopedia (1828–1843). The Penny Cyclopaedia of the Society for the Diffusion of Useful Knowledge. London: Charles Knight.
  - Penny Cyclopaedia vol. V Blois–Buffalo. 1836., in Penny Cyclopedia (1828–1843)

=== Websites ===
- "Herball, Generall Historie of Plants by John Gerard, 1597: Introduction of North American plants into European herbals". Historical exhibits: What is an herb?. Claude Moore Health Sciences Library, University of Virginia. 2007. Archived from the original on 3 June 2020.
- RCP (2009). "Robert Preest". RCP Munks Roll: Lives of the Fellows vol. 1 (1518–1700) p. 98. Royal College of Physicians of London. Archived from the original on 2 February 2017.
- BHO (2004). "Preest, Robert". British History Online: Physicians and Irregular Medical Practitioners in London 1550–1640 Database. Institute of Historical Research. Archived from the original on 4 November 2016.
