= Matthias de l'Obel =

Flemish physician and botanist (1538–1616)

Mathias de l'Obel
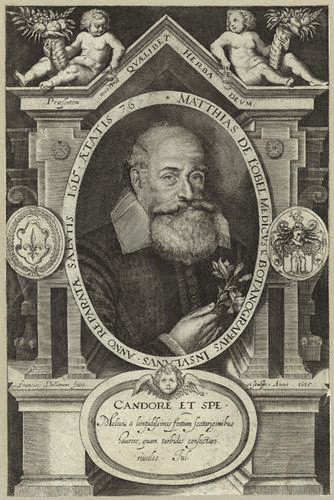
- Engraving by Francis Delaram, 1615
- Born: 1538; Lille
- Died: 3 March 1616 (aged 77–78); Highgate, England
- Resting place: St Denis, Highgate
- Education: University of Leuven; University of Montpellier
- Known for: Herbal
- Children: 2
- Scientific career
- Fields: Medicine, botany
- Workplaces: Antwerp, Delft, Middelburg, London
- Author abbrev. (botany): Lobel

Mathias de l'Obel, Mathias de Lobel or Matthaeus Lobelius (1538 – 3 March 1616) was a Flemish physician and botanist who was born in Lille, Flanders, in what is now Hauts-de-France, France, and died at Highgate, London, England. He studied at the University of Montpellier and practiced medicine in the Low Countries and England, including positions as personal physicians to two monarchs. A member of the sixteenth-century Flemish School of Botany, he wrote a series of major treatises on plants in both Latin and Dutch. He was the first botanist to appreciate the distinction between monocotyledons and dicotyledons. The plant genus Lobelia is named after him, as is Lobel's maple Acer lobelii.

== Life ==
Mathias de l'Obel was born in Lille (Flemish Rijsel) in the County of Flanders, Spanish Netherlands, now French Flanders in 1538, the son of Jean De l'Obel, a lawyer whose practice specialized in aristocrats in the army. Relatively little is known about his life. By the age of sixteen he had already developed an interest in both botany and medicine. He spent some time traveling and studying in Italy in 1551 and 1563–1564 before studying medicine in Leuven and at Montpellier in France. He sought out Montpellier due to the reputation of Guillaume Rondelet, as had his earlier contemporary, Carolus Clusius. It is said that l'Obel was Rondelet's favourite pupil, and on his death in 1566 l'Obel inherited all his manuscripts. His botanical field work was under the supervision of Rondelet's son-in-law, Jacques Salomon d'Assas. He matriculated at the University of Montpellier on 22 May 1565, at the age of twenty-seven. He remained in Montpellier for a further two years, furthering his studies, including botanical expeditions in the Languedoc region.

From 1566–1571, for about four years, he traveled and then he settled in Elizabethan England for about four years (1566–1571), together with his fellow student Pierre Pena (1535–1605), probably as a Protestant refugee. (Note: Some sources give different dates, such as 1568–1572, and also vary as to his religious affiliation) He lived on Lime Street, London in an area containing many Protestant refugees from the continent ("come for religion"), among fellow Flemings, like James Garrett the apothecary. There he also came to know the English botanist, John Gerard. He and Pena brought with them their botanical collection and carried out botanical exploration in England before returning to the Low Countries sometime between 1571 and 1574.

In 1596, age 58, L'Obel married Isabeau Laigniez (1576-1642) in Lille . Of their children, one daughter, Mary l'Obel, married Louis Le Myre (Ludovicus Myreus), who collaborated with him, the other, Anne l'Obel married John Wolfgang Rumler. Both sons-in-law, le Myre and Rumler were pharmacists, with good reputations in London society. He eventually moved permanently to England in 1596. Among the English botanists, his closest friend was Thomas Penny, whom he had first met in Montpellier, and to whom he pays tribute in his dedication of the Stirpium adversaria (1571). l'Obel died in Highgate in 1616 at the age of 78, and was buried in the chancel of St Dionis Backchurch.

L'Obel's coat of arms displayed on his books alludes to his name, with two poplar (abele) trees (French Aubel).

== Work ==
Following his studies in Montpellier, l'Obel set up a medical practice in England (1566–1571), living initially in London, and then in Somerset, near Bristol at the home of his patron, Edward St. Loe. There he was joined in botanical expeditions by Clusius. On his return to continental Europe, he practised in Antwerp (1571–1581) and then Delft (1581–1584). The period from 1571 to 1596, after his return from England, was one of the most productive in his life, with two major publications. Delft had been the residence of William, Prince of Orange (William the Silent) since 1572, and became the capital of the newly independent Netherlands in 1581. In Delft l'Obel served as personal physician (hofarts) to the Protestant Prince William. The exact date of this appointment is uncertain, but his Kruydtboeck (1581) is dedicated to the Prince, and the title page describes l'Obel as Medecijn der Princ. suggesting it was some time between returning to the Low Countries in 1571 and 1581. His name also appears on a list of court personnel dated 1578. William, however, was assassinated in 1584. Claims that after William's death, l'Obel was employed by the Estates General, the governing body of the Netherlands, have been disputed. Following the assassination l'Obel became a city physician in Middelburg, which was then a prosperous centre of trade and capital of the province of Zeeland. He was responsible for the establishment of a botanical herb garden there, and would have known Ambrosius Bosschaert (1573–1621), the artist, best known for his meticulous flower paintings, who was a member and eventually dean of the Saint Luke’s Guild in Middelburg.

In 1596 he moved from Middelburg, returning once more to England, becoming personal physician and botanicus regius (Botanist Royal) to King James I of England in 1607. From there he periodically returned to Middelburg for a visit. Amongst his responsibilities in England was as superintendent of the botanical garden of Lord Zouch in Hackney, a partnership brought about by Clusius. This was a physic garden and at the time, one of the few in existence in England. It became a gathering place for botanists, enabling l'Obel to become an important link between England and the continent. He also accompanied Lord Zouch on his posting as ambassador to Denmark in 1598, where he carried out botanical exploration. The latter was published in 1605 as an appendix to the second edition of Stirpium adversaria. It was through Zouch that he obtained the post of botanicus regius.

In 1597 he became involved in a controversy surrounding his friend John Gerard. In 1596 he had provided a preface to Gerard's Catalogus. (Note: Lobelius appears to have later retracted this preface, having written and signed haec esse falsissima (this is very false) on the copy now in London's Natural History Museum) The following year, Gerard was working on a translation of Dodoens's Stirpium historiae pemptades sex (1583), to be published by John Norton, the Queen's Printer. James Garrett, on a visit to the Norton's publishing house, saw the proofs and alerted Norton as to both errors and unattributed borrowings from Lobelius. Norton then hired Lobelius as an expert editor, but when Gerard discovered this, he had Lobelius dismissed, and had the work published under his own name as The Herball or Generall Historie of Plantes (1597). Lobelius provides an account of this in his Stirpium illustrationes (1655) in which he accuses Gerard of plagiarism.

He spent much of his life looking for a rational way to classify plants that could be tested by empiricism.

Ordo univeralis

Sic enim ordine, quo nihil pulchrius in coelo, aut in Sapientis animo
An order, than which nothing more beautiful exists in the heavens, or in the mind of a wise man

— l'Obel (1571), Operis argumentorum p. 2 (Note: Stirpium adversaria nova 1576: Proinde adversariorum voce novas veteribus additas plantas et novum ordinem quadantenus innuimus. Qui ordo utique sibi similis et unus progreditur ducitque a sensui propinquioribus et magis familiaribus ad ignotiora et compositiora modum que sive progressum similitudinis sequitur et familiaritatis quo et universim et particulatim quantum licuit per rerum varietatem et vastitatem sibi responderet. Sic enim ordine quo nihil pulchrius in coelo aut in sapientis animo quae longe lateque disparata sunt unum quasi fiunt magno verborum memoriae et cognitionis compendio ut Aristoteli et Theophrasto placet)

In the Stirpium of 1571, it is the form of the leaves and their venation that he favoured. In doing so he distinguished between grass-like plants with long straight parallel veins, while the majority had broad leaves with net-like venation. He was the first to recognise the fundamental difference between monocotyledons (grass-like) and dicotyledons, although he never suggested names to group these plants under.

=== Life and times ===
Lobelius has been described as the least well known of a group variously called the Ecole flamande de Botanique du XVIme siècle (16th century Flemish school of botany) or Flemish "Fathers of Botany", (Note: In contrast to the earlier “German fathers of botany”, Otto Brunfels, Jerome Bock and Leonhard Fuchs) which, in addition to Lobelius, included Carolus Clusius and Rembert Dodoens. Lobelius (Note: For English translation, see Swimberghe 1994, p. 208) and others have stated that the collection and cultivation of plants had been a preoccupation in the Southern Netherland (Flanders or Galliae Belgicae) since the crusades, and that Flemish gardens contained many rare plants, although these were destroyed in the civil wars of the sixteenth century, and he mentions many important growers such as Carolus de Croy, and his wife Marie de Brimeu, Joannes de Brancion and Joannes van der Dilf.

At the opening of the sixteenth century the general belief was that the plant world had been completely described by Dioscorides, in his De Materia Medica. During Lobelius' lifetime, botanical knowledge was undergoing enormous expansion, partly fueled by the expansion of the known plant world by New World exploration, the discovery of printing and the use of wood-block illustration. This period is thought of as a botanical Renaissance. Europe became engrossed with natural history from the 1530s, and gardening and cultivation of plants became a passion and prestigious pursuit from monarchs to universities. The first botanical gardens appeared as well as the first illustrated botanical encyclopaedias, together with thousands of watercolours and woodcuts. The experience of farmers, gardeners, foresters, apothecaries and physicians was being supplemented by the rise of the plant expert. Collecting became a discipline, specifically the Kunst- und Wunderkammern (cabinets of curiosities) outside of Italy and the study of naturalia became widespread through many social strata. The great botanists of the sixteenth century were all, like Lobelius, originally trained as physicians, who pursued a knowledge of plants not just for medicinal properties, but in their own right. Chairs in botany, within medical faculties were being established in European universities throughout the sixteenth century in reaction to this trend, and the scientific approach of observation, documentation and experimentation was being applied to the study of plants.

These were also turbulent times. Following the Protestant Reformation in the mid sixteenth century, and the subsequent Counter-Reformation there was much religious intolerance and persecution, while in the Netherlands the northern provinces started a rebellion against the governing Spaniards, the Eighty Years War (1568–1648). As a result many people fled or emigrated and many herbal and botanical gardens were destroyed. Lobelius stated that it was becoming increasingly difficult to live in his native Flanders.

== Publications ==
=== Stirpium adversaria nova (1570-71) ===
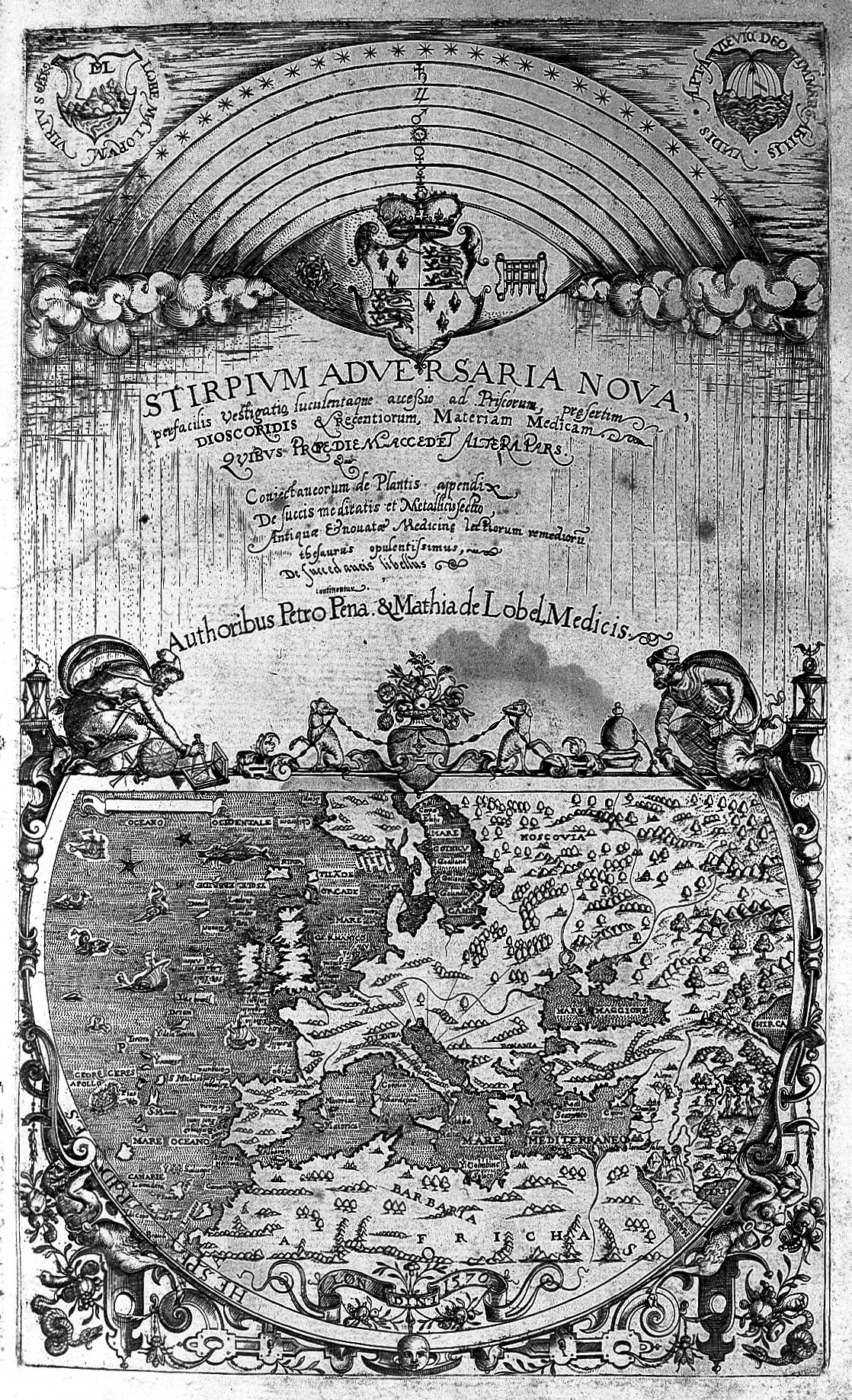
Title page, Stirpium adversaria nova 1571

Lobelius' first publication, Stirpium adversaria nova (1571) was written at the end of his stay in England, published in London and dedicated to Elizabeth I. It was written in collaboration with Pierre Pena (Petrus Pena), his fellow student and traveling companion from Provence, and was an important milestone in botanical history, placing emphasis on medicine and botany as sciences that must be based on thorough and exact observation. The extent of Pena's contribution is unknown, although his name appears first on the title page (see illustration). Like his contemporaries, l'Obel's interest in plants was driven by their pharmacological properties. The Stirpium was l'Obel's major botanical work and included information on about 1,200–1,300 plants that they had collected in the area around Montpellier, in the Cévennes, in the Low Countries, and in England, and included additional information on cultivation and the manufacture of plant products, such as beer. This was one of the earliest attempts to classify plants according to their natural affinities, rather than their medical uses. L'Obel based this on the form of their leaves. His concepts of genus and family formed the basis of later more definitive classifications such as that of Linnaeus, and some of his groupings have survived into modern times. Although it was eventually to be the work on which l'Obel's reputation would rest, based on the system of classification that he set out, at the time of its publication, it met with only moderate success and much criticism.

=== Plantarum seu stirpium historia (1576) ===
The Stirpium adversaria was followed five years later by Plantarum seu stirpium historia (1576). This was a two volume publication consisting of a new work, the Stirpium observationes together with a re-issue of the Stirpium adversaria, titled Nova stirpium adversaria as a companion piece, together with a treatise on herbal remedies by Rondelet and a multilingual index to the composite work. It included 1,486 engravings of plants, including those from works by Pietro Mattioli, Rembert Dodoens, and Charles de l’Écluse. In 1581 he produced his Kruydtboeck, a Dutch translation of the former work. This was well received and considered a milestone in plant systematics. Lobelius' hometown of Lille sent him a gift of 50 pounds in recognition of the importance of the work.

=== Late works ===
In 1605 he reissued the Stirpium, including in it an essay on the pharmacological studies of his mentor, Guillaume Rondelet, the Pharmacopoeia Rondelletii. At the time of his death in 1616, his Stirpium illustrationes was unpublished, and was not published till 1655 (in part) by William How. In the meantime, John Parkinson had used it in his Theatrum botanicum (1640).

=== Attributed works ===
A further publication, the Stirpium seu Plantarum Icones (1581) in the form of a Flora was for a long time attributed to l'Obel, despite his name not appearing anywhere in it or mentioning it in his correspondence, and is still sold and displayed in museums as one of his works. However, there is good evidence that this was a work produced by the well known Antwerp publisher Christophe Plantin for Severinus Gobelius, physician to the Duke of Prussia. Plantin had a large collection of wood-cuts, both produced in his workshop or purchased by him, with which he illustrated many of the major botanical publications of the time, which he assembled according to the classification used by Lobelius in his Kruydtboeck of the same year. This work was reissued in 1591 as Icones stirpium.

=== List of selected publications ===
see Stafleu & Cowan (1981), Arber (1986, p. 278), Johnston (1992), Mallet & Jovet (2008)

- l'Obel, Matthias de (1571). Stirpium aduersaria noua, perfacilis vestigatio luculentaqne [sic] accessio ad priscorum praesertim Dioscoridis recentiorum materiam medicam quibus prope diem accedet altera pars qua coniectaneorum de plantis appendix, de succis medicatis et metallicis sectio antiquae et nouatae medicinae lectionum remedioru[m] thesaurus opulentissimus de succedantis libellus continentur authoribus Petro Pena & Mathia de Lobel medicis [A new notebook of plants etc.] (in Latin). with Pierre Pena. London: Thomae Purfoetii. (Note: Stirpium: Title page inscribed 1570; final page of manuscript (colophon) inscribed 1571) (Note: Stirpium, from Latin stirps, a plant. Adversaria - a daybook or journal) - Also available as Stirpium adversaria nova at Google Books
  - Reissued as:

l'Obel, Matthias de (1576a). Nova stirpium adversaria, perfacilis vestigatio etc. Quibus accessit Appendix cum Indice variarum linguarum Locupletisimo. Additis Guillielmi Rondelletii aliquot Remediorum formulis, nunquam antehac in lucem editis (in Latin). with Pierre Pena. Antwerp: Christophori Plantini. including Rondelet's Formulae remediorum, to be appended as a companion volume to his Plantarum, seu, Stirpium historia of the same year.
Third version 1605.

- l'Obel, Matthias de (1576b). Plantarum, seu, Stirpium historia. Cui annexum est aduersariorum volumen (in Latin). Antwerp: Christophori Plantini.
- l'Obel, Matthias de (1581). Kruydtboeck oft beschrÿuinghe van allerleye ghewassen, kruyderen, hesteren, ende gheboomten (in Dutch). Antwerp: Christoffel Plantyn.
- L'Obel; Myreus, Ludovicus; Rondelet, Guillaume (1605). In G. Rondelletii inclytae Monspeliensis scholae medicae professoris ... methodicam pharmaceuticam officinam animaduersiones, quibus deprauata & mutilata ax authoris mente corriguntur & restaurantur. Accesserunt auctuaria, in antidotaria vulgata censurae beneuolae, & Dilucidae simplicium medicamentorum explicationes, Aduersariorumque volumen, eorumque pars altera & illustramenta, quibus ambigua enodantur. Cum Ludouici Myrei pharmacopolae reginej paragraphis vtiliss (in Latin) (1st ed.). London: Thomae Purfootij.
  - 2nd ed. 1618 (posthumous) as Pharmacopoeia Rondelletii

Posthumous

- l'Obel, Matthias de (1655). Botanographic Regii eximii Stirpium illustrationes : plurimas elaborantes inauditas plantas, subreptitiis Joh: Parkinsoni rapsodiis (ex codice MS insalutato) sparsim gravatae. Ejusdem adjecta sunt ad calcem Theatri botanici Αμαρτηματα, accurante Guil: How, Anglo (in Latin). London: Tho. Warren.
- Rondelet, Guillaume; L'Obel, Matthias de; Myreus, Ludovicus (1618) [1605]. Pharmacopoeia Rondelletii (in Latin) (2nd ed.). Lugduni Batavorum: Ioannem Maire.
  - 3rd. edition P & I Chouët| 1620

Attributed

- Plantarum seu stirpium icones (1st ed.). Antwerp: Christophori Plantini. 1581.
  - Icones stirpium, seu, Plantarum tam exoticarum, quam indigenarum: in gratiam rei herbariae studiosorum in duas partes digestae: cum septem linguarum indicibus, ad diuersarum nationum vsum [Images of plants, both exotic and native, for students of botany, arranged in two parts: with indices in seven languages for the use of different nationalities] (2nd ed.). Antwerp: Christophori Plantini. 1591.
  - 3rd ed. 1655 Warren, London

== Legacy ==
=== Eponymy ===
- The plant genus Lobelia Plum. ex L., and the botanical family Lobeliaceae were named after him by Charles Plumier in 1703. (Note: Plumier was the first person to name plants after people)
- The main-belt asteroid 10057 L'Obel, discovered in 1988 by Eric Walter Elst at the European Southern Observatory, was named in honor of him.

== See also ==
- History of botany

== Bibliography ==
=== Books ===
- Arber, Agnes (1912). Herbals: their origin and evolution. A chapter in the history of botany, 1470–1670 (1st ed.). Cambridge University Press.
  - Arber, Agnes (1986) [1912; 2nd ed. 1938]. Stearn, William T. (ed.). Herbals: their origin and evolution. A chapter in the history of botany, 1470-1670 (3rd ed.). Cambridge: Cambridge University Press. ISBN 978-0-521-33879-0.
- Egmond, Florike (2010). "The garden of Europe: Botany as a courtly fashion in the southern Netherlands. Cultivating plants". The World of Carolus Clusius: Natural History in the Making, 1550-1610. Pickering & Chatto. pp. 22–24. ISBN 978-1-317-32421-8.
- Feingold, Mordechai, ed. (2008). History of Universities: Volume XXIII/2. Oxford: OUP. ISBN 978-0-19-955032-6.
- Gunn, Mary; Codd, L. E. W. (1981). "Mathias de l'Obel, 1605". introductory volume to the Flora of southern Africa: Botanical Exploration Southern Africa. An illustrated history of early botanical literature on the Cape flora, biographical accounts of the leading plant collectors and their activities in southern Africa from the days of the East India company until modern times. Cape Town: A. A. Balkema. pp. 14–15. ISBN 978-0-86961-129-6.
- Harkness, Deborah E. (2007). The Jewel house of art and nature: Elizabethan London and the social foundations of the scientific revolution. New Haven: Yale University Press. ISBN 9780300111965. (see also The Jewel House)
- Helden, Albert Van; Dupré, Sven; Gent, Rob van, eds. (2010). The Origins of the Telescope. Amsterdam University Press. ISBN 978-90-6984-615-6.
- Hoeniger, F. David; Hoeniger, J. F. M. (1969). The Development of Natural History in Tudor England. MIT Press. ISBN 978-0-918016-29-4.
- Louis, A. (1980). Mathieu de l'Obel 1538-1616: épisode de l'histoire de la botanique. Ghent: Story-Scientia. ISBN 978-90-6439-178-1.
- Mallet, J. C.; Jovet, P. (2008). L'obel (or Lobel), Mathias De.
- Ogilvie, Brian W. (2008). The Science of Describing: Natural History in Renaissance Europe. University of Chicago Press. ISBN 978-0-226-62086-2.
- Oliver, Francis W., ed. (1913). Makers of British Botany. Cambridge: Cambridge University Press.
- Pavord, Anna (1999). The Tulip. London: Bloomsbury Publishing. ISBN 0-7475-4296-1.
- Pavord, Anna (2005). The naming of names: the search for order in the world of plants. New York: Bloomsbury. ISBN 978-1-59691-071-3.
- Swimberghe, Piet (1994). "Gardening". Living in Flanders. Lannoo Uitgeverij. pp. 205–231, plate 31. ISBN 978-90-209-2498-5.
- Vande Walle, W.F., ed. (2001). Dodonæus in Japan: translation and the scientific mind in the Tokugawa period. Leuven: Leuven University Press. ISBN 9789058671790.

=== Historical sources ===
- Dodonaeus, Rembertus (1583) [1554]. Stirpium historiae pemptades sex, sive libri XXX [Crvyd-boeck] (in Latin). Antwerp: Plantini.
- Gerard, John (1876) [1596]. Jackson, Benjamin Daydon (ed.). A catalogue of plants cultivated in the garden of John Gerard, in the years 1596–1599 /edited with notes, references to Gerard's Herball, the addition of modern names, and a life of the author, by Benjamin Daydon Jackson. London. (2nd edition 1599)
- Gerard, John (1597). The Herball or Generall Historie of Plantes (1st ed.). London: John Norton.
- Parkinson, John (1640). Theatrum Botanicum : The Theater of Plants. Or, An Herball of a Large Extent, Containing therein a More Ample and Exact History and Declaration of the Physicall Herbs and Plants that are in Other Authours, Encreased by the Accesse of Many Hundreds of New, Rare, and Strange Plants from All the Parts of the World, with Sundry Gummes, and Other Physicall Materials, than hath beene hitherto Published by Any before; and a Most Large Demonstration of their Natures and Vertues. Shevving vvithall the Many Errors, Differences, and Oversights of Sundry Authors that have Formerly Written of Them; and a Certaine Confidence, or most Probable Conjecture of the True and Genuine Herbes and Plants. Distributed into Sundry Classes or Tribes, for the More Easie Knowledge of the Many Herbes of One Nature and Property, with the Chiefe Notes of Dr. Lobel, Dr. Bonham, and Others Inserted therein. Collected by the Many Years Travaile, Industry, and Experience in this Subject, by Iohn Parkinson Apothecary of London, and the Kings Herbalist. And Published by the Kings Majestyes Especiall Priviledge. London: Thomas Cotes.
- Mortier, Barthélemy-Charles Du (1873). Opuscules de botanique 1862-1873. Brussels: G. Mayolez. p. 18.
- Plumier, Charles (1703). "Lobelia". Nova plantarum americanarum genera. Parisiis: Joannem Boudot. pp. 21–22.
- Sachs, Julius von (1890) [1875]. "The Botanists of Germany and the Netherlands from Brunfels to Kaspar Bauhin. 1530–1623". Geschichte der Botanik vom 16. Jahrhundert bis 1860 [History of botany (1530-1860)]. translated by Henry E. F. Garnsey, revised by Isaac Bayley Balfour. Oxford: Oxford University Press. pp. 13–36. doi:10.5962/bhl.title.30585.

=== Bibliography ===
- Johnston, Stanley H. (1992). The Cleveland Herbal, Botanical, and Horticultural Collections: A Descriptive Bibliography of Pre-1830 Works from the Libraries of the Holden Arboretum, the Cleveland Medical Library Association, and the Garden Center of Greater Cleveland. Kent State University Press. ISBN 978-0-87338-433-9.
- Stafleu, Frans A.; Cowan, Richard S. (1981). "L'Obel, Mathias de". Taxonomic literature: a selective guide to botanical publications and collections with dates, commentaries and types. Vol. 3. Lh–O (2nd ed.). Utrecht: Bohn, Scheltema & Holkema. pp. 130–132. ISBN 9789031302246.

=== Chapters ===
- Egmond, Florike (18 December 2008). Apothecaries as experts and brokers in the sixteenth-century network of the naturalist Carolus Clusius. OUP Oxford. pp. 59–91. ISBN 9780199550326., in Feingold (2008)
- van Berkel, Klaas (2010). The city of Middelburg, cradle of the telescope. Amsterdam University Press. pp. 45–72. ISBN 9789069846156., in Helden et al (2010)
- Vines, Sydney Howard. Robert Morison 1620–1683 and John Ray 1627–1705. pp. 8–43., in Oliver (1913)
- Visser, Robert (2001). Dodonaeus and the herbal tradition. Leuven University Press. pp. 44–58. ISBN 9789058671790., in Vande Walle (2001)

=== Articles ===
- Houtzager, HL (27 November 1976). "Matthias Lobelius, 16e eeuwse kruidkundige en geneesheer" [Mathias Lobelius, 16th century herbalist and physician] (PDF). Nederlands Tijdschrift voor Geneeskunde (in Dutch). 120 (4–): 2110–3. PMID 796733.
- Louis, Armand (1957). "Considérations historiques sur une flore pseudo-lobélienne". Bulletin du Jardin botanique de l'État à Bruxelles. 27 (2): 317–326. doi:10.2307/3666966. JSTOR 3666966.
- Thomson, Samuel (1884) [1822]. "Life and Medical Discoveries of Samuel Thomson". Bulletin of the Lloyd Library of Botany, Pharmacy and Materia Medica. III (11). Lloyd Library and Museum.

=== Websites ===
- "Matthias de L'Obel, 1538-1616: Plantarum, Seu, Stirpium Historia". Hauck Botanical online exhibit. Cincinnati Museum. 2017. Archived from the original on 27 September 2007.
- EB (9 December 2008). "Matthias de L'Obel". Encyclopædia Britannica.
- Westfall, Richard S. (1995). "L'Obel, Mathias de". The Galileo Project. Rice University.
- Wheelock, Arthur K. (24 April 2014). "Bosschaert, Ambrosius Dutch, 1573 - 1621" (PDF). Collection: Artists. National Gallery of Art.
- "Mathias de Lobel". Summa Gallicana (in Italian).
- "Cabinet of curiosities: L'Obel's Plantarum seu Stirpium Icones". Hunt Institute for Botanical Documentation. Carnegie Mellon Library. 15 August 2016.
- "Lobel, Matthias de. Plantarum seu stirpium icones. Antwerp: Chistopher Plantin, 1581". Important Botanical Books. New York: Christie's. 18 December 2002.
- Spiceland, Erin (2015). "Mathieu Lobel". Geni.
- "Digitized images. Lobel 1576, 1605". History of Science: Image galleries. History of Science Collections, University of Oklahoma Libraries.
