= Pieter van der Borcht the Elder =

Flemish painter

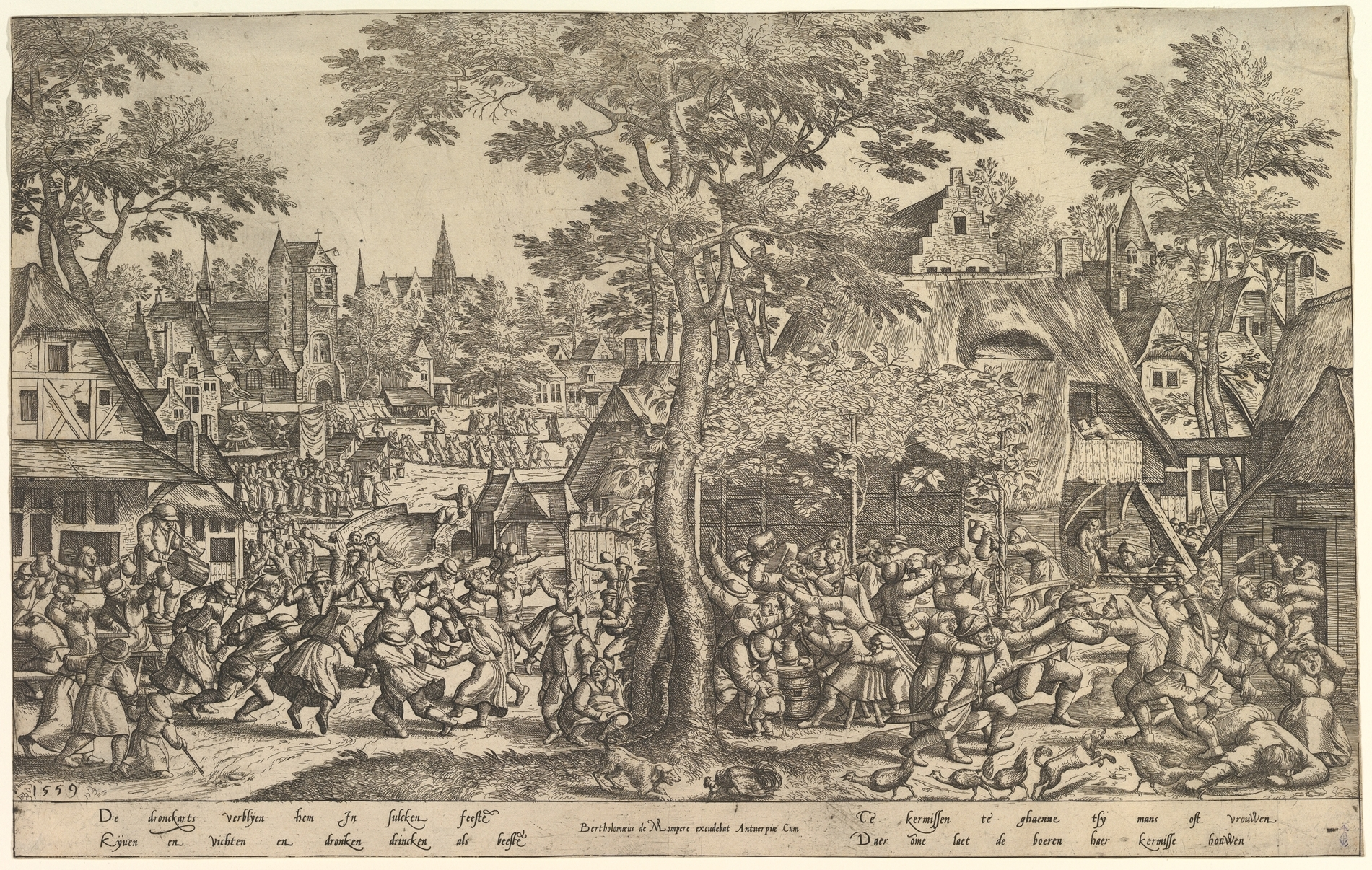
Peasant Fair, after Pieter Bruegel the Elder, 1559

Pieter van der Borcht (I) or Peter van der Borcht (c. 1530–1608) was a Flemish Renaissance painter, draughtsman and etcher. He is regarded as one of the most gifted botanical painters of the 16th century. Pieter van der Borcht the Elder also introduced new themes, such as the "monkey scene" (also called singerie) into Northern art.

== Life ==
Pieter van der Borcht was born in Mechelen, Belgium. There are indications that Pieter van der Borcht was the son of Jacques van der Borcht. Jacques van der Borcht was an artist who was regarded in 1562 as the dean of the Mechelen Guild of Saint Luke. Pieter van der Borcht is recorded in 1564 as working from Mechelen for Christopher Plantin, who operated a famous book printing and publishing enterprise in Antwerp. He supplied Plantin with the drawings for the engravings for many scientific publications by Plantin such as the works of Rembert Dodoens, Carolus Clusius and Matthias de l'Obel.

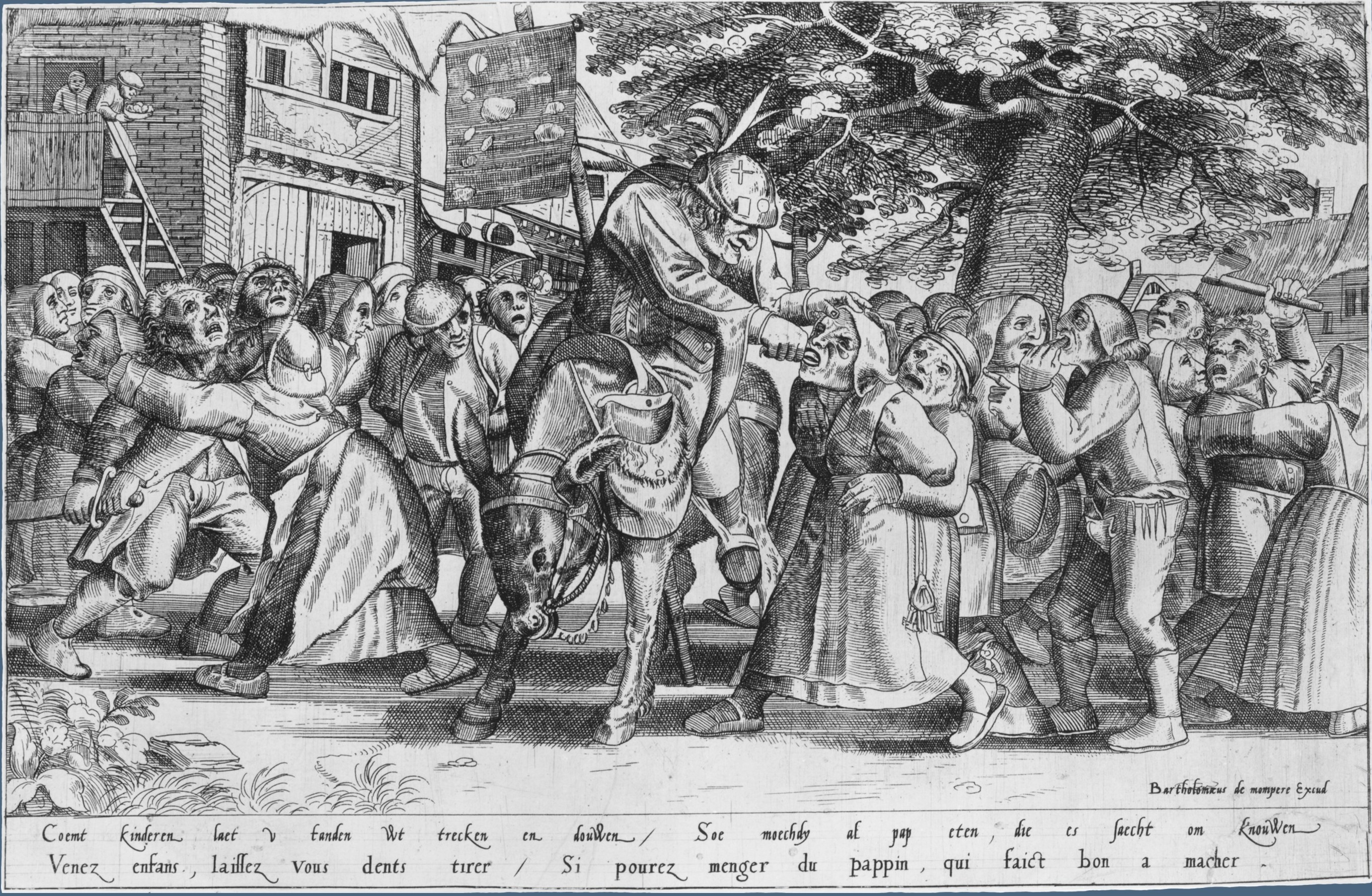
The Tooth Puller

While van der Borcht was still living in Mechelen in 1572, the city, which had risen against the Spanish occupiers was retaken and sacked by Spanish troops under the Duke of Alva. The plundering of the city lasted for three days. Van der Borcht and his family were able to flee to Antwerp. Here Plantin gave them free lodgings in his own house. A letter of Plantin testifies to the fact that the departure from Mechelen of the van der Borcht family must have been very sudden, as on their arrival in Antwerp both parents were sick and their children naked.

Van der Borcht did not leave Antwerp, where he became a full-time assistant of Plantin. He illustrated many liturgical books published by Plantin, mainly for the Spanish market. He probably became a member of the Antwerp Guild of Saint Luke in 1580 and was its dean from 1589 to 1592. Some art historians have questioned that the "Pieter Verborcht, painter" who became a master in the Guild of Saint Luke in Antwerp in 1580 and served as its dean in 1591 and 1592 was the same as Pieter van der Borcht (I), since it was unlikely that a non-citizen would be allowed to hold this position in the Guild at that time.

Pieter had a son also called Pieter van der Borcht, who became an artist. It is not clear whether he is one of the painters active under that name in Brussels.

== Work ==
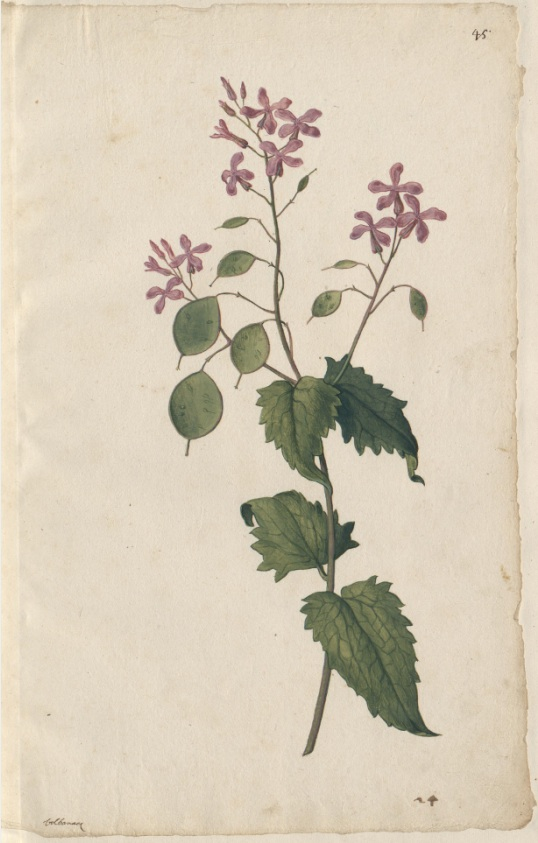
Drawing of a Flower, from the Libri picturati

The subjects of his work are genre, historical and religious themes. There is some debate as to whether works executed under the name Pieter van der Borcht were made by a single artist or several artists with the same name. The attributed works include a large number of drawings, engravings, etchings and woodcuts that were mostly used as book illustrations. The themes of these works include biblical and mythological subjects, genre scenes, pictures depicting the months and botanical illustrations. So either the artist was extremely productive and versatile, or anywhere from two to four artists active during that same time cooperated with him in this production.

The first published work of art attributed to Pieter van der Borcht (I) was printed in 1552 by Jacob van Liesvelt's son Hans van Liesvelt II in a book written by Frans Vervoort entitled Dat vyants net, der booser wercken raet, visioenen ende met alder sijnder verholender stricken. The book contains 17 woodcut illustrations. The final illustration is an image of the Virgin Mary holding the symbol of the city of Mechelen and was signed "Fecit Petrus van der Boercht 1552".

In 1564 Pieter van der Borcht made the drawings but not the woodcuts for an emblem book (the Emblemata of Sambucus) for Plantin. This was followed by a commission in 1565 to make 60 drawings of plants for a herbarium written by Rembert Dodoens, the Frumentorum, leguminum, palustrium et aquatilium herbarum historia. Both author and publisher were very happy with the quality of van der Borcht's drawings and he became the regular illustrator for Plantin's numerous botanical books. Van der Borcht made drawings for Clusius' Rariorum aliquot stirpium per Hispanias observatarum historia (1567)(one of the earliest books on Spanish flora), which were cut by Gerard van Kampen. The originals of these drawings are contained in the Libri picturati A. 16-31 held by the Jagiellonian Library of the Jagiellonian University in Kraków (originally in the former Preußische Staatsbibliothek of Berlin). The 1.400 drawings are of very high quality. Van der Borcht made more than 3,180 botanical watercolours for Plantin. These drawings were the basis for woodcuts made by three of Plantin's regular woodcutters known by name: Arnold Nicolaï, and later Gerard van Kampen and Cornelis Muller.

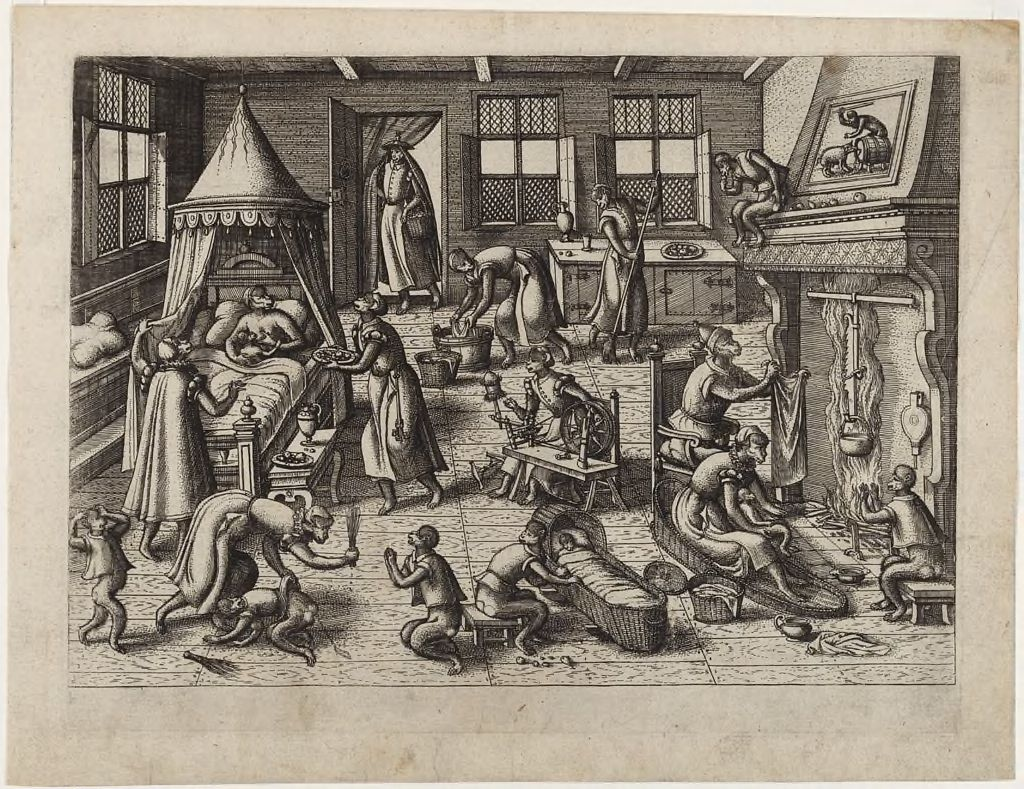
The Nursery, c. 1585, an example of a singerie

Pieter van der Borcht later began to engrave his own work. He was one of the first to work in the new medium of copperplate engraving and etching that came into use after 1564. This medium finally replaced woodcuts in most of Plantin's publications. Pieter van der Borcht also designed a number of official printer's marks of Plantin.

He may have been responsible for a number of engravings of peasant weddings, country fairs and feasts after the work of contemporary Flemish painters such as Pieter Bruegel the Elder, as well as of mythological and historical subjects.

Pieter van der Borcht the Elder contributed to the spread of the genre of the "monkey scene", also called singerie (a word, which in French means a 'comical grimace, behaviour or trick'). Comical scenes with monkeys appearing in human attire and a human environment are a pictorial genre that was initiated in Flemish art in the 16th century and was subsequently further developed in the 17th century. Pieter van der Borcht introduced the singerie as an independent theme around 1575 in a series of prints, which are strongly embedded in the artistic tradition of Pieter Bruegel the Elder. These prints were widely disseminated and the theme was then picked up by other Flemish artists, in particular by those in Antwerp, such as Frans Francken the Younger, Jan Brueghel the Elder and the Younger, Sebastiaen Vrancx and Jan van Kessel the Elder. David Teniers the Younger became the principal practitioner of the genre and developed it further with his younger brother Abraham Teniers. Later in the 17th century Nicolaes van Verendael started to paint these "monkey scenes" as well. Some historians question whether the Pieter van der Borcht responsible for this body of work should be identified with Pieter van der Borcht (I).

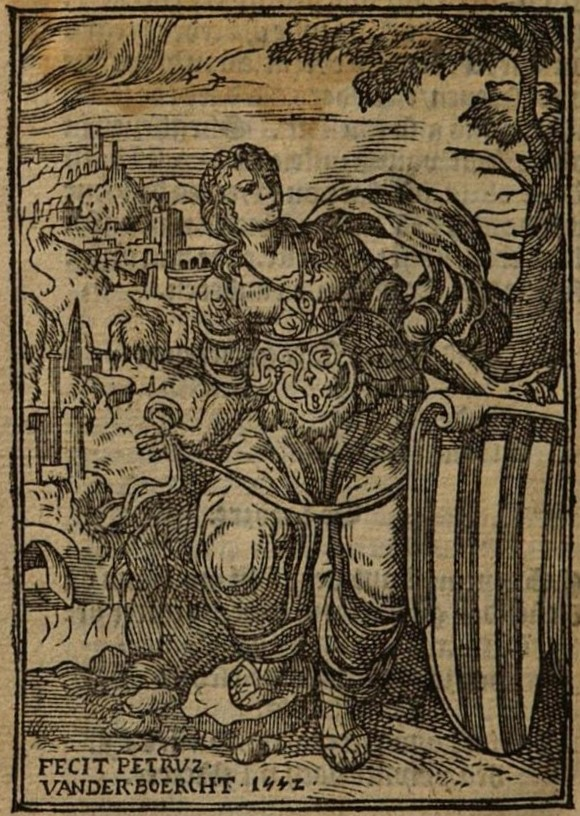
Printer's Mark for Dat Vyants net der booser wercken, 1552

A landscape painting attributed to Pieter van der Borcht (I) entitled The Rest on the Flight into Egypt is part of the collection of the Brighton and Hove Museums and Art Galleries in the United Kingdom.

== Selected books illustrated by Pieter van der Borcht (I) ==
Below is a selection of the many books illustrated by Pieter van der Borcht for Plantin and other publishers such as Jan Moretus:

- Cruydeboek, Rembert Dodoens, 1563.
- Emblemata cum aliquot nummis antiqui operis, Joannes Sambucus, 1564.
- Aromatum et simplicium aliquot medicamentorum apud Indos cascentium Historia, Garcia ab Horto, 1567.
- Centum Fabulae ex antiquis auctoribus delectae, 1567.
- Horae Beatissimae Virginis Mariae, 1570.
- Humanae Salutis Monumenta, Arius Montanus, 1571.
- Missale Romanum ex decreto sacrosacti Concilii Tridentini restitutum, 1572.
- Officium B. Mariae Virginis, 1573.
- Missale Romanum, 1574.
- Breviarium, 1575.
- Rariorum aliquot stirpium per Hispanias observatarum historia, 1576 (Moretus).
- Evangeliorum Domincalium Summaria, 1580.
- Imagines et Figurae Bibliorum, 1581 (Moretus).
- Bedieninghe der Anatomien, David van Mauden, 1583.
- Biblia Sacra, 1583.

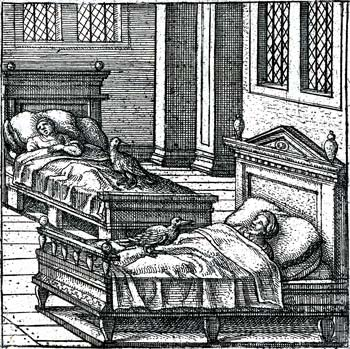
Caladrius visiting the sick

- Metamorphoses. Argumenta, P. Ovidii N, 1596 (Moretus).
- Several other liturgical works, published by Plantin or Jan Moretus, until 1598.
