= George Baker (surgeon) =

English surgeon

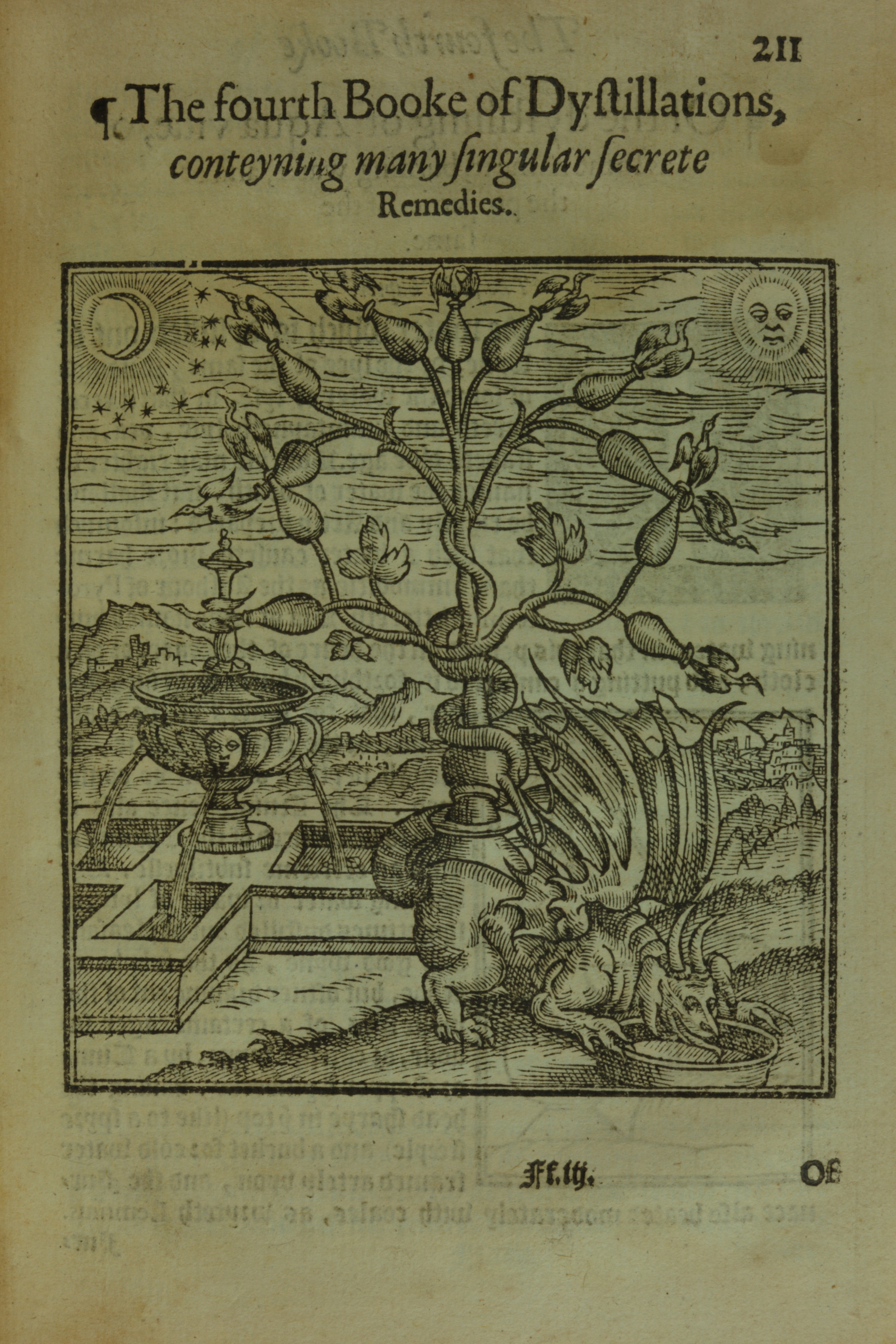
The new Iewell of Health, 1576, The fourth Booke of Dystillations, p. 211, Science History Institute

George Baker (1540 – 1600) was an English surgeon notable for writing and translating a number of early medical texts.

== Career as surgeon ==
Baker was a member of the [[Company of Barbers and Surgeons of London]] and was elected master in 1597. In 1574, when he published his first book, Baker was attached to the household of the Earl of Oxford, and the writings of his contemporaries show that he had already attained to considerable practice in London. Banester of Nottingham speaks of his eminence in Latin verse:— Ergo Bakere tuum superabit sidera nomen, Atque aliqua semper parte superstes eris. And Clowes, another contemporary, prophesies the lasting fame of his works in English verse of the same quality. The apex of his career was serving as the personal surgeon to Queen Elizabeth I.

== Published works ==
Baker's first book was called The Composition or Making of the most excellent and pretious Oil called Oleum Magistrale and the Third Book of Galen. A Method of Curing Wounds and of the Errors of Surgeons. In 1576 Baker published a translation of the Evonymus of Conrad Gessner under the title of The Newe Jewell of Health, wherein is contained the most excellent Secretes of Physicke and Philosophie divided into fower bookes. Baker's own preface to the Newe Jewell is a good piece of English prose. He defends, as do many authors of that time, the writing a book on a learned subject in the vulgar tongue. He was in favour of free translation, "for if it were not permitted to translate but word for word, then I say, away with all translations".

The book treats of the chemical art, a term used by Baker as synonymous with the art of distillation. Distilled medicines, he says, exceed all others in power and value, "for three drops of oil of sage doth more profit in the palsie, three drops of oil of coral for the falling sickness, three drops of oil of cloves for the cholicke, than one pound of these decoctions not distilled". Both in this and in his other treatises on pharmacy, the processes are not always fully described, for Baker was, after all, against telling too much. "As for the names of the simples, I thought it good to write them in the Latin as they were, for by the searching of their English names the reader shall very much profit; and another cause is that I would not have every ignorant asse to be made a chirurgian by my book, for they would do more harm with it than good".

Baker's Antidotarie of Select Medicine, 1579, is another work of the same kind. He also published two translations of books on general surgery: Guido's Questions, 1579, and Vigo's Chirurgical Works, 1586. Both had been translated before, and were merely revised by Baker. He wrote an essay on the nature and properties of quicksilver in a book by his friend Clowes in 1584, and an introduction to the Herball of their common friend John Gerard in 1597. The Galen was reprinted in 1599, as also was the Jewell under the altered title of The Practice of the New and Olde Physicke.

== Bibliography ==
- Gerard, John (1597). The Herball or Generall Historie of Plantes (1st ed.). London: John Norton.
- Pavord, Anna (2005). The naming of names the search for order in the world of plants. New York: Bloomsbury. ISBN 9781596919655.
- This article incorporates text from a publication now in the public domain: Moore, Norman (1885). "Baker, George (1540-1600)". In Stephen, Leslie (ed.). Dictionary of National Biography. Vol. 3. London: Smith, Elder & Co. p. 7.
