= Henry Lyte (botanist) =

Sixteenth century English botanist

Henry Lyte The Elder
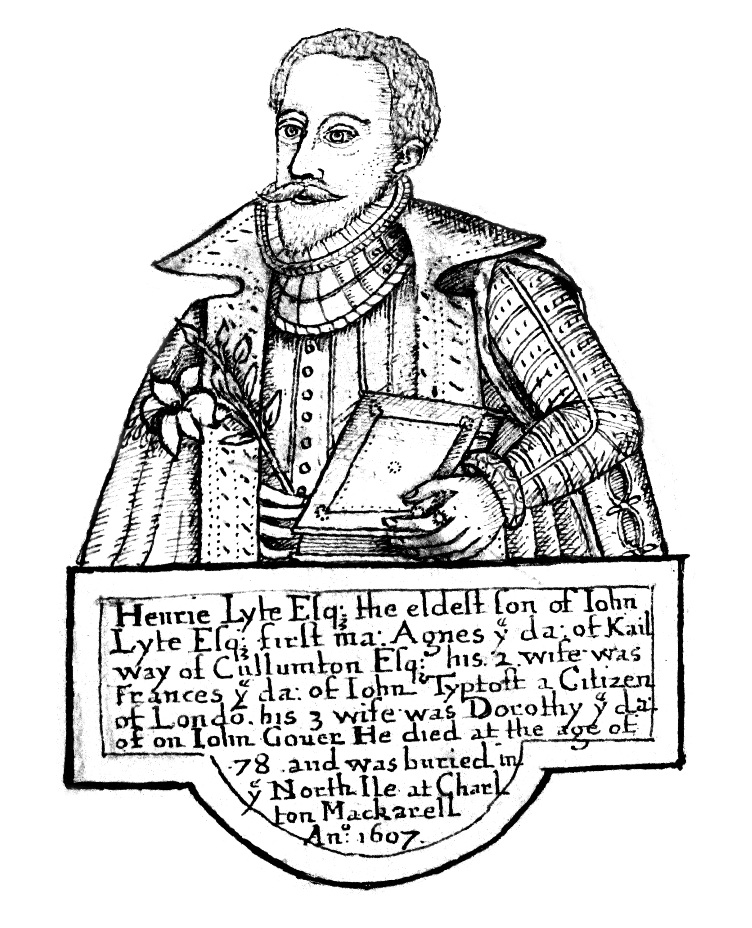
- Portrait of Henry Lyte
- Born: 1529; Lytes Cary Manor, Somerset
- Died: 16 October 1607 (aged 77–78); Lytes Cary Manor
- Resting place: Charlton Mackrell Church; 51.0525°N 2.6744°W
- Other name: Henry the Elder
- Occupation: Sherriff of Somerset
- Spouse(s): Agnes Kelloway (1546 - 1564) Francis Tiptoft (1565 - 1589) Dorothy Gover (1591)
- Children: 13
- Parent(s): John Lyte, Edith Horsey

Academic background
- Education: Clifford's Inn
- Alma mater: Oxford University

Academic work
- Main interests: Botany; History
- Notable works: A niewe Herball (1578); The Light of Britayne (1588)

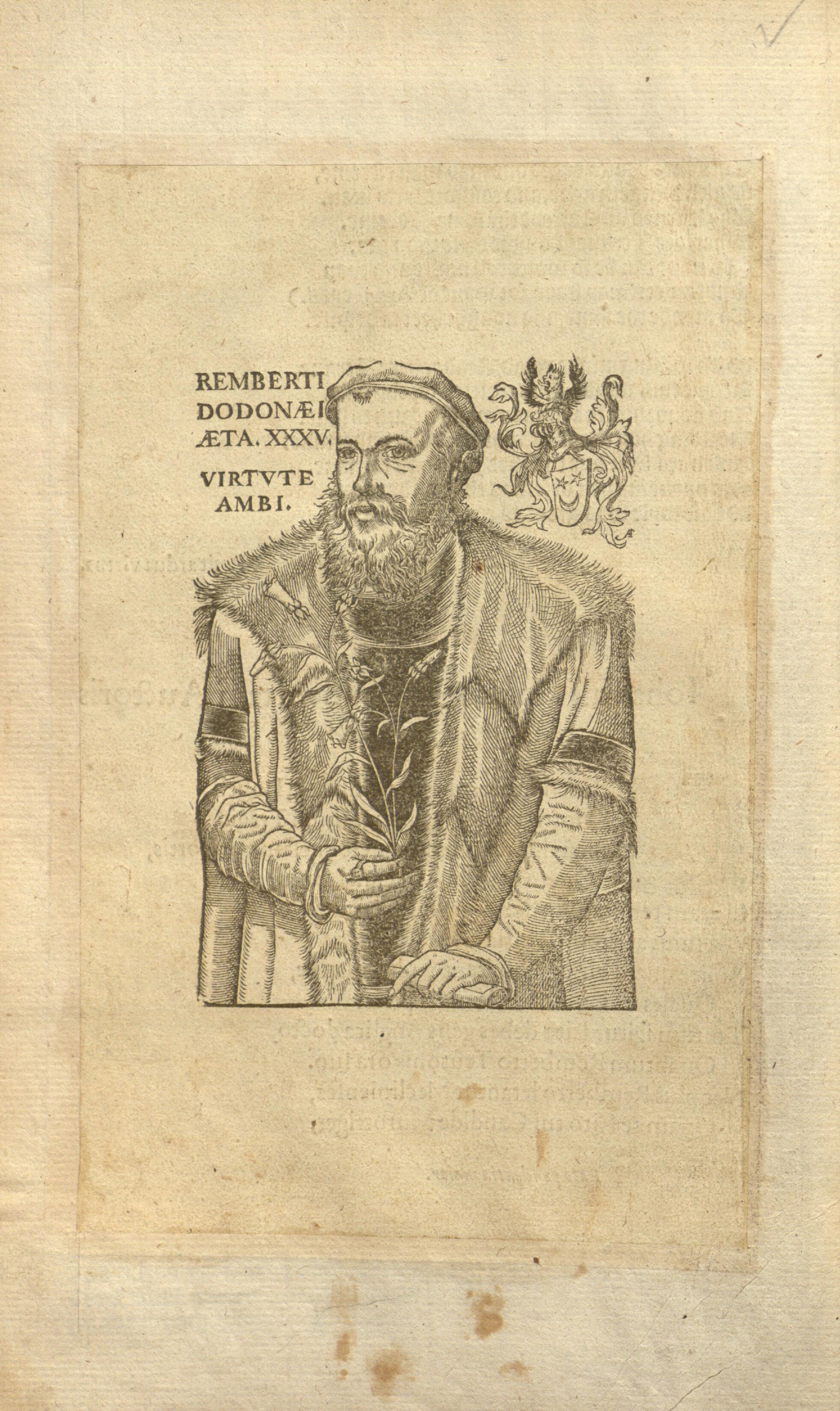
Rembert Dodoens

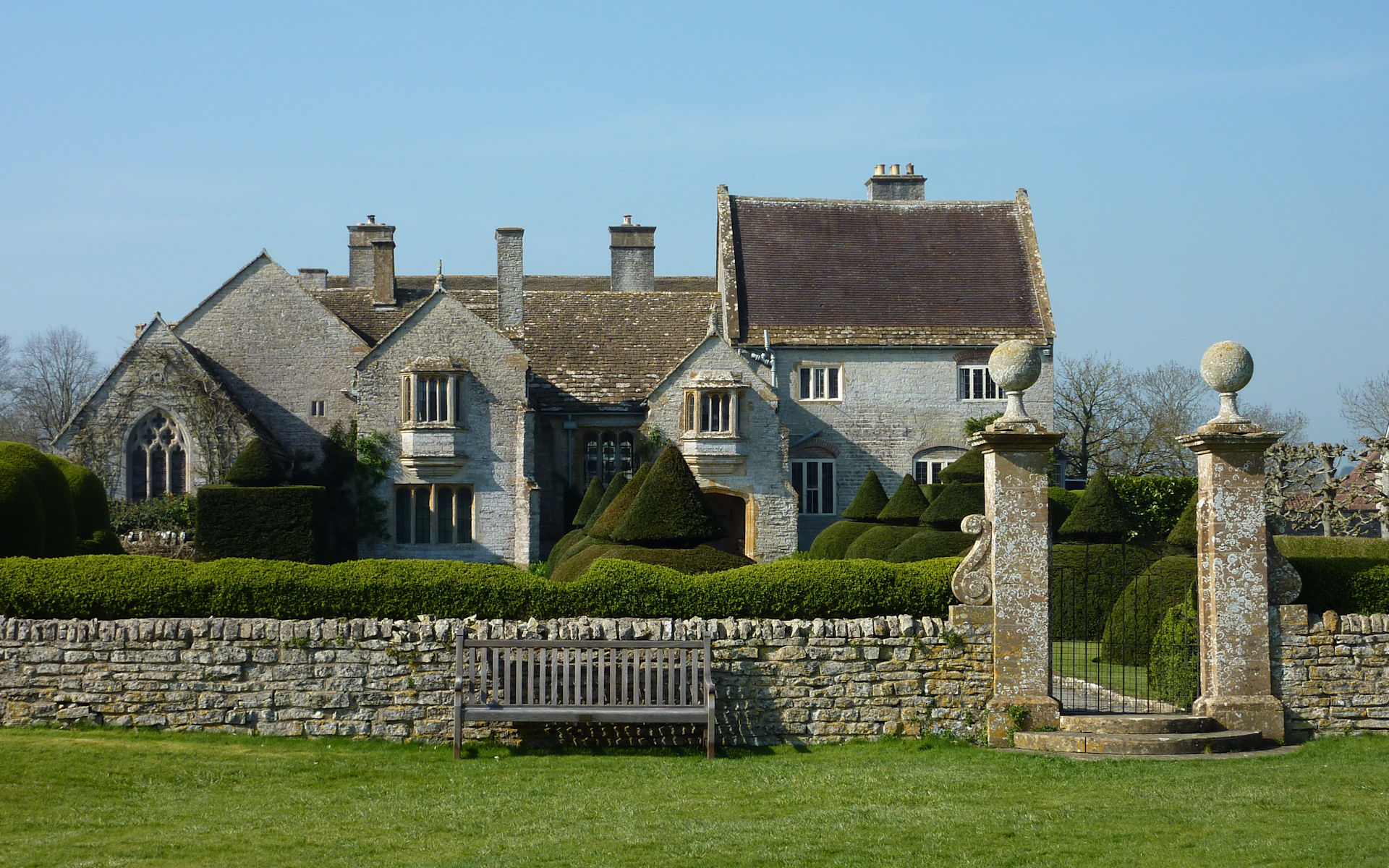
Lytes Cary Manor, Somerset

Henry Lyte (1529? – 16 October 1607), also known as Henry the Elder, was an English botanist and antiquary. He is best known for two works, A niewe Herball (1578), which was a translation of the Cruydeboeck of Rembert Dodoens (Antwerp, 1564), and an antiquarian volume, The Light of Britayne: a Recorde of the honorable Originall and Antiquitie of Britaine (1588), both of which are dedicated to Queen Elizabeth I.

== Life ==
Henry Lyte was born at Lytes Cary Manor, Somerset, about 1529, and was the second and eldest surviving son of John Lyte, by his first wife, Edith Horsey, who died in 1566. Lyte became a student at Oxford about 1546, but it is not known whether he took a degree. Anthony à Wood writes of him: "After he had spent some years in logic and philosophy, and in other good learning, he travelled into foreign countries, and at length retired to his patrimony, where, by the advantage of a good foundation of literature made in the university and abroad, he became a most excellent scholar in several sorts of learning."

In 1558, John Lyte made over his property to Henry who managed the Somerset estate until his father's death in 1576, when his stepmother brought a writ of dower against him. Lyte seems to have served as sheriff, or perhaps only as under-sheriff, of Somerset during the reign of Mary I, and perhaps until the second year of Elizabeth (that is, 1559).

Lyte was married three times: in September 1546 to Agnes, daughter and heiress of John Kelloway of Collumpton, Devon, who died in 1564, and by whom he had five daughters; in July 1565 to Frances, daughter of John Tiptoft, citizen of London, who died in 1589, and by whom he had three sons and two daughters; and in 1591 to Dorothy, daughter of John Gover of Somerton, Somerset, by whom he had two sons and a daughter. Lyte was a distant connection of antiquarian John Aubrey, who says that Henry Lyte "had a pretty good collection of plants for that age," though an extant list in the handwriting of Lyte's second son and successor, Thomas, enumerates only various fruit trees.

== Work ==
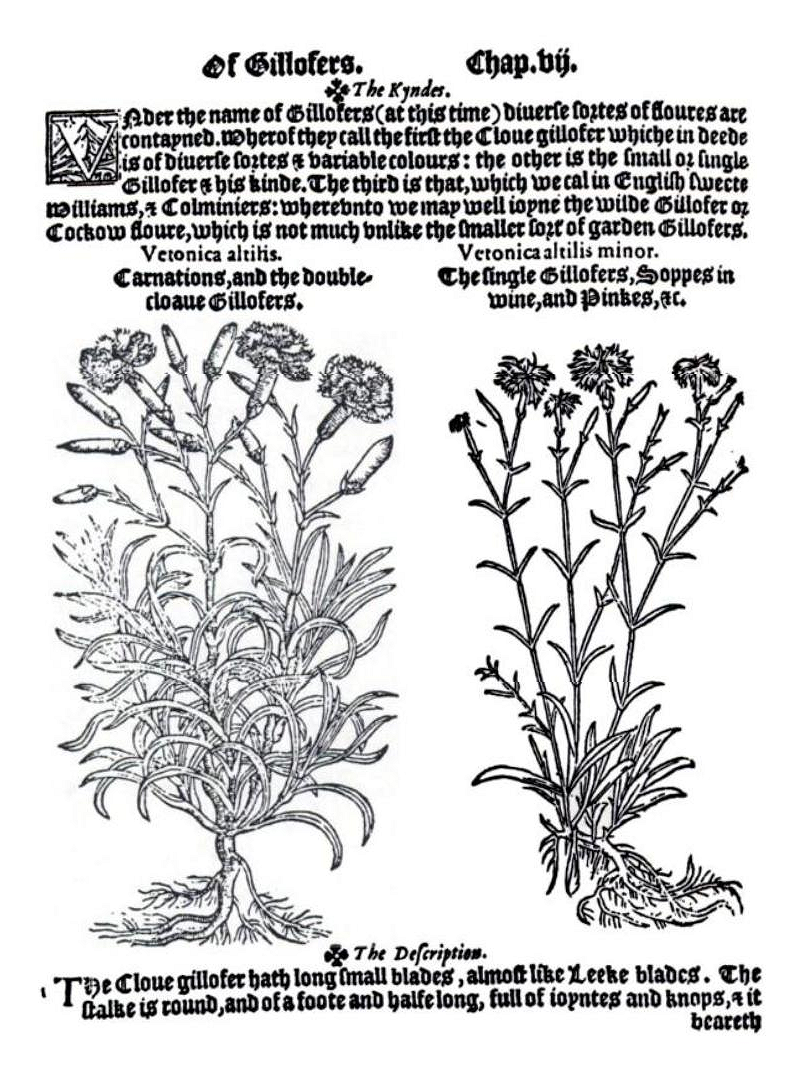
A page on gillofers (gillyflowers, that is, carnations and pinks), from A niewe Herball by Henry Lyte, 1578.

Lyte's first and most important work was his translation of the Cruydeboeck of Rembert Dodoens (Antwerp, 1554) by way of the 1557 French translation of Charles de L'Ecluse (Histoire des Plantes). His copy of the French edition endorsed on the title page "Henry Lyte taught me to speake English" is now in the British Museum. It bears numerous annotations in Latin and English in his neat handwriting, including references to the works of Matthias de Lobel and William Turner. The first edition of the translation was printed in folio at Antwerp, to secure the woodcuts of the original; the blocks being too heavy and valuable to transport. It has 779 pages and 870 cuts, about thirty of which are original, and is mostly in blackletter. It bears the title, A niewe Herball or Historie of Plantes. . . . first set foorth in the Doutche or Allmaigne tongue by that learned D. Remburt Dodoens, Physition to the Emperour: And now first translated out of French into English by Henry Lyte, Esquyer. At London by me Gerard Dewes, dwelling in Pawles Church-yarde, at the signe of the Swanne, 1578. On the back of the title-page is Lyte's coat of arms and a crest, "a swan volant silver upon a trumpet gold," which was not actually granted him by Clarenceux King of Arms uпtil the following year. This is followed by a dedication to Queen Elizabeth, dated from Lytes Сarу, commendatory verses, and a portrait of Dodoens. Lyte added very little original matter to the text. A second edition, without any woodcuts, was printed in London by Ninian Newton, in square octavo, in 1586, and a third by Edmund Bollifant, in the same size, in 1595. A folio edition, also without woodcuts, was published by Edward Griffin in 1619.

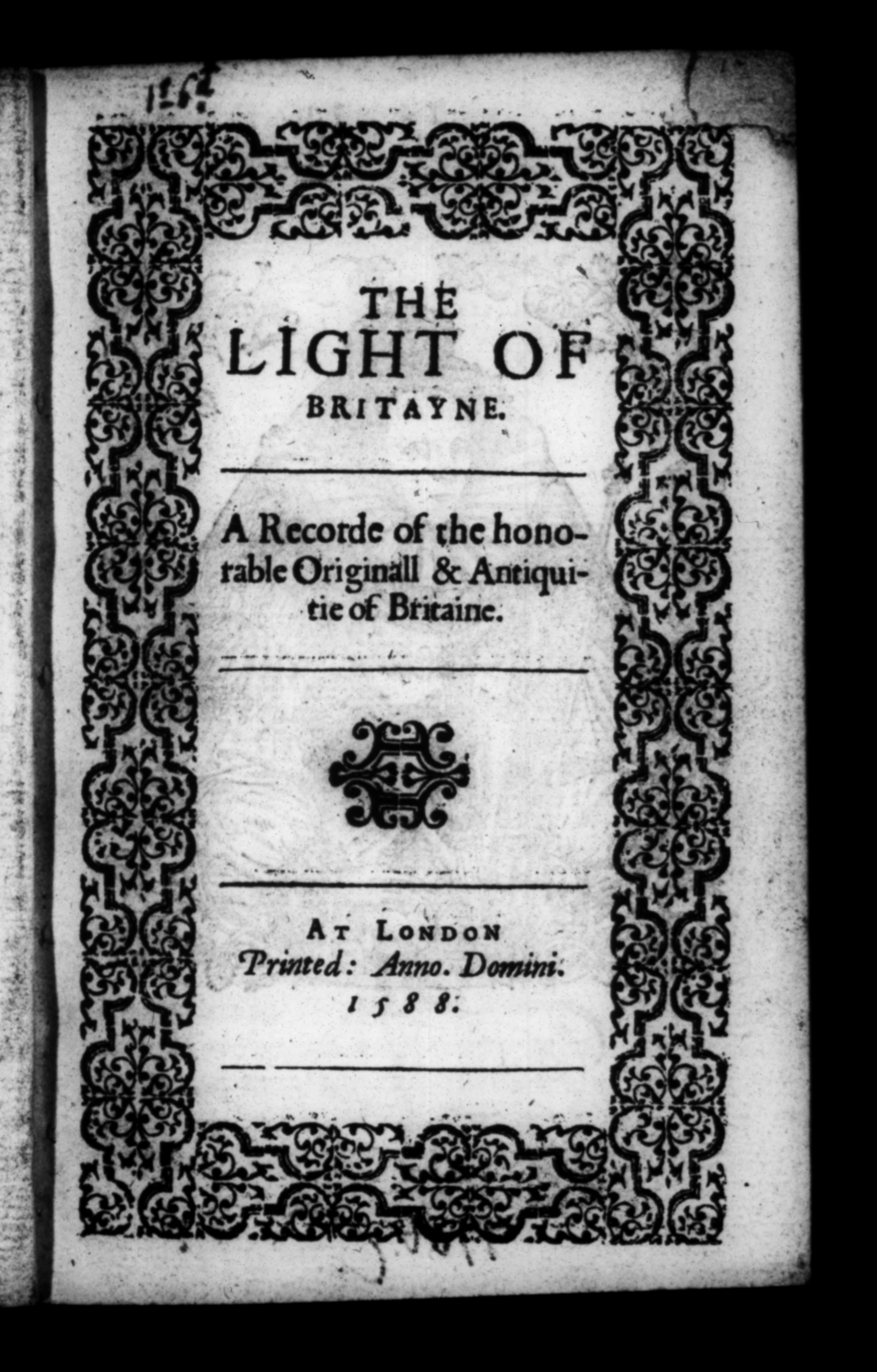
Cover of The Light of Britayne by Henry Lyte

Lyte's second work was The Light of Britayne; a Recorde of the honourable Originall and Antiquitie of Britaine (1588), also dedicated to Elizabeth, and containing her portrait. Its object is to trace the descent of the British from Brutus of Troy. Lyte presented a copy of this work to the queen on 24 November 1588, when she went in state to St. Paul's to return thanks for the defeat of the Spanish Armada.

== List of selected publications ==
- Lyte, Henry (1586). A new herball, or, Historie of plants : wherein is contained the whole discourse and perfect description of all sorts of herbes and plants : their diuers and sundrie kindes : their names, natures, operations, & vertues : and that not onely of those which are heere growing in this our countrie of England, but of all others also of forraine realms commonly used in physicke, First set foorth in the Douch or Almaigne toong. London: Ninian Newton.
- Lyte, Henry (1588). The Light of Britayne: A Recorde of the honorable Originall & Antiquitie of Britaine. London.

== Legacy ==
Lyte died in the house in which he was born, Lytes Cary Manor, on 16 October 1607, and was buried at the north end of the transept of Charlton Mackrell Church. A copy of his Niewe Herball is preserved at his family home, a property now managed by the National Trust.

== Bibliography ==
- Arber, Agnes, editor. Herbals: Their Origin and Evolution, Cambridge University Press, 1986 reprint of 1938 edition, ISBN 0-521-33879-4
- Lee, Sidney, ed. (1893). "Lyte, Henry (1529?-1607)" . Dictionary of National Biography. Vol. 34. London: Smith, Elder & Co. p. 364.
