= Thomas Johnson (botanist) =

English apothecary and botanist

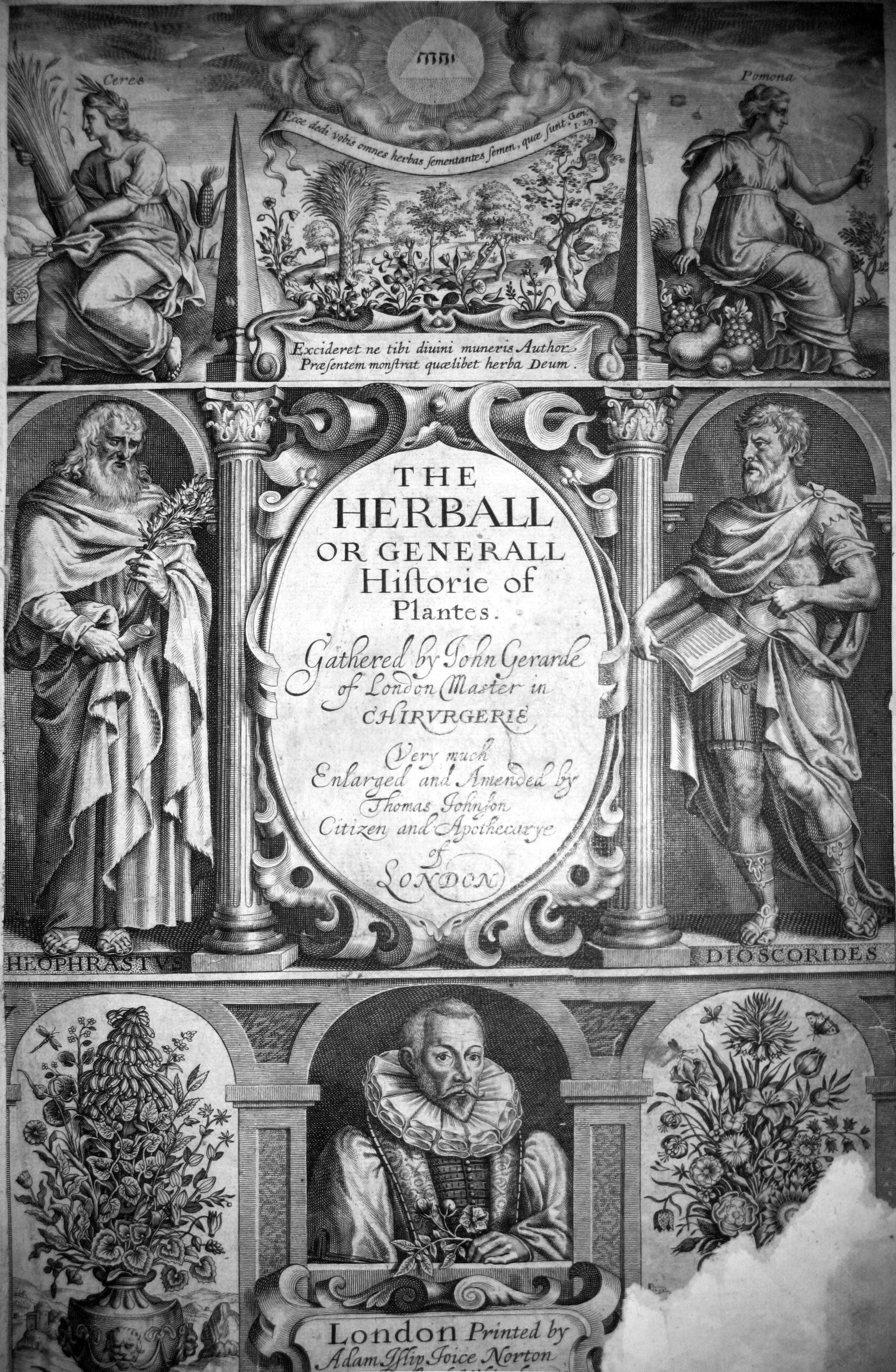
- Title page of Johnson's 1633 edition of Gerard's Herball
- Born: 1595–1600; Selby, Yorkshire, England
- Died: 1644; Hampshire
- Occupations: apothecary, botanist
- Writing career
- Notable works: John Gerard's Herball, expanded

Thomas Johnson (died 1644) was an English botanist, and a royalist colonel in the English Civil War. He has been called the "father of British field botany".

== Life ==
Johnson was born at Selby in Yorkshire between 1595 and 1600. He seems to have received a good education, and to have become an apothecary in London by 1626. Possibly before that he was living in Lincolnshire (Gerard, Herball, ed. 1633, p. 74). In 1629 he was in business on Snow Hill, city of London, where he had a physic-garden, and had become a prominent member of the Apothecaries' Company.

On the outbreak of the civil war Johnson joined the royalists, and, partly for his learning, partly no doubt for his loyalty, was made a Bachelor of physic by the University of Oxford in 1642, and M.D. on 9 May 1643. Johnson took an active part in the defence of Basing House, becoming lieutenant-colonel to Sir Marmaduke Rawdon, the governor, and on 14 September 1644, during a skirmish with a detachment of Sir William Waller's troops under Colonel Richard Norton, he received a shot in the shoulder, "whereby contracting a feaver, he died a fortnight after" (Siege of Basing Castle, 1644).

== Work ==
Johnson's first work was a short account of one of the herborising excursions which the company was in the habit of undertaking. This, the first local catalogue of plants published in England, was entitled "Iter Plantarum Investigationis ergo susceptum a decem Sociis in Agrum Cantianum, anno Dom. 1629, Julii 13" (London, 1629), and an appendix of three pages is headed "Ericetum Hamstedianum seu Plantarum ibi crescentium observatio habita anno eodem 1 Augusti." Johnson seems (Herball, p. 450) to have been in Kent in 1626, and to have revisited both that county and Hampstead Heath, as in 1632 he published an enlarged edition of both lists. The plants are named in them according to Lobel, Dodoens, and Gerard. Anna Pavord provides an account of this expedition in her book, The Naming of Names following Gilmour's translation (Gilmour 1972), stating that he was inspired in his explorations by one of the first descriptions of botanical exploration, that of Ulisse Aldrovandi (1557).

In 1633 Johnson published his most important work, The Herball, … gathered by John Gerarde, … very much enlarged and amended by Thomas Johnson, citizen and apothecary of London. So great had been the progress of botany in the thirty-six years since John Gerard's original publication (1597), that Johnson added over eight hundred new species to the list, and seven hundred figures, besides numerous corrections. The work, which contains about 2,850 descriptions, is commonly known by the name "Gerard emaculatus", given to it by Ray. Johnson seems, however, to have completed it in a year. It was reprinted in 1636 without alteration. Haller styles it "dignum opus, et totius rei herbariæ eo ævo notæ compendium".

In 1634 Johnson published Mercurius Botanicus; sive Plantarum gratia suscepti itineris, anno 1634, descriptio, a description, in seventy-eight pages, of a twelve-day tour to Oxford, Bath, Bristol, Southampton, and the Isle of Wight, with English and Latin names of the plants observed. To this was added De Thermis Bathonicis … Tractatus, pp. 19, with plans of the baths. In 1641 he issued Mercurii Bot. pars altera, describing a visit to Wales and Snowdon, and the discovery of many new plants.

== Legacy ==
Wood speaks of him as "the best herbalist of his age in England," and as "no less eminent in the garrison for his valour and conduct as a soldier." The minor botanical works of Johnson, which became very scarce, were collected and edited by T. S. Ralph in 1847, under the title of Opuscula omnia botanica Thomæ Johnsoni. Genera dedicated to his memory by Miller and by Adanson having become merged in the genera Callicarpa and Cedrela respectively, the name Johnsonia now belongs to a genus of Xanthorrhoeaceae named by Robert Brown.

== Publications ==
- John Gerard's Herball, or general historie of plants first published in 1597 was enlarged by Thomas Johnson and published in 1633 and again in 1636. He included a list of Welsh plant names supplied by Robert Davies. "London: Printed by Adam Islip, Joice Norton and Richard Whitakers, anno 1636."
- The 1633 edition was issued in facsimile by Dover, New York, in 1975: "Complete 1633 edition, as revised and enlarged by Thomas Johnson. Reprint of the ed. printed by A. Islip, J. Norton, and R. Whitakers, London, under title, The herball, or Generall historie of plantes".
- Thomas Shearman Ralph edited Johnson's tracts with the title Opuscula omnia botanica Thomae Johnsoni (Londini: Sumptibus Guliel. Pamplin, 1847):- Iter plantarum investigationis ergo susceptum in agrum cantianum.--Descriptio itineris plantarum investigationis ergo suscepti, in agrum cantianum.-- Mercurius botanicus.--Thermae bathonicae.--Mercurii botanici pars altera.

== Bibliography ==
- Pavord, Anna (2005). The naming of names the search for order in the world of plants. New York: Bloomsbury. ISBN 9781596919655.
- H. Wallis Kew, H.E. Powell (1932). Thomas Johnson, Botanist and Royalist. London: Longmans, Green
- John Scott Lennox Gilmour (editor) (1972). Thomas Johnson: botanical journeys in Kent and Hampstead. Pittsburgh, PA: Hunt Botanical Library.
- An epitome of botanical tours in Wales from the earliest period: Giraldus Cambrensis and Johnson. The Cambrian Journal 1860 pp. 203–217, at 207
- Johnson, Thomas, ed. (1636). Herball, or Generall Historie of Plantes, gathered by John Gerarde. London: Adam Islip, Joice Norton and Richard Whitakers.
