= Francis Delaram =

English engraver

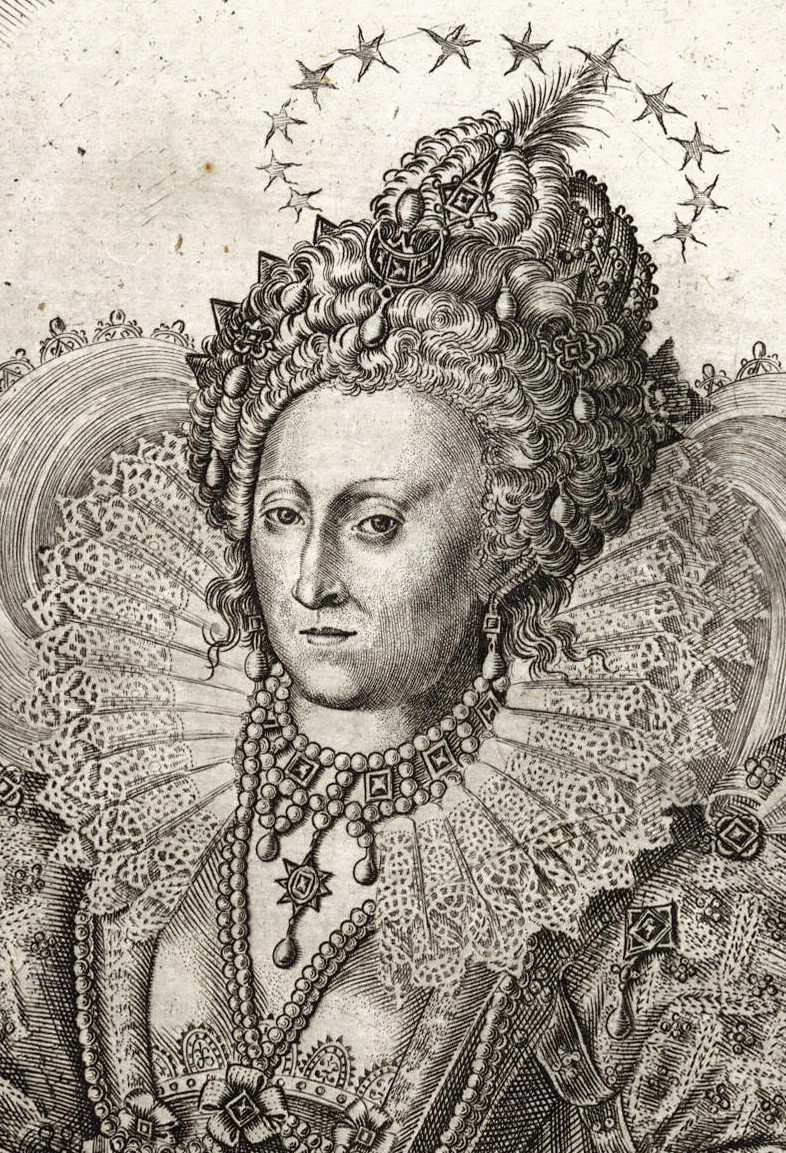
Fragment of a portrait of Elizabeth I of England engraved by Delaram after an original by Nicholas Hilliard.

Francis Delaram (born around 1590, fl. 1615–1624 or 1627), was an English engraver.

Delaram left a substantial collection of engraved portraits, landscapes and book illustrations (specifically, William Camden's Historie), but his life is practically unknown. Sidney Colvin wrote that Delaram, most likely, was born in Flanders. The "frolicsome revels of the musical cherubs" that adorn Delaram's prints indicate strong influence of the Flemish school. Delaram could have been trained by Cornelis Boel, who illustrated the first edition of the King James Bible (1611). Poor execution of the background in Delaram's portrait of Charles I of England according to Shapiro, gives away the contribution of another person employed by Delaram.

Malcolm Charles Salaman and Aymer Vallance noted that male portraits by Delaram stand out for their "grasp of character" but that "when he essayed the Court beauties he was far from justifying their reputation" (Vallance). Salaman wrote that the "vitality of [his] admirable prints" is a strong indication that his portraits of Matthias de Lobel, George Wither and Horace Vere were drawn from life. His portraits of Elizabeth I of England, however, were made after original paintings by Nicholas Hilliard, who expressly authorized one of the prints.
