= The Jewel House =

2007 book by Deborah Harkness

The Jewel House: Elizabethan London and the Scientific Revolution
- Author: Deborah E. Harkness
- Language: English
- Publisher: Yale University Press
- Publication date: 2007
- ISBN: 9780300143164

The Jewel House: Elizabethan London and the Scientific Revolution is a history of 16th-century London by American scholar Deborah Harkness. It explores the alchemical community of London in the 16th century, focusing on key figures from the time period whose accomplishments led to the Scientific Revolution. According to WorldCat, the book is held in 1821 libraries. The book was published in 2007 by Yale University Press.

== Reviews ==
The book was reviewed in Science; Times Literary Supplement; American Scientist; Technology and Culture; Bulletin of the History of Medicine; Isis; Annals of Science; Canadian Journal of History; Renaissance Quarterly; Journal of Modern History; History; American Historical Review; Renaissance Studies; Journal of British Studies; and Journal of Interdisciplinary History.

== Awards ==
- Winner of the 2008 John Ben Snow Foundation Prize for the best book published in any discipline of British Studies covering the period from 1400-1800.
- Winner of the 2008 Pfizer Award for Best Book in the History of Science from 2005-2007.

== Bibliography ==
- Harkness, Deborah E. (2007). The Jewel house of art and nature: Elizabethan London and the social foundations of the scientific revolution. New Haven: Yale University Press. ISBN 9780300111965.
