= Leuven University Press =

Academic publishing house in Leuven, Belgium

- Parent company: KU Leuven
- Founded: 1971
- Country of origin: Belgium
- Headquarters location: Leuven
- Distribution: CB (Netherlands); FMSH-Diffusion (France); NBN International (UK and rest of Europe); Cornell University Press (North America)
- Publication types: Books
- Official website: upers.kuleuven.be

Leuven University Press (Dutch: Universitaire Pers Leuven) is a university press located in Leuven, Belgium. It was established in 1971 in association with KU Leuven. It publishes about forty books a year, with about half being in English or in combined French, German, and Italian, and the other half being in Dutch.
