= Anna Pavord =

British writer

Anna Pavord (born 20 September 1940) is a British horticultural writer. She wrote for The Observer for over twenty years and for The Independent for over thirty years. Her book The Tulip (1999) was listed as a New York Times best seller.

== Life and work ==
Pavord was born in Abergavenny, Monmouthshire, the daughter of headmaster Arthur Vincent Pavord, a best-selling garden author (d. 1989), and Welsh teacher Christabel Lewis (d. 1978). The family had neither TV nor a car and she spent many hours roaming the Welsh mountains with her brother. As a child she loved radio jazz and dancing. She attended Abergavenny High School for Girls the University of Leicester and graduated in 1962 with a B.A.(honours) degree in English.

Pavord married Trevor Ware on 18 June 1966. The couple lived on a sailing barge on the Thames at Shepperton, gardening the 80 feet of riverbank that came with the mooring. The barge is where her first daughter was born. She has three daughters, Oenone (b. 1967), Vanessa (b. 1970) and Tilly (b. 1974); and 12 grandchildren.

"It was at our first house and on the first patch of ground that we actually owned that I really discovered the point of gardening. It wasn't a Pauline conversion. There was no sudden, blinding vision of beauty. I didn't see myself (still don't) trolling through bowers of roses, straw hat just so, gathering blooms into a basket. Nor had I any idea at first of the immense joy of growing food. But I had at least begun to understand that gardening, if it is to be satisfying, requires some sense of permanency. Roots matter. The longer you stay put, the richer the rewards."

The family lived in Sussex and then later, looking for somewhere wilder, bought The Old Rectory in Puncknowle, West Dorset, built for rector Thomas Seeley in 1702. The Georgian estate had one and a half acres of land, including a walled garden, a 13th-century dovecote and a neo-Gothic stone folly, built by Henry Etherington in 1846. It had been empty since the war, the house dilapidated and collapsing the garden overgrown. They spent the first 18 months there, with young children, aged six and four with a third on the way, clearing the land back to the boundaries. They renovated and planted, staying for over thirty years, with no central heating for half that period. She grew peaches, apricots, nectarines, greengages and French pears along the warm garden walls. In 2002 the family moved to another home in Dorset with 18 acres of land and a garden already stocked with 130 species of plant.

Pavord worked as copywriter for Lintas Advertising Agency (1962–63), as production assistant and eventual director of Late Night Line-Up, a daily, live TV and media show on BBC TV 1963–70. She wrote for The Observer (1970–92), The Independent (from 1986), The Sunday Times, Country Life, Country Living and Elle, and was associate editor of Gardens Illustrated (1993–2008). She was the writer and presenter of Flowering Passions, a 10-part TV series on Channel 4, appears regularly on BBC radio and was featured on "Desert Island Discs" in 2017. In The Curious Gardener (2010) Pavord assembles a collection of articles from her newspaper columns. She wrote The Tulip: The Story of a Flower That Has Made Men Mad (1999) which was listed as a New York Times best seller.

Pavord was awarded the Gold Veitch Memorial Medal from the Royal Horticultural Society (1991), and an Honorary Doctor of Letters degree from the University of Leicester (2005). She is a member of the Gardens Panel for English Heritage and chairs the Gardens Panel of the National Trust. She received the Garden Media Guild Lifetime Achievement Award in 2020. Pavord is a trustee of Great Dixter, and was a close friend of Christopher Lloyd.

== Books and publications ==
- Growing Things (1982)
- Foliage (1990)
- The Flowering Year (1991)
- Gardening Companion (1992)
- The Border Book (1994)
- The New Kitchen Garden (1996)
- The Tulip (1999, 2nd edn 2019) Bloomsbury Publishing
- Plant Partners (2001)
- The Naming of Names (2005) or Searching for Order (2009)
- Bulb (2009)
- The Curious Gardener (2010)
- Landskipping (2016)
