= Sideris =

Surname list

Sideris is the surname of the following people

== Surname ==
- Anastasia Loukaitou-Sideris (born 1958), Greek-American academic
- Giorgos Sideris (born 1938), Greek footballer
- Nikolas Sideris (born 1977), Greek musician
- Nikos Sideris (born 1952), Greek psychiatrist

== Given name ==
- Sideris Tasiadis (born in 1990), German slalom canoeist

== See also ==
- Sideri
