= Cosmographia (Sebastian Münster) =

1544 book by Sebastian Münster

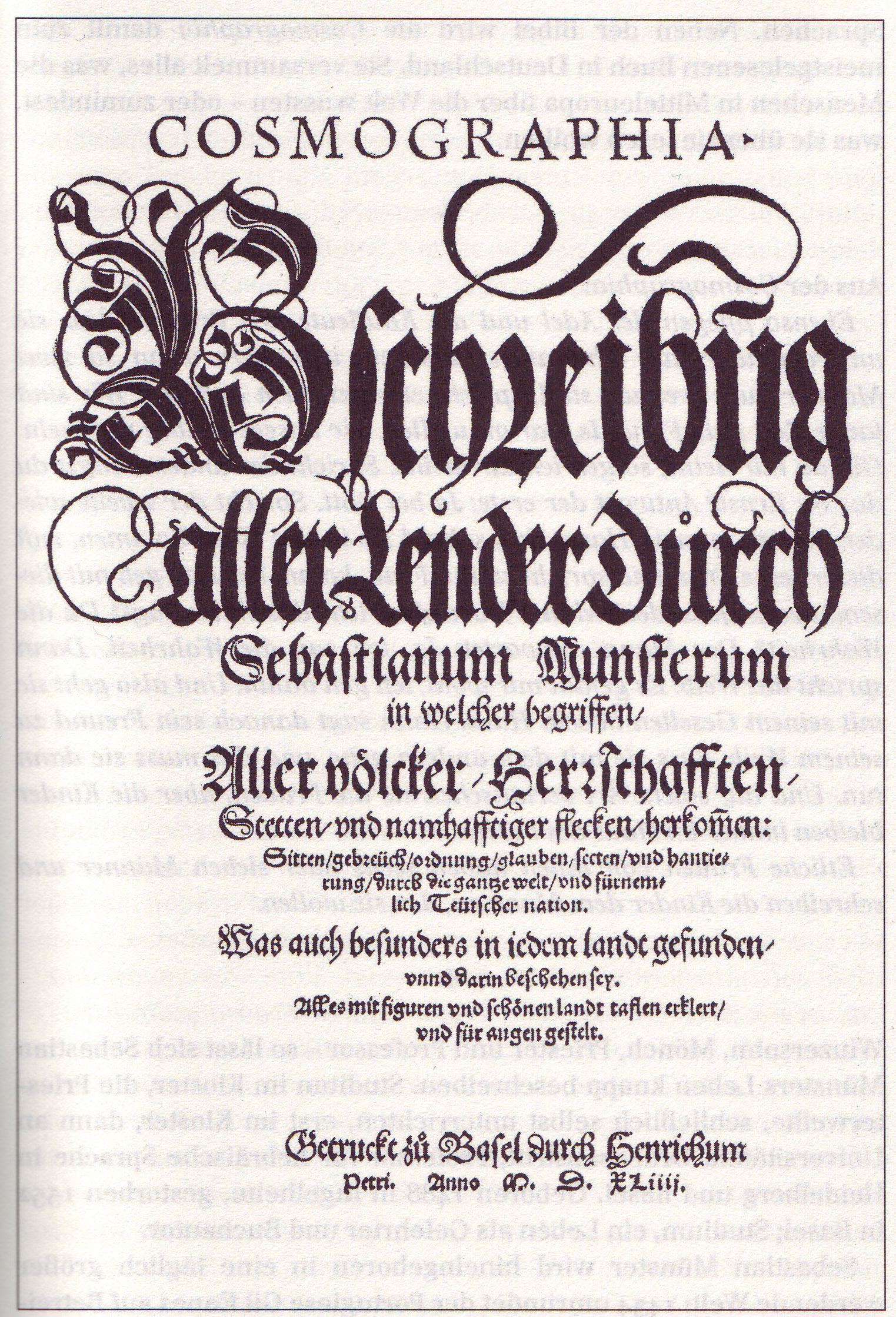
Title-page of first edition, printed in Basel by Heinrich Petri

The Cosmographia ("Cosmography") from 1544 by Sebastian Münster (1488–1552) is the earliest German-language description of the world.

It had numerous editions in different languages including Latin, French (translated by François de Belleforest), Italian and Czech. Only extracts have been translated into English. The last German edition was published in 1628, long after Munster's death. The Cosmographia was one of the most successful and popular books of the 16th century. It passed through 24 editions in 100 years. This success was due to the notable woodcuts (some by Hans Holbein the Younger, Urs Graf, Hans Rudolph Manuel Deutsch, and David Kandel). It was most important in reviving geography in 16th-century Europe. Among the notable maps within Cosmographia is the map "Tabula novarum insularum", which is credited as the first map to show the American continents as geographically discrete.

Some of its editions also contain one of the earliest preserved texts in the Latvian language.

Münster's earlier geographic works were Germania descriptio (1530) and Mappa Europae (1536). In 1540, he published a Latin edition of Ptolemy's Geographia with illustrations.

== Contents ==
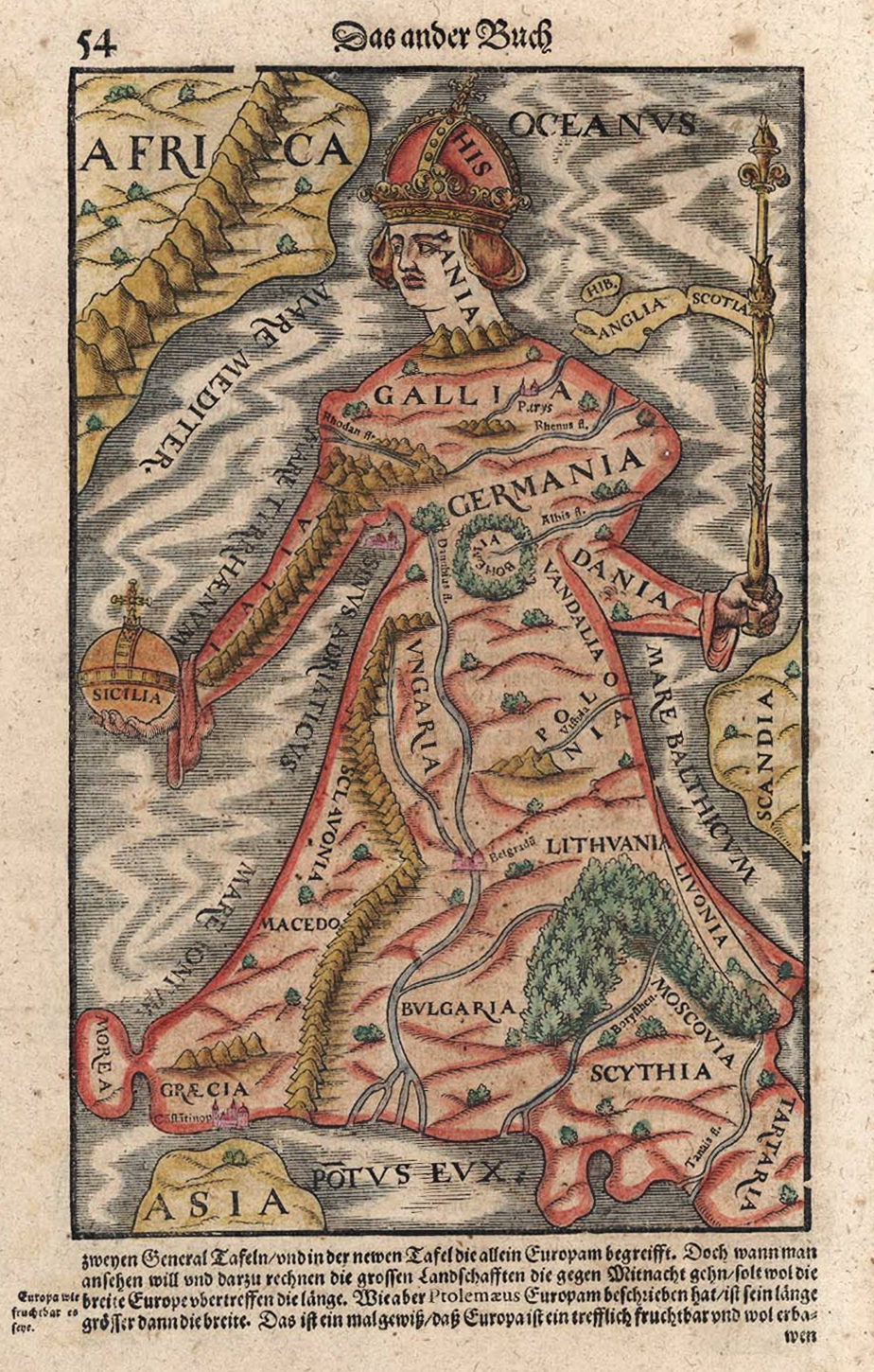
Europa regina in the 1570 Cosmographia

As late as the 1598 edition, the content consisted of:

Book I: Astronomy, Mathematics, Physical Geography, Cartography
Book II: England, Scotland, Ireland, Spain, France, Belgium, The Netherlands, Luxembourg, Savoy, Trier, Italy
Book III: Germany, Alsace, Switzerland, Austria, Carniola, Istria, Bohemia, Moravia, Silesia, Pomerania, Prussia, Livland
Book IV: Denmark, Norway, Sweden, Finland, Iceland, Hungary, Poland, Lithuania, Russia, Walachia, Bosnia, Bulgaria, Serbia, Greece, Turkey
Book V: Asia Minor, Cyprus, Armenia, Palestine, Arabia, Persia, Central Asia, Afghanistan, Scythia, Tartary, India, Ceylon, Burma, China, East Indies, Madagascar, Zanzibar, America
Book VI: Mauritania, Tunisia, Libya, Egypt, Senegal, Gambia, Mali, South Africa, East Africa

== Editions ==
- German: 1544 Basel, 1545 Basel, 1546, 1548, 1550, 1553, 1556, 1558, 1561, 1564, 1567, 1569, 1572, 1574, 1578, 1588, 1592, 1598, 1614, 1628
- Latin: 1550 Basel, 1552, 1554, 1559, 1572
- French: 1552 Basel, 1556, 1560, 1565, 1568, 1575 Paris (editor Francois de Belleforest).
- Italian: 1558 Basel, undated Venezia, 1575 Koln.
- Czech: 1554 Praha.

Excerpts only:

- German: 1820 J.G.J. Seybold, Munchen.
- French: 1779 Ruault, Paris (ed. Nicolas Gobet); 1872 Librarie des Philosophes, Paris; 1883 A. Quantin, Paris.
- English: 1552 W. Marshall, London (abridged ed.); 1553 Edward Sutton, London (ed. Richard Eden); 1561 Lahon Awdely, London (ed. George North); 1572 Thomas Marche, London (ed. Richard Eden); 1574 Thomas Marche, London (ed. Richard Eden); 1577 Richard Jugge, London (ed. Richard Eden); 1885 Turnbull & Spears, Edinburgh & Birmingham (ed. Edward Arber); 1895 A. Constable & Co., Westminster (ed. Edward Arber).

== Gallery ==
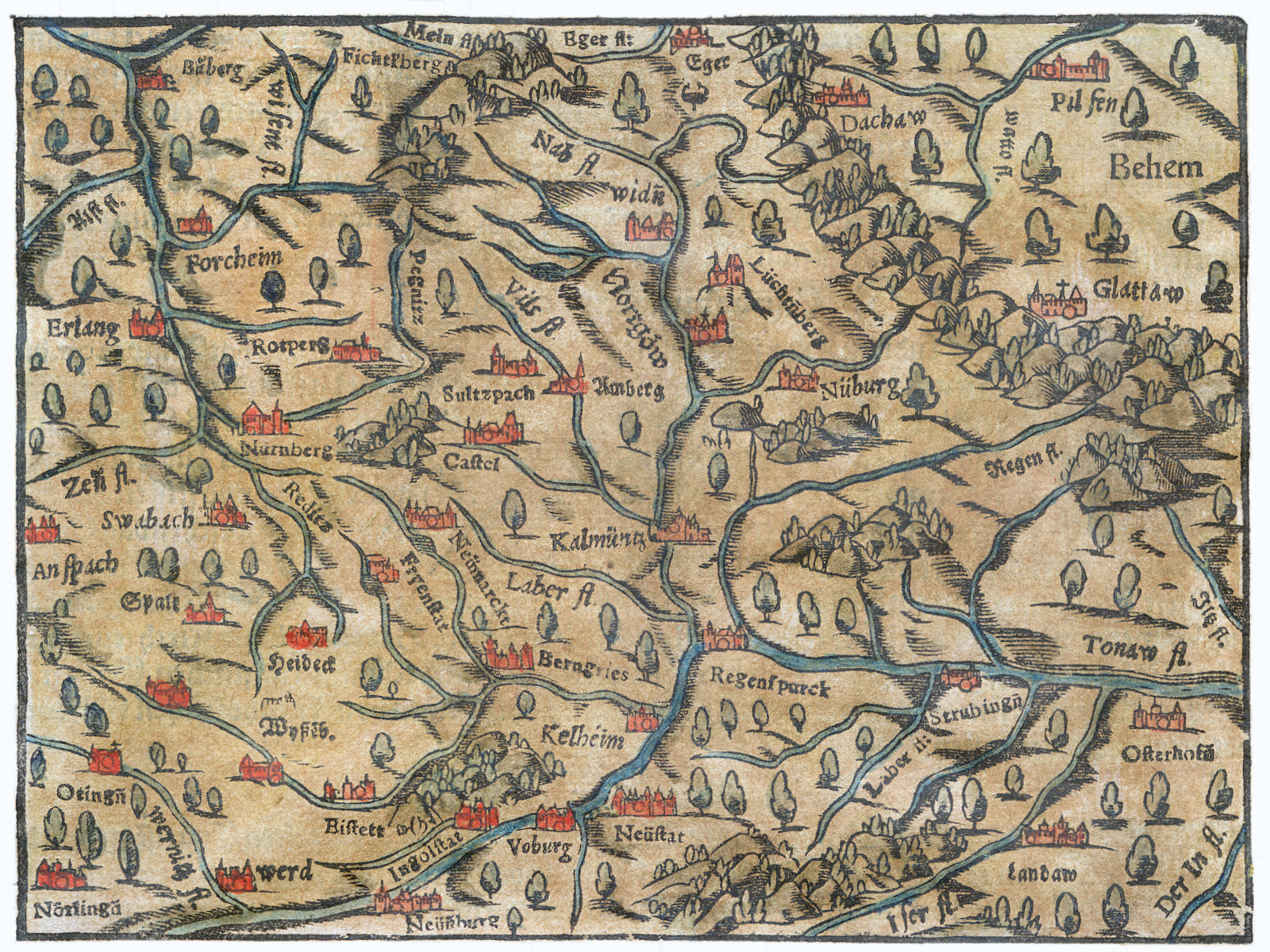
Map of the Bavarian Nordgau

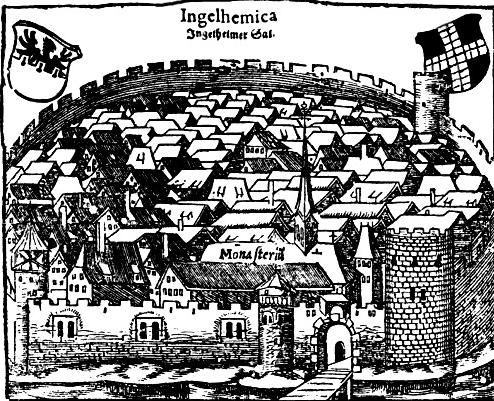
Ingelheim

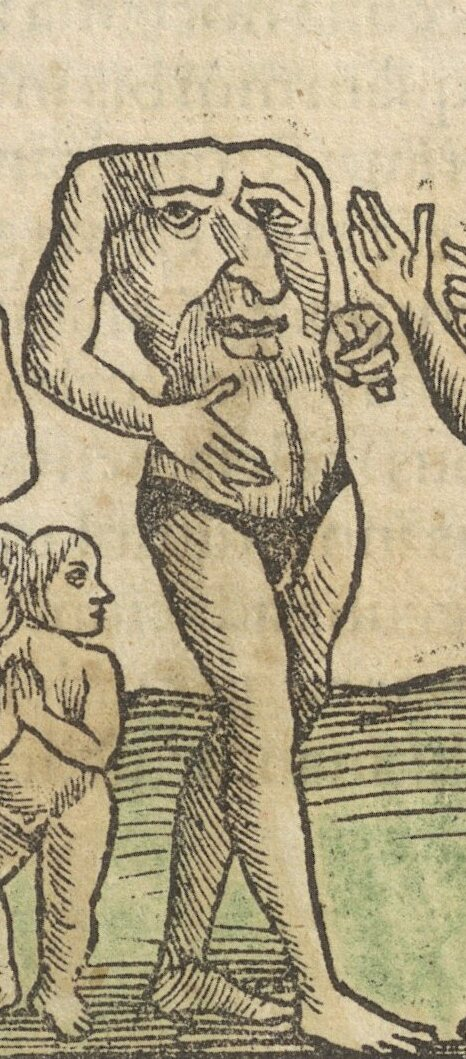
Blemmye, a fantastic creature

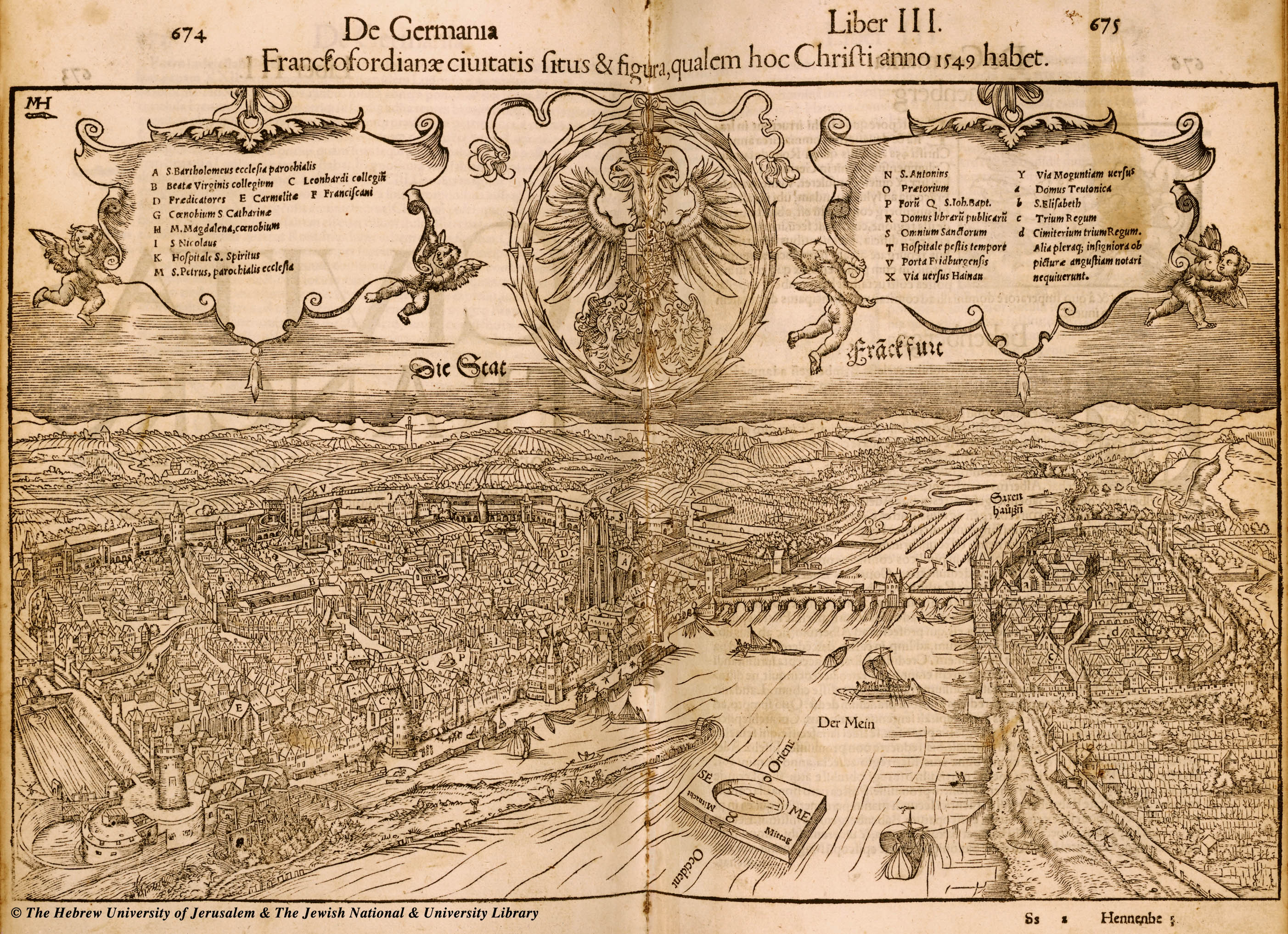
Frankfurt (Main)

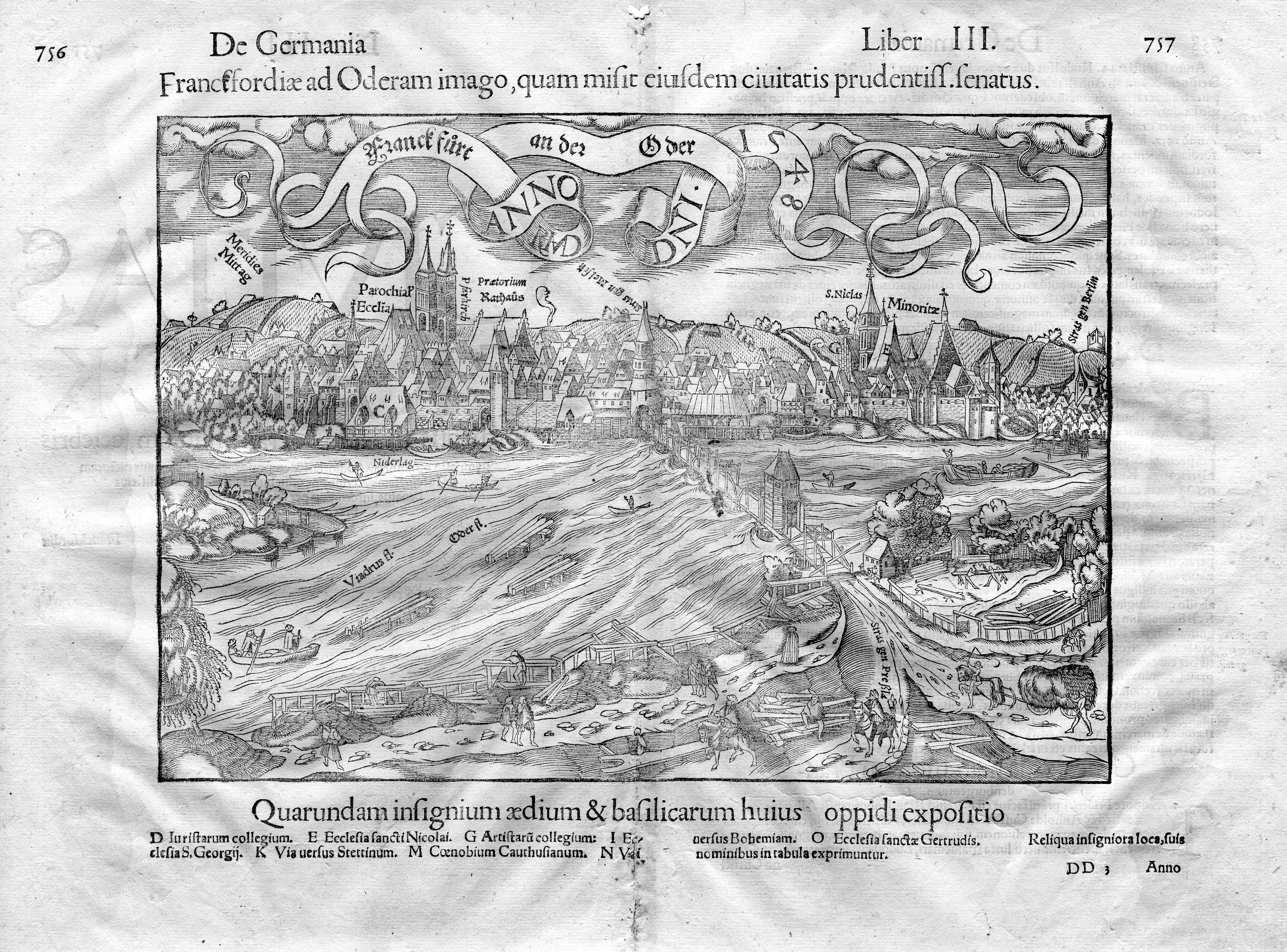
Frankfurt (Oder)

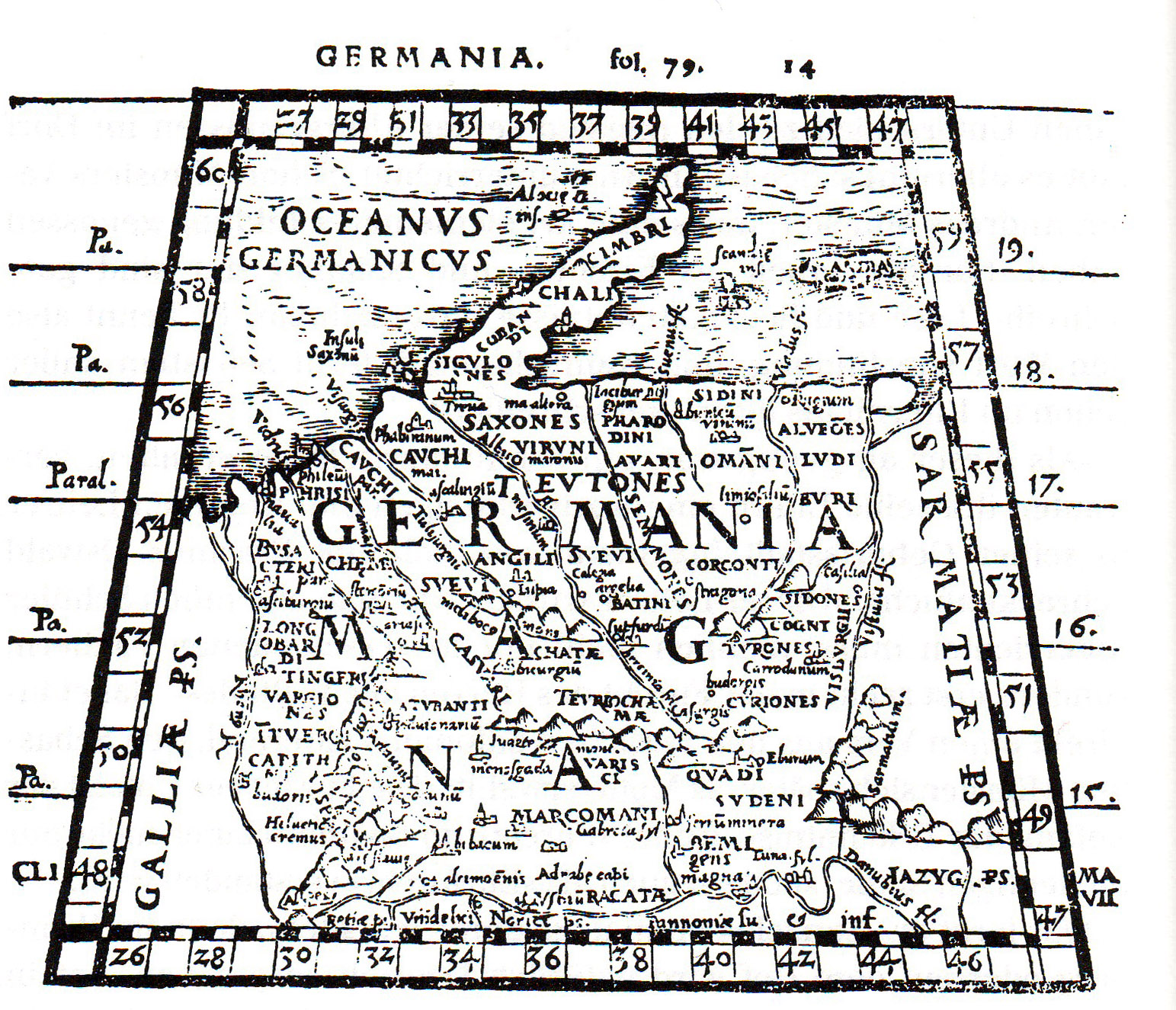
Map of Germany

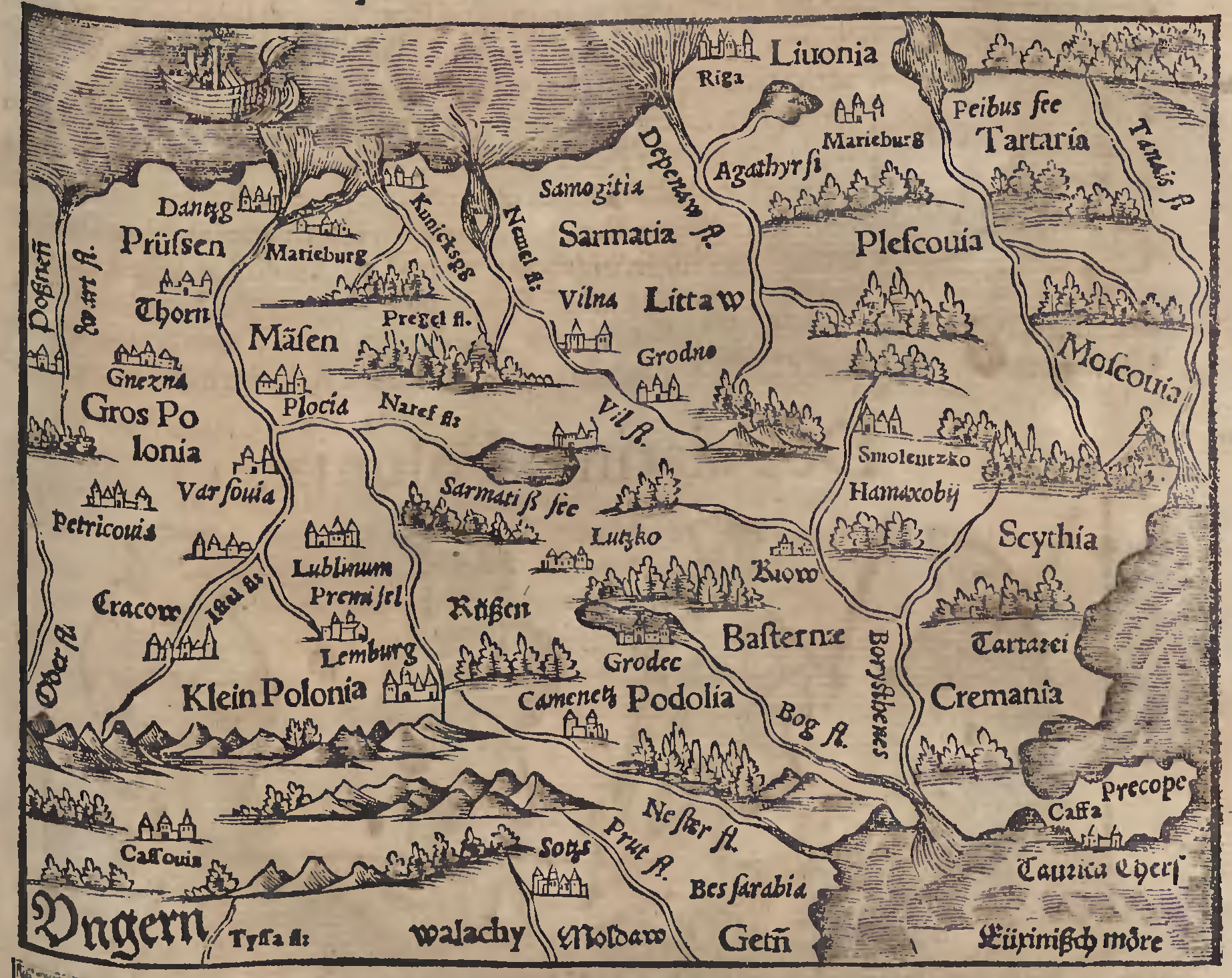
Map of central and eastern Europe

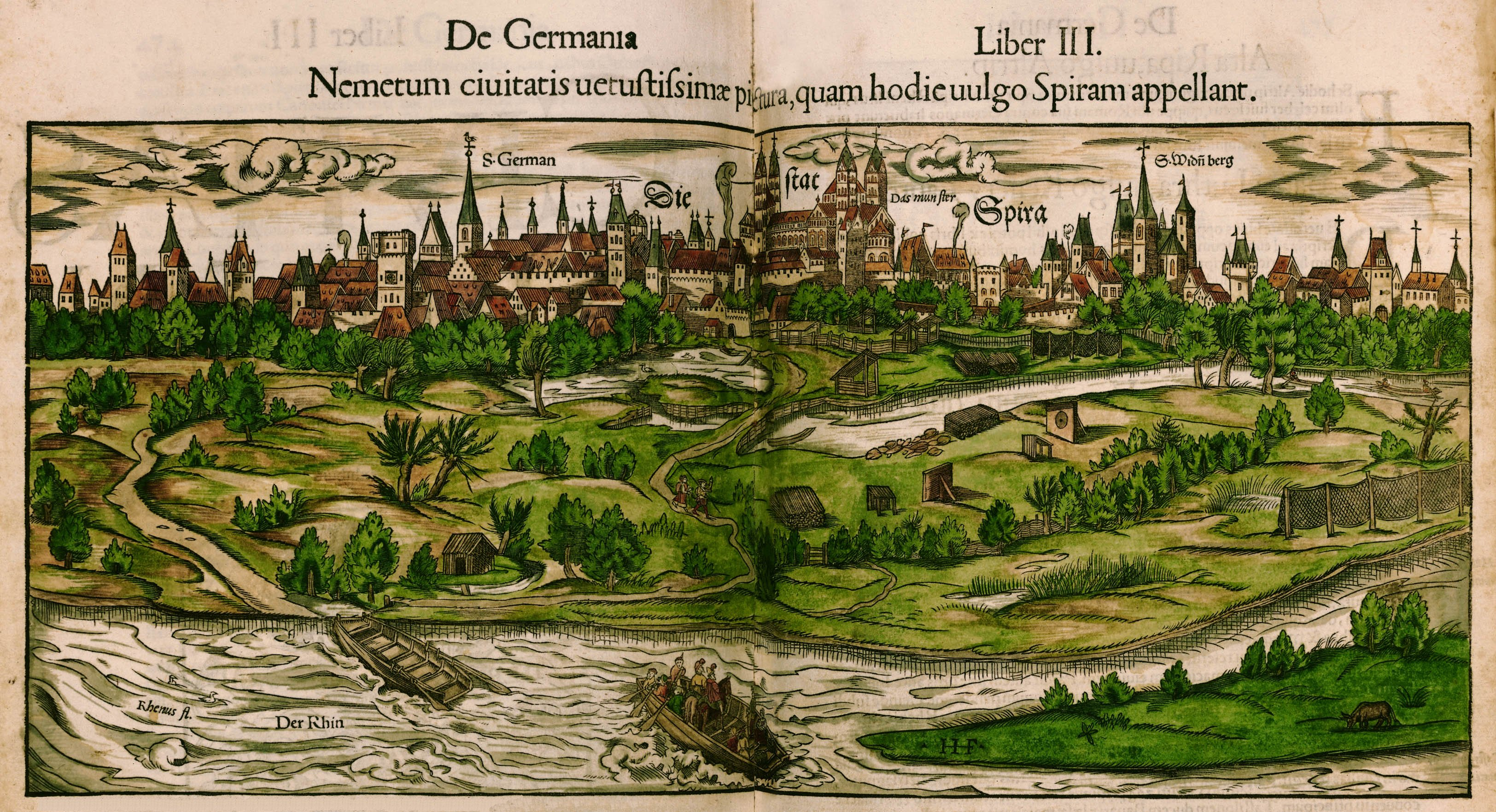
Speyer

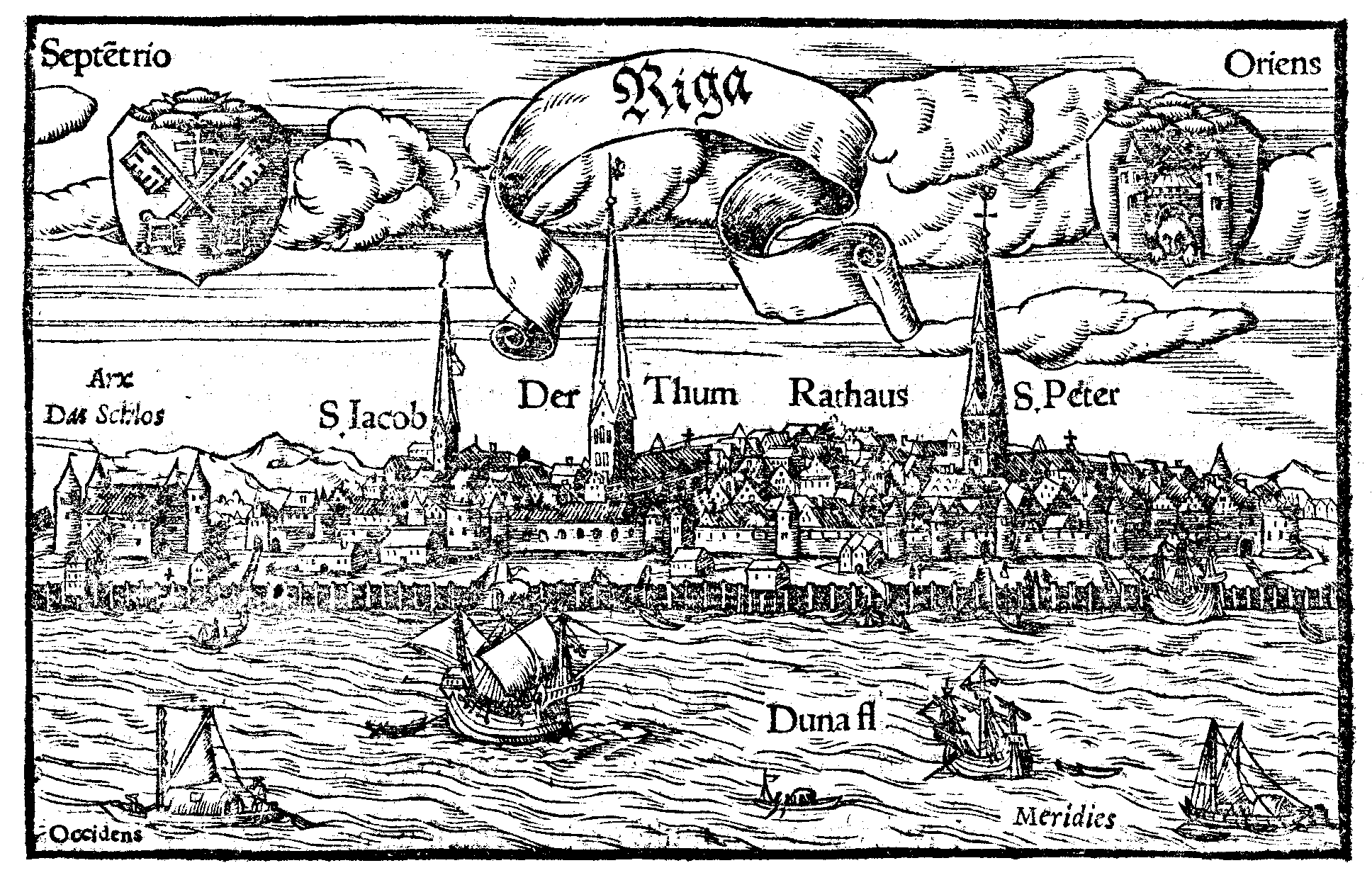
Skyline of Riga

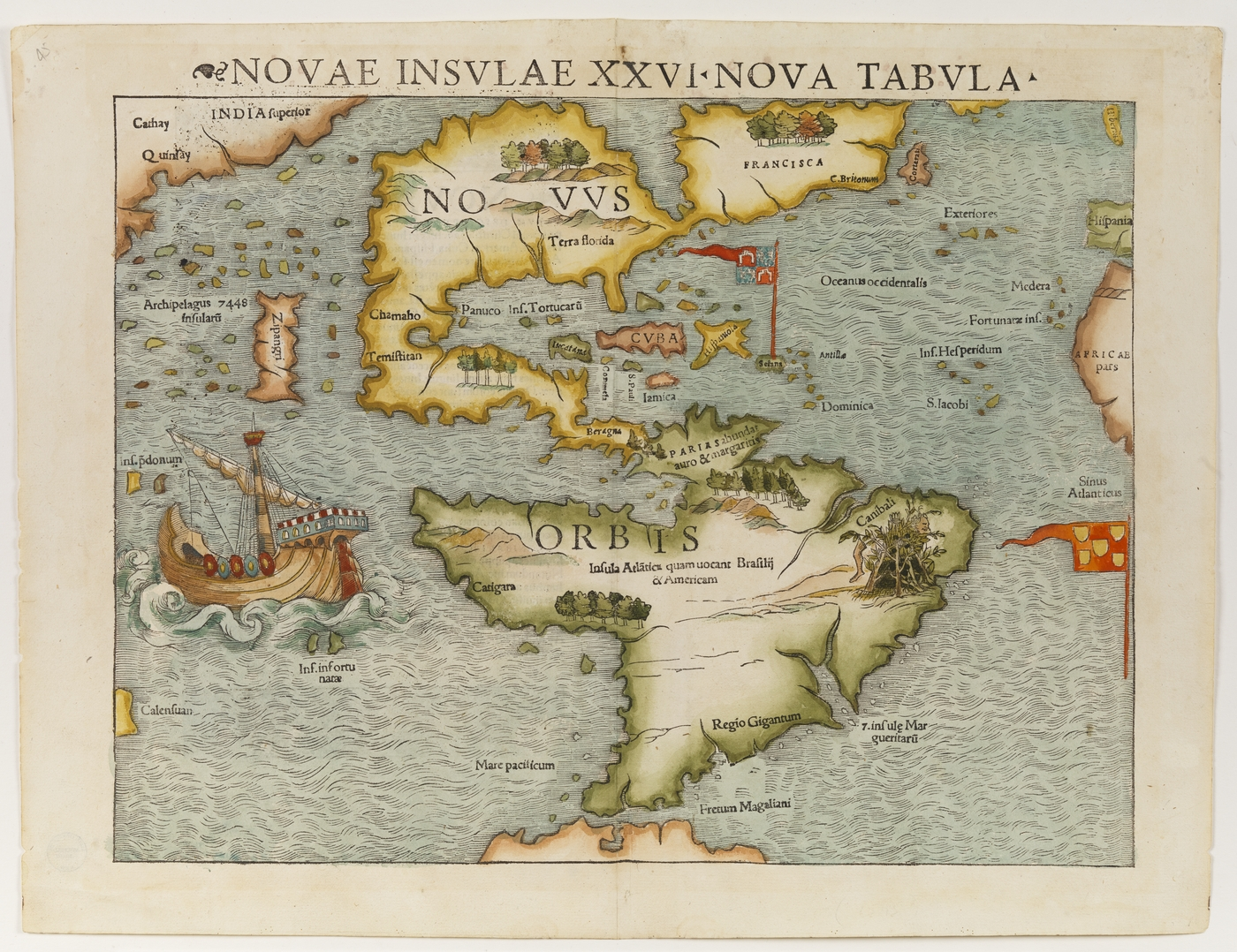
Map of showing North and South America, or the 'New World'
