= Sideri =

Surname list

Sideri is a surname. Notable people with the surname include:

- Cornelia Sideri (1938–2017), Romanian sprint canoer
- Giorgio Sideri (fl. 1537–1565), Cretan geographer
- Ion Sideri (born 1937), Romanian sprint canoer

== See also ==
- Sideris
