= Hieronymus Bock =

German botanist (1497/98–1554)

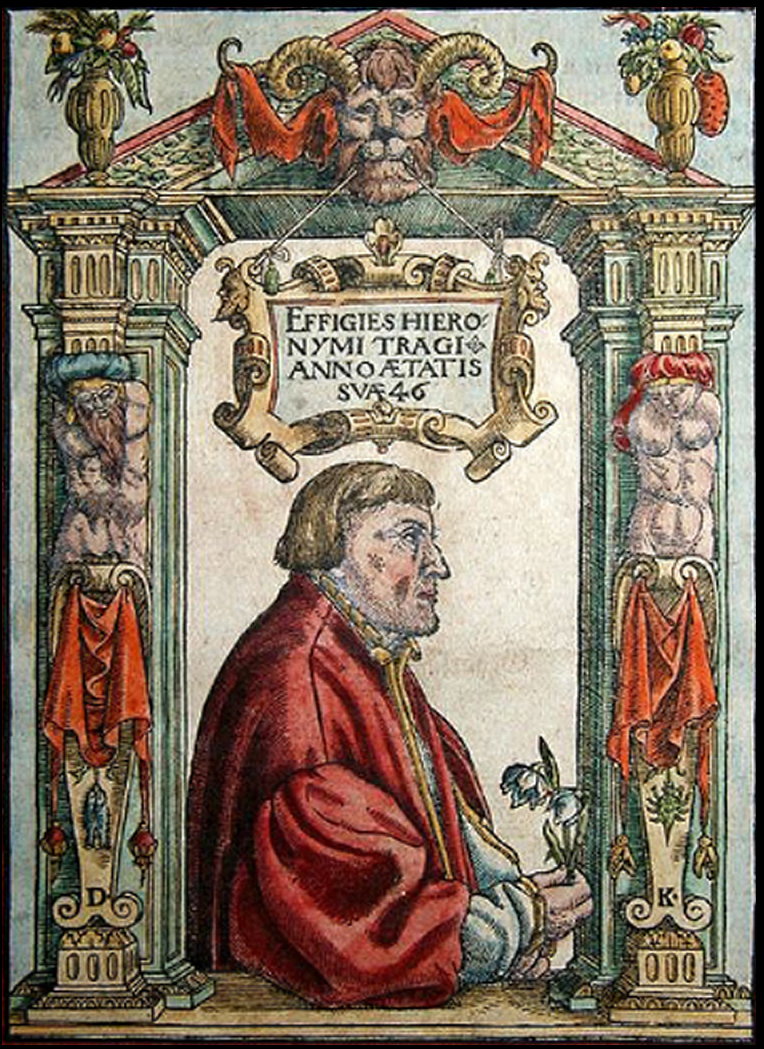
- Born: 1497/98
- Died: 21 February 1554; Hornbach, Zweibrücken-Bitsch, Holy Roman Empire (in modern Rhineland-Palatinate, Germany)
- Spouse: Eva Victor
- Church: Lutheran

Hieronymus Bock (Latinised Hieronymus Tragus; c. 1498 – 21 February 1554) was a German botanist, physician, and Lutheran minister who began the transition from medieval botany to the modern scientific worldview by arranging plants by their relation or resemblance. The standard author abbreviation H.Bock is used to indicate this person as the author when citing a botanical name.

== Life ==
The details of his life are unclear. In 1519 he inscribed at the university of Heidelberg. He married Eva Victor in 1523, and was schoolteacher in Zweibrücken for nine years. He became the prince's physician and caretaker of the kitchen garden of the count palatine and in 1533 received a life-time position as a Lutheran minister in nearby Hornbach where he stayed up to his death in 1554.

His surname was translated into Latin as Tragus; Bock is German for "male goat," while τράγος (tragos) is Ancient Greek for the same. The first edition of his Kreutterbuch (literally "plant book") appeared in 1539 unillustrated; his stated objectives were to describe German plants, including their names, characteristics, and medical uses. Instead of following Dioscorides as was traditional, he developed his own system to classify 700 plants. Bock apparently traveled widely through the German region observing the plants for himself, since he includes ecological and distributional observations.

His 1546 Kreutterbuch ("herbal") was illustrated by the artist David Kandel.

In the wine world, Bock is noted for having the first documented use of the modern word Riesling in 1552 when it was mentioned in his Latin herbal. Bock's description of oak apples is noted in the entomologists data base.

The grass genus Tragus (by Haller in 1768) and the spurge genera of Tragia (Plum. ex L. in 1753) and Tragiella (by Pax & K.Hoffm. in 1919) are all named after him.

== Works ==
- New Kreuterbuch von Underscheidt, Würckung und Namen der Kreuter, so in teutschen Landen wachsen. Straßburg, 1546 Digital edition by the University and State Library Düsseldorf
