= Hans Rudolf Manuel Deutsch =

16th century Swiss painter

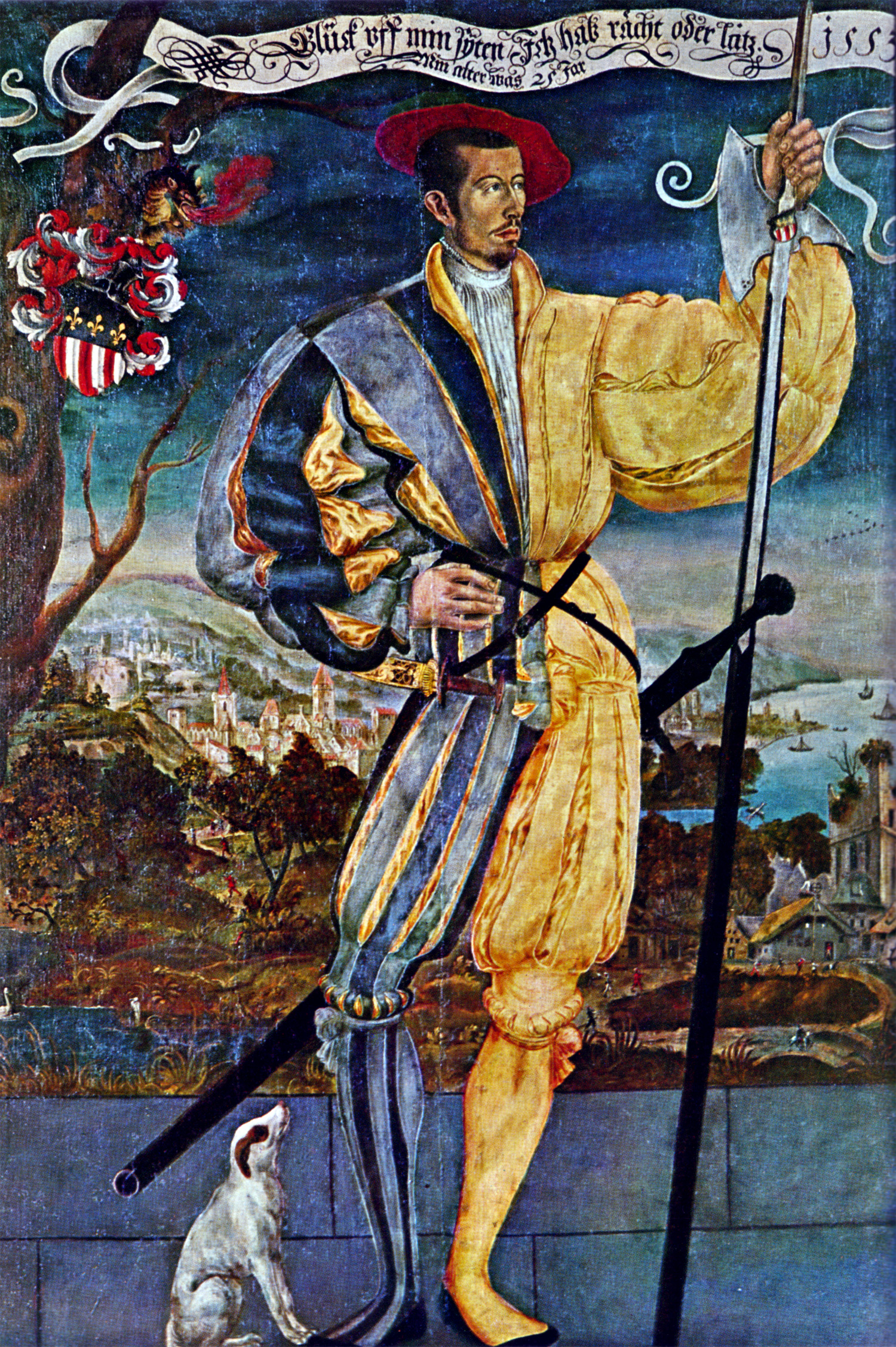
Oil painting, depicting his brother Niklaus

Hans Rudolf Manuel Deutsch (1525–1571) was a Swiss artist. He made several of the woodcuts for De re metallica (the metals and mining treatise by Georgius Agricola, the "father of mineralogy") and for Sebastian Münster's Cosmographia (the widely circulated encyclopedic book published in 24 editions in several languages between 1544 and 1628).

Deutsch's father, Niklaus Manuel Deutsch (the Elder) and his brother Niklaus were also artists. The older Niklaus had taken the last name "Manuel", but all three also commonly used "Deutsch" as part of their names and signed their paintings with initials ending in "D".

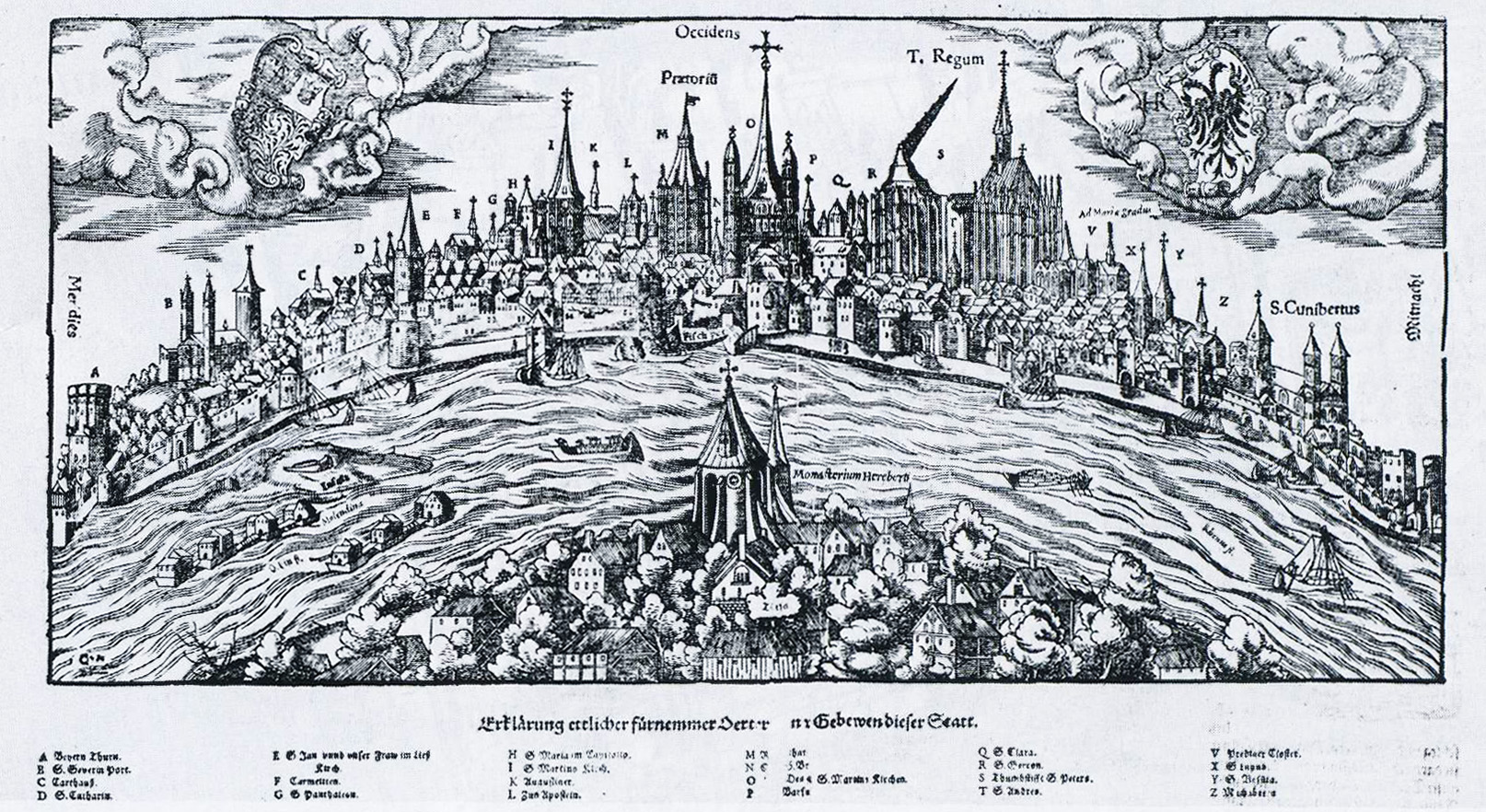
Panorama of the Rhine at Cologne, 1548
