= David Kandel =

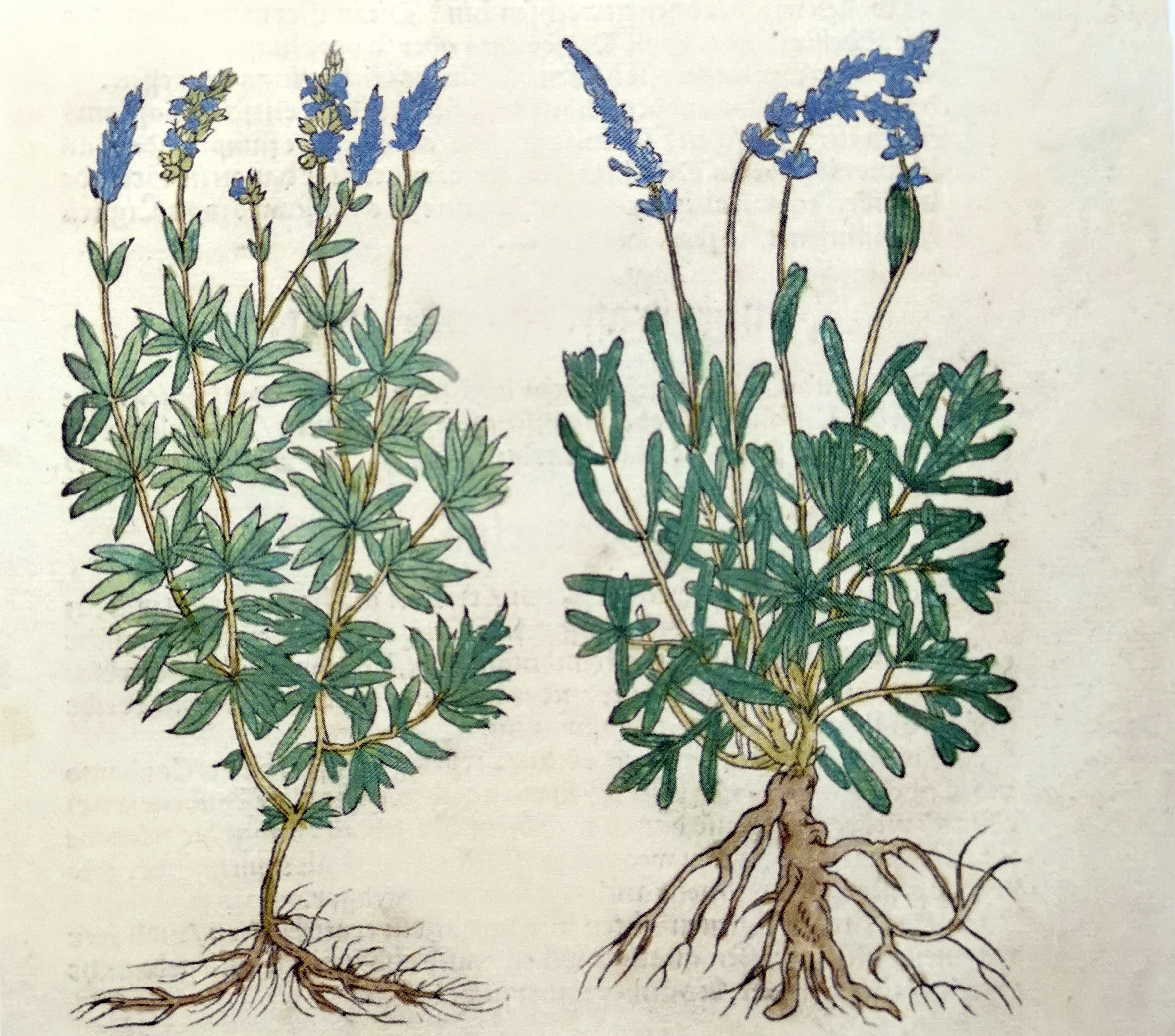
Two Lavandula species from Hieronymus Bock's 'Kreuterbuch'

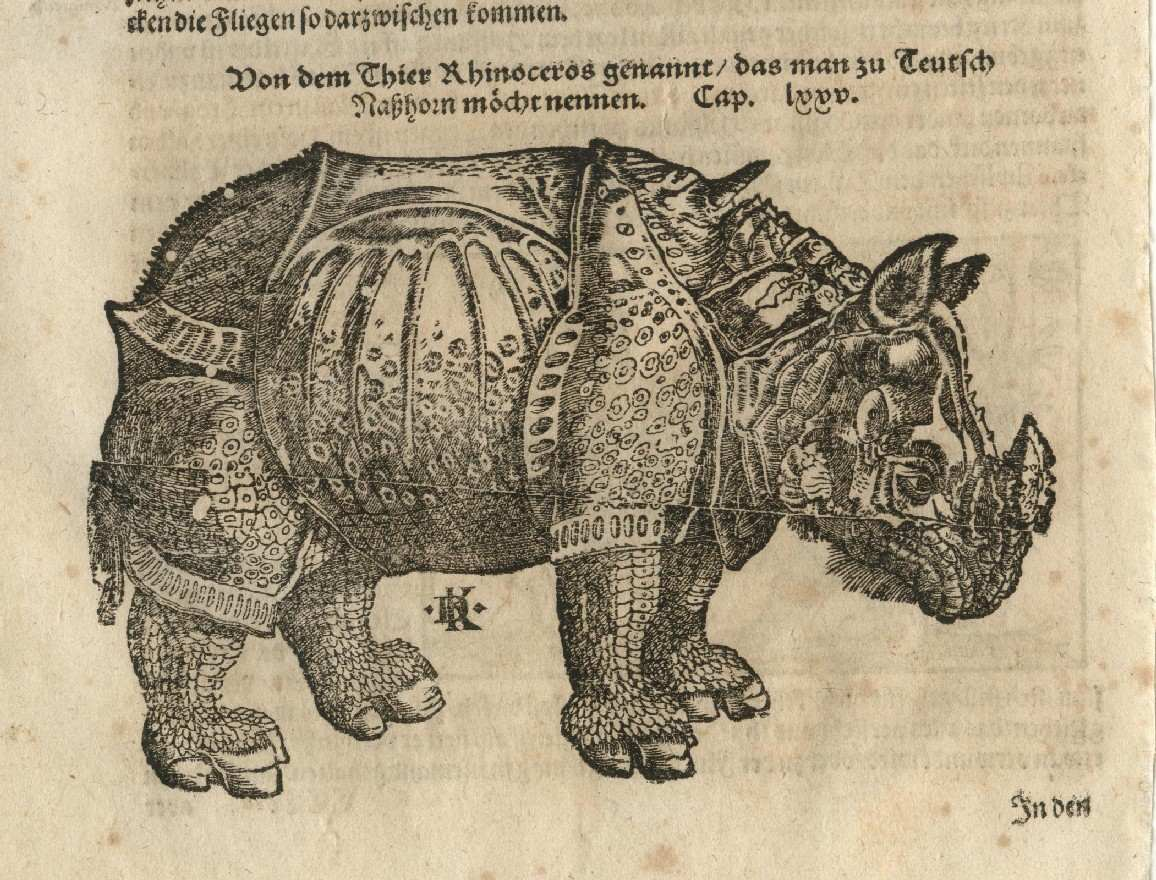
"The “Rhinoceros" woodcut (34 × 20.5 cm or 11.8×8.0 inches) by David Kandel, published in Sebastian Münster's “Cosmographia” of 1598. The obvious resemblance with Dürer's Rhinoceros is quite clear. (From Dr. Nuno Carvalho de Sousa Private Collections - Lisbon)

David Kandel (1520–1592) was a Renaissance artist and one of the pioneers of botanical and natural history illustration. Very little is known of his personal life.

== Biography ==
He was probably born in Strasbourg, in 1520. He married in 1554 and 33 years later, in 1587, was recorded as "owner of a house". He died in 1592. His works and woodcuts are diverse in subject, from botanical illustrations to biblical events.

The Kreuterbuch (or “The Book of the Herbs”), by Hieronymus Bock, used woodcuts of a quality far ahead of its time. Commissioned by Bock, Kandel contributed some 550 woodcuts to the second edition published in 1546.

The woodcut “Rhinoceros”, for the work Cosmographia (or “Cosmography”) by Sebastian Munster, is based on the Dürer sketch.
