= Sebastian Münster =

German cartographer, cosmographer, and scholar (1488–1552)

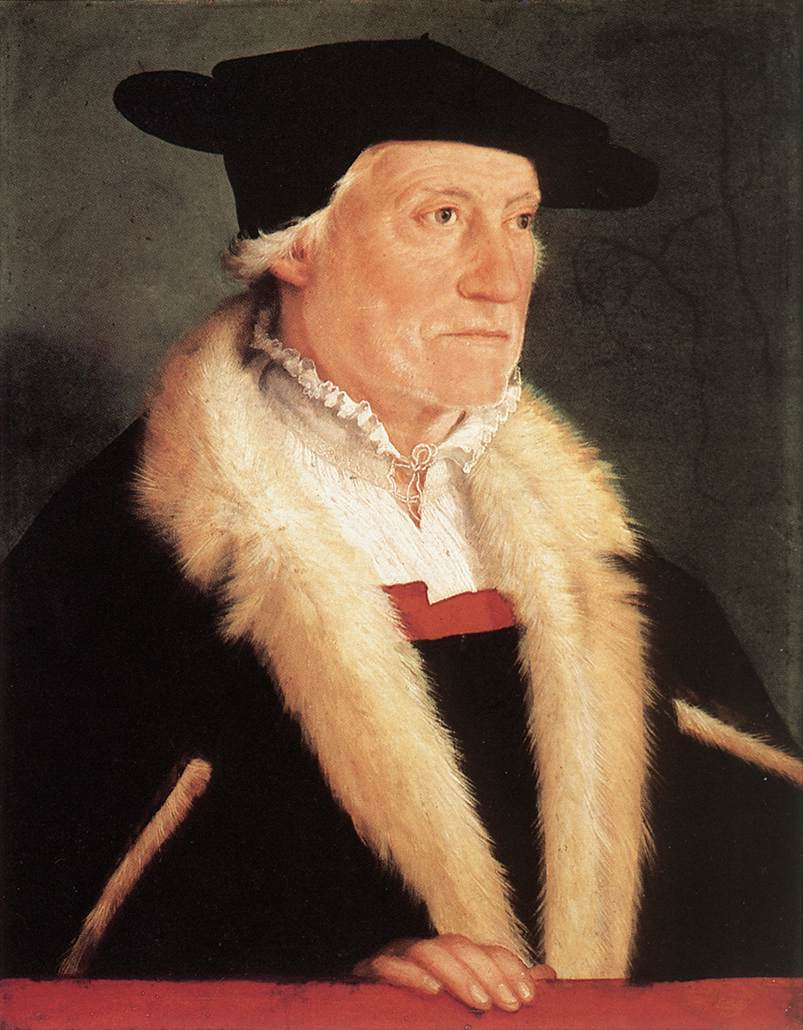
Portrait of Sebastian Münster by Christoph Amberger, c. 1552

Sebastian Münster (20 January 1488 – 26 May 1552) was a German cartographer and cosmographer. He also was a Christian Hebraist scholar who taught as a professor at the University of Basel. His well-known work, the highly accurate world map, Cosmographia, sold well and went through 24 editions. Its influence was widely spread by a production of woodcuts created of it by a variety of artists.

== Life ==
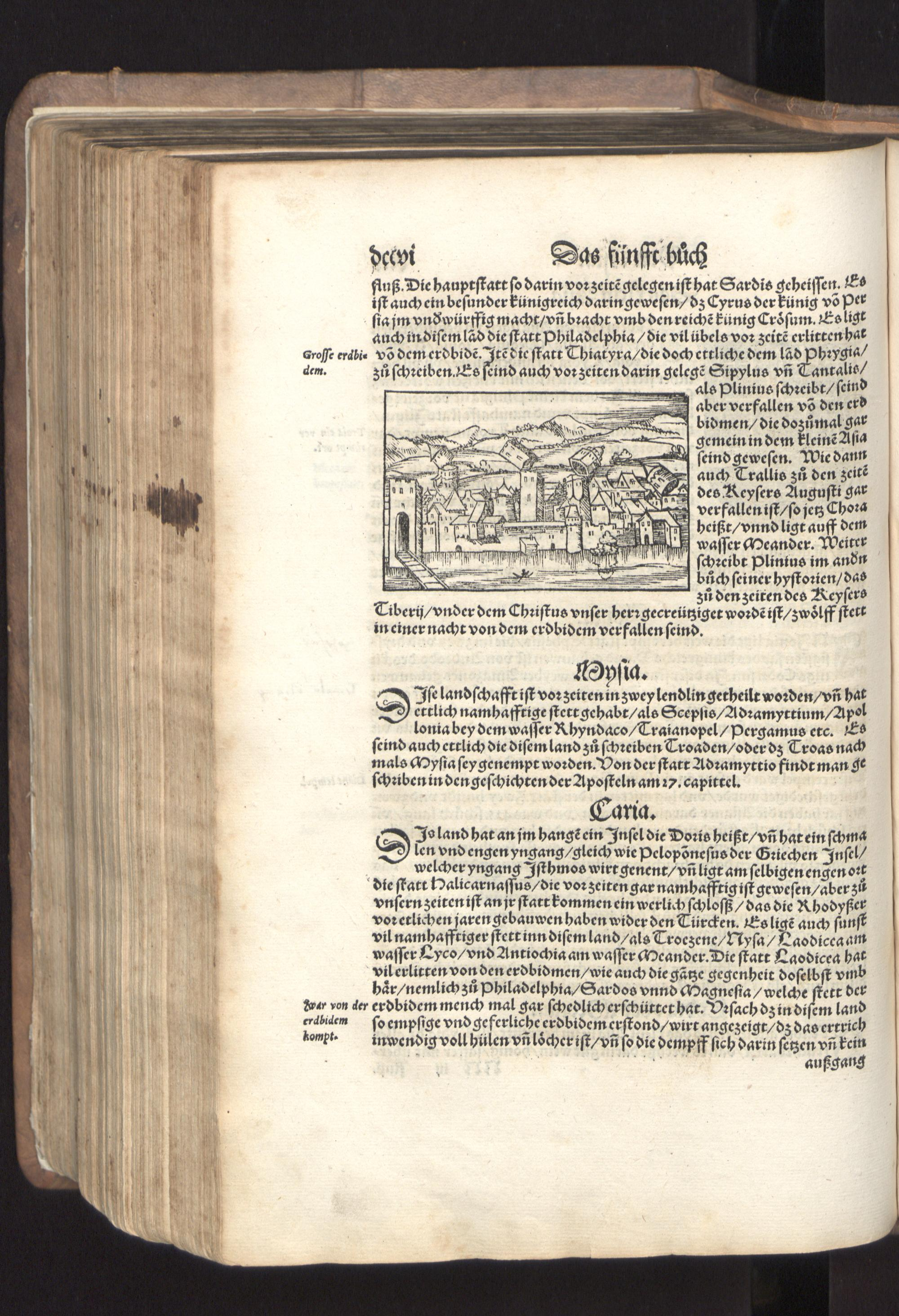
Münster's Cosmographia

He was born in Ingelheim, near Mainz, the son of Andreas Münster. His parents and other ancestors were farmers.

In 1505, he entered the Franciscan order. Four years later, he entered a monastery where he became a student of Konrad Pellikan for five years. Münster completed his studies at the University of Tübingen in 1518. His graduate adviser was Johannes Stöffler.

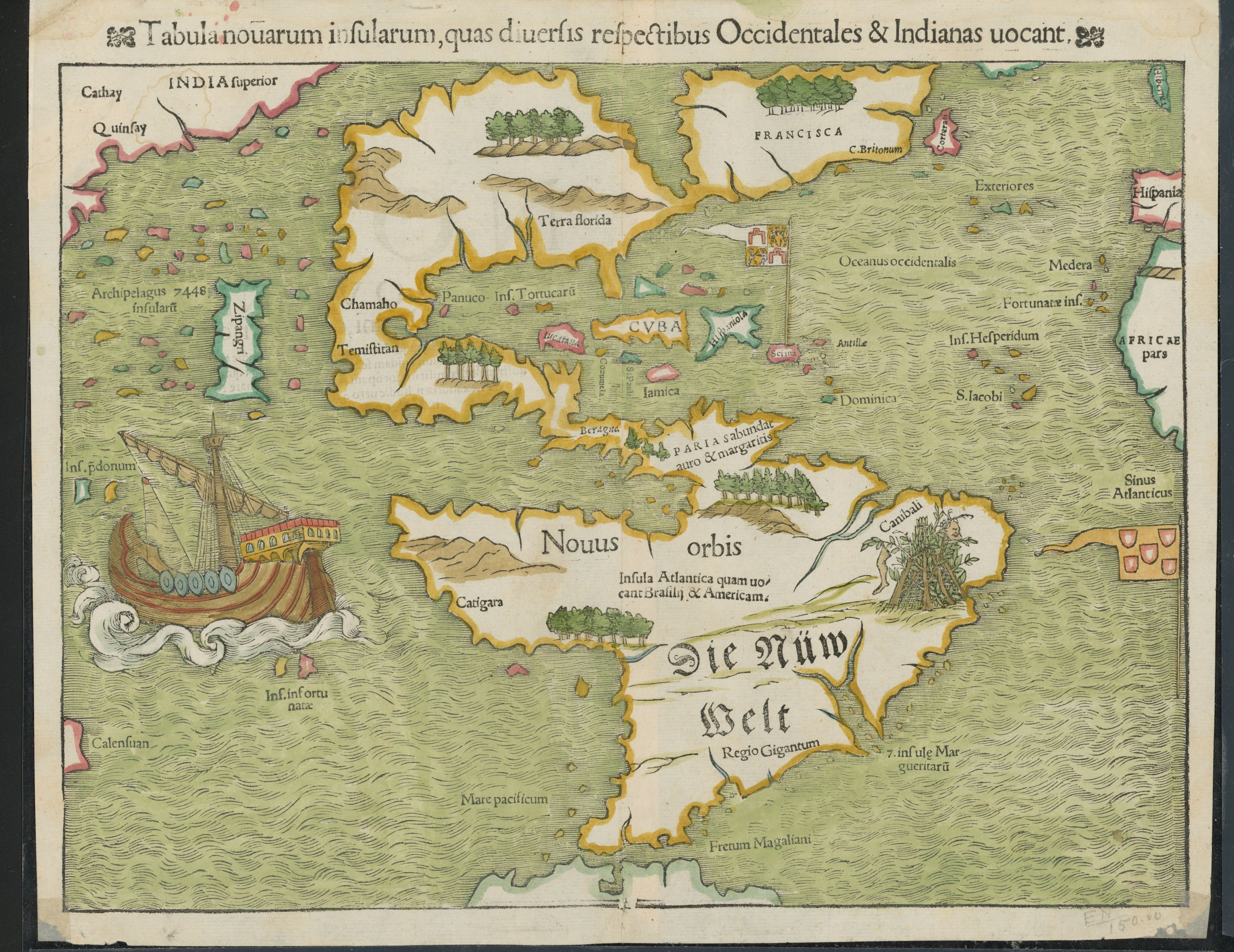
Tabula Novarum Insularum, 1540

He left the Franciscans for the Lutheran Church in order to accept an appointment at the Reformed Church-dominated University of Basel in 1529. He had long harboured an interest in Lutheranism, and during the German Peasants' War, as a monk, he had been repeatedly attacked. A professor of Hebrew, and a disciple of Elias Levita, he edited the Hebrew Bible (2 vols. fol., Basel, 1534–1535), accompanied by a Latin translation and a large number of annotations. He was the first German to produce an edition of the Hebrew Bible.

He published more than one Hebrew grammar, and was the first to prepare a Grammatica Chaldaica (Basel, 1527). His lexicographical labours included a Dictionarium Chaldaicum (1527), and a Dictionarium trilingue for Latin, Greek, and Hebrew in 1530.

He released a Mappa Europae (map of Europe) in 1536. In 1537, he published a Rabbinical translation of the Gospel of Matthew in Hebrew which he had obtained from Spanish Conversos. In 1540 he published a Latin edition of Ptolemy's Geographia with illustrations. The 1550 edition contains cities, portraits, and costumes. These editions, printed in Germany, are the most valued of this work. Other writings that followed are Horologiographia (a treatise on dialling – constructing sundials, Basel, 1531), and Organum Uranicum (a treatise on the planetary motions, 1536).

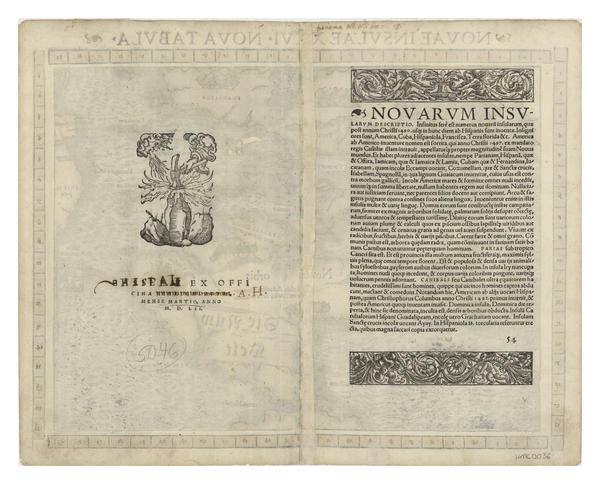
Novae lnsulae XXVI Nova Tabula (1552)

His Cosmographia of 1544 was the earliest description of the world in the German language. It had numerous editions in different languages including Latin, French, Italian, English, and even Czech. The Cosmographia was one of the most successful and popular works of the 16th century. It passed through 24 editions in 100 years. This success was due to the fascinating woodcuts (some by Hans Holbein the Younger, Urs Graf, Hans Rudolph Manuel Deutsch, and David Kandel), in addition to including the first to introduce "separate maps for each of the four continents known then – America, Africa, Asia and Europe." It was most important in reviving geography in 16th-century Europe. The last German edition was published in 1628, long after his death.

Münster was also known as translator of the Hebrew Bible (Hebraica Biblia). His edition was published in two volumes (1546) in Basel. The first volume contains the books from Genesis to 2 Kings, following the order of the Masoretic codices. The second volume contains The Prophets (Major and Minor), The Psalms, Job, Proverb, Daniel, Chronicles, and the Five Scrolls (The Song of Songs, Ruth, Lamentations, Ecclesiastes and Esther).

He died at Basel of the plague in 1552. Münster's tombstone describes him as the Ezra and the Strabo of the German people.

== Selected works ==
- Grammatica Chaldaica (1527)
- Dictionarium trilingue (1530), for Latin, Greek, and Hebrew
- de astrologia Chaldaeorum (1537), a treatise on Babylonian astronomy
- Geographia (1540), Latin edition of Ptolemy's Geography, which Münster edited and supplemented with his own commentaries. The tabulae maps that were used to accompany it provided some of the most accurate depictions of the world at the time.
- Cosmographia (1544), Münster's most famous work and a detailed description of the world.
- Hebraica Biblia (1546)
- Rudimenta Mathematica (1551)

== Gallery ==
Several paintings with oil on canvas, woodcuts and copper etchings depict Sebastian Münster, by Hans Holbein d. J. (Basel, c. 1530), Willem de Haen (1615), as rector of the University of Basel (by Christoph Amberger, um 1547), and on the 100-DM-bill as used from 1962 to 1991.

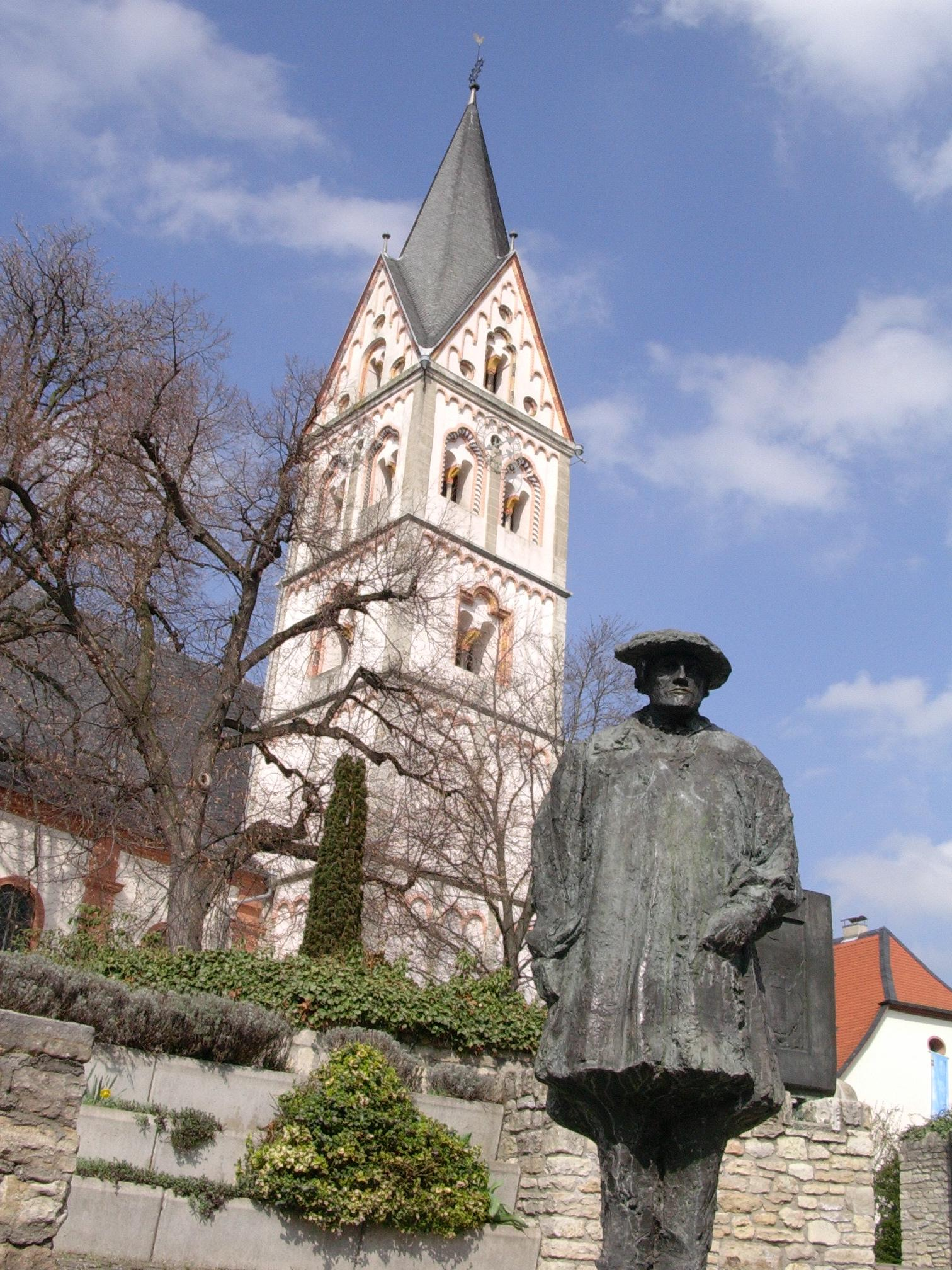
Statue of Sebastian Münster in front of St. Remigius Church, Ingelheim

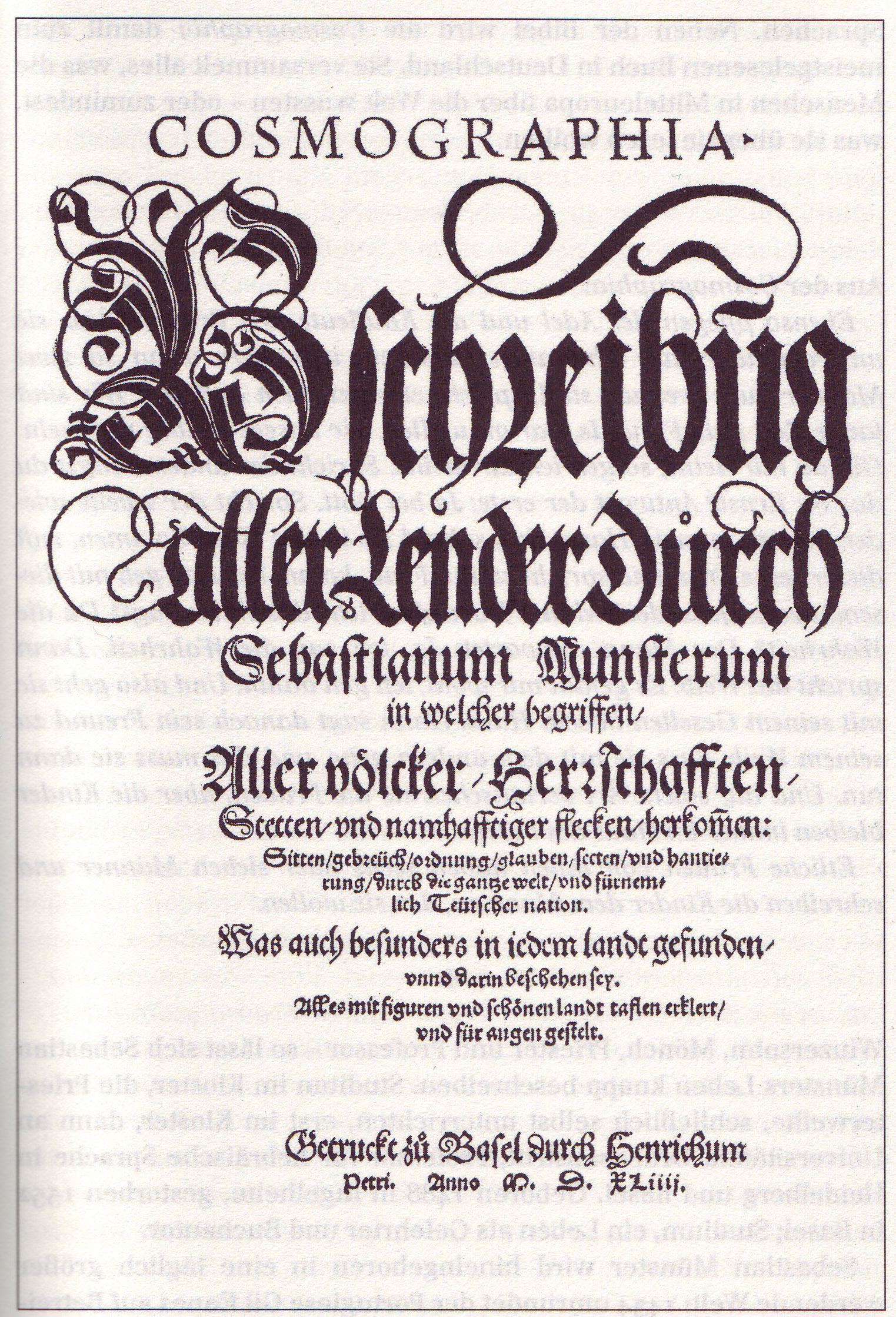
Cover of first edition of Cosmographia

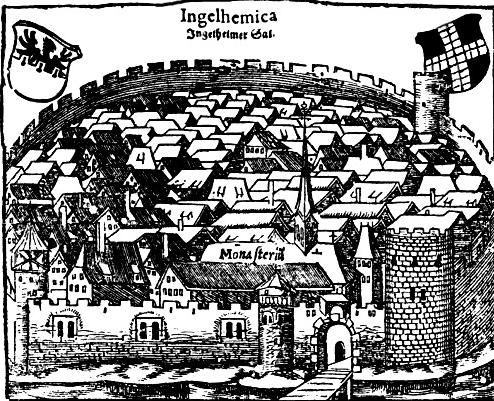
His home town Ingelheim in Cosmographia

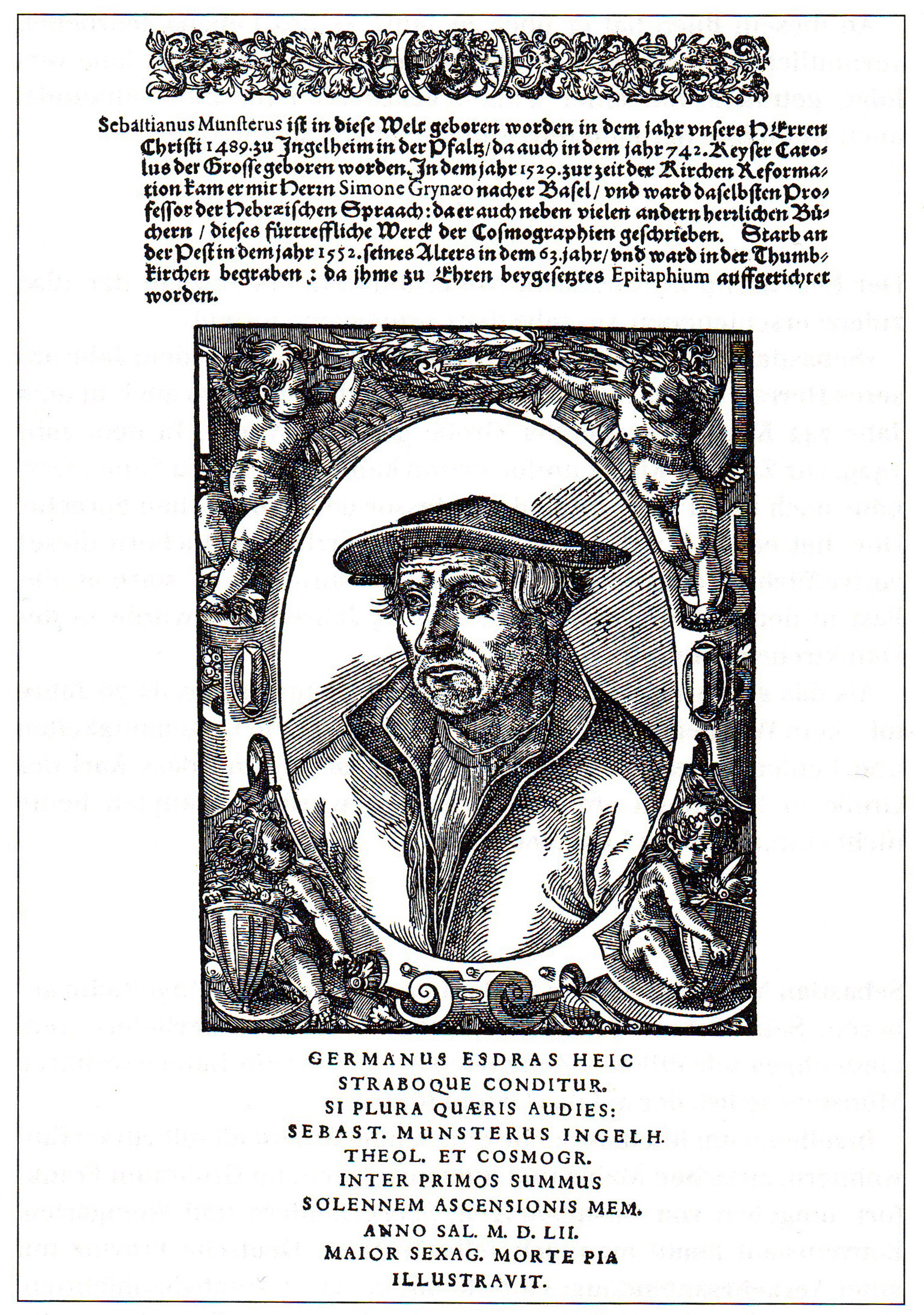
Portrait of Sebastian Münster, edition of 1628

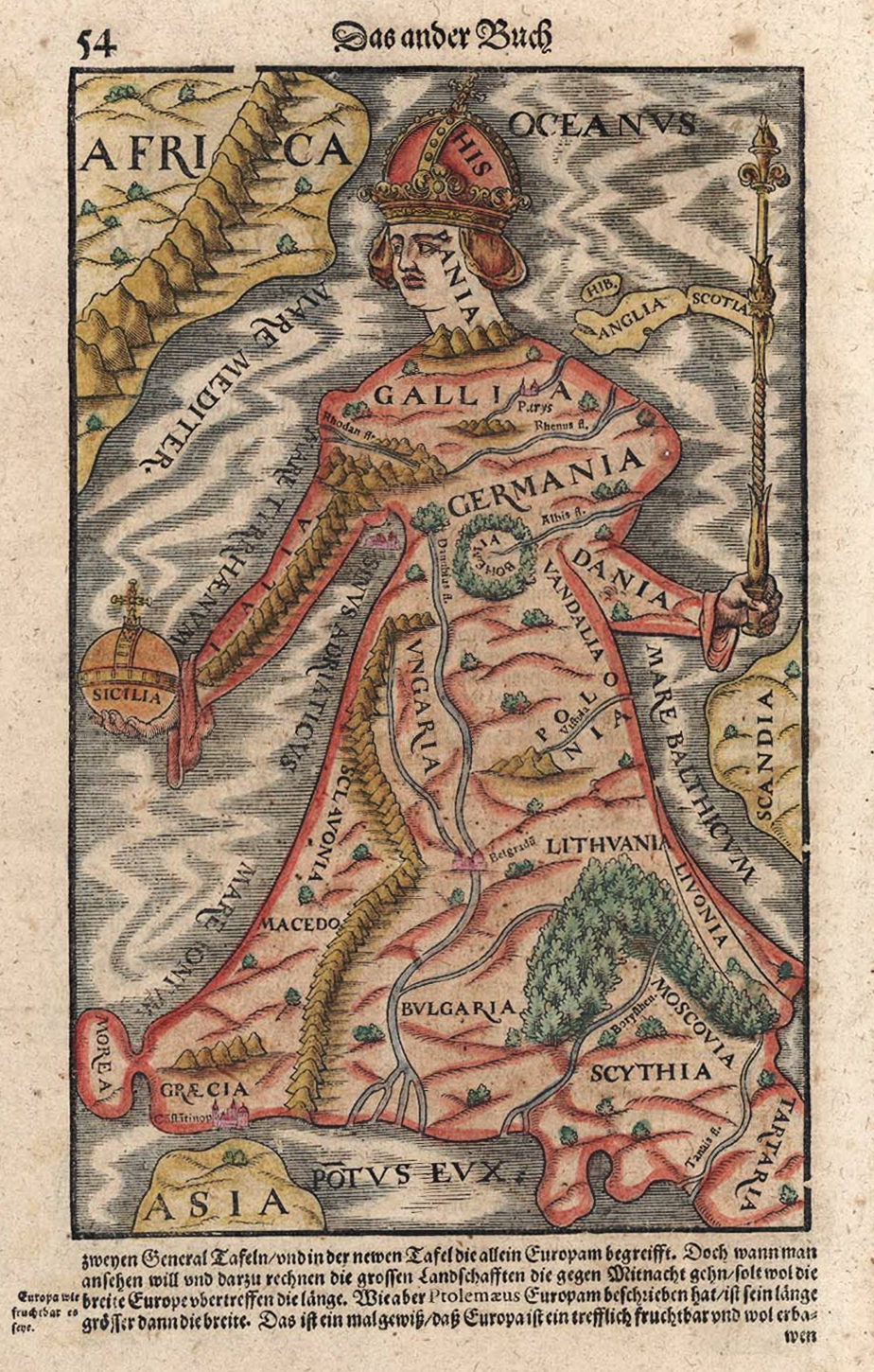
Europa regina in Münster's "Cosmographia", 1570.

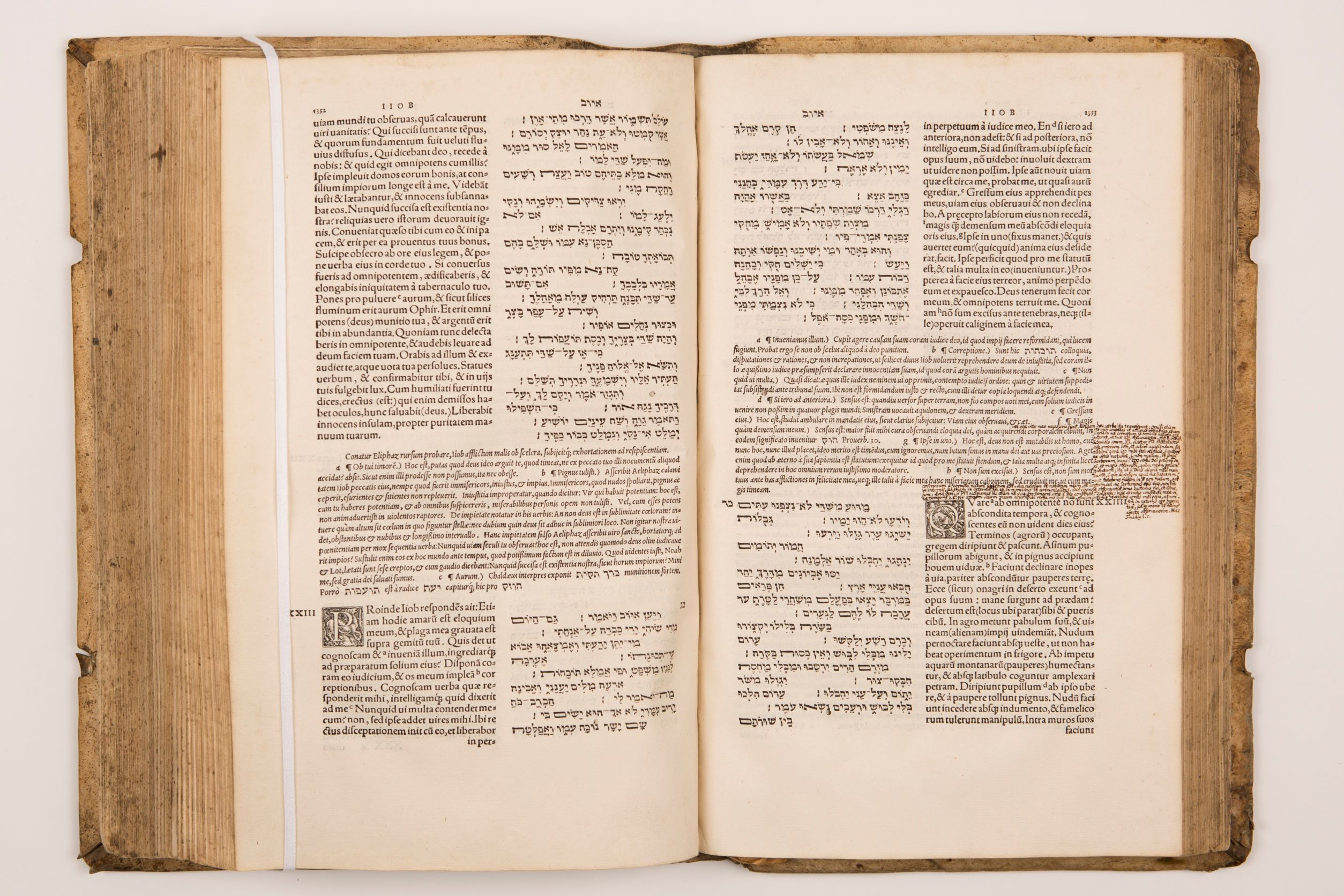
Sebastian Münster, Biblia Hebraica: Latin translation of the Hebrew Bible printed by Heinrich Petri and Michael Isengrin, 1546, Basel, in the collection of the Jewish Museum of Switzerland.

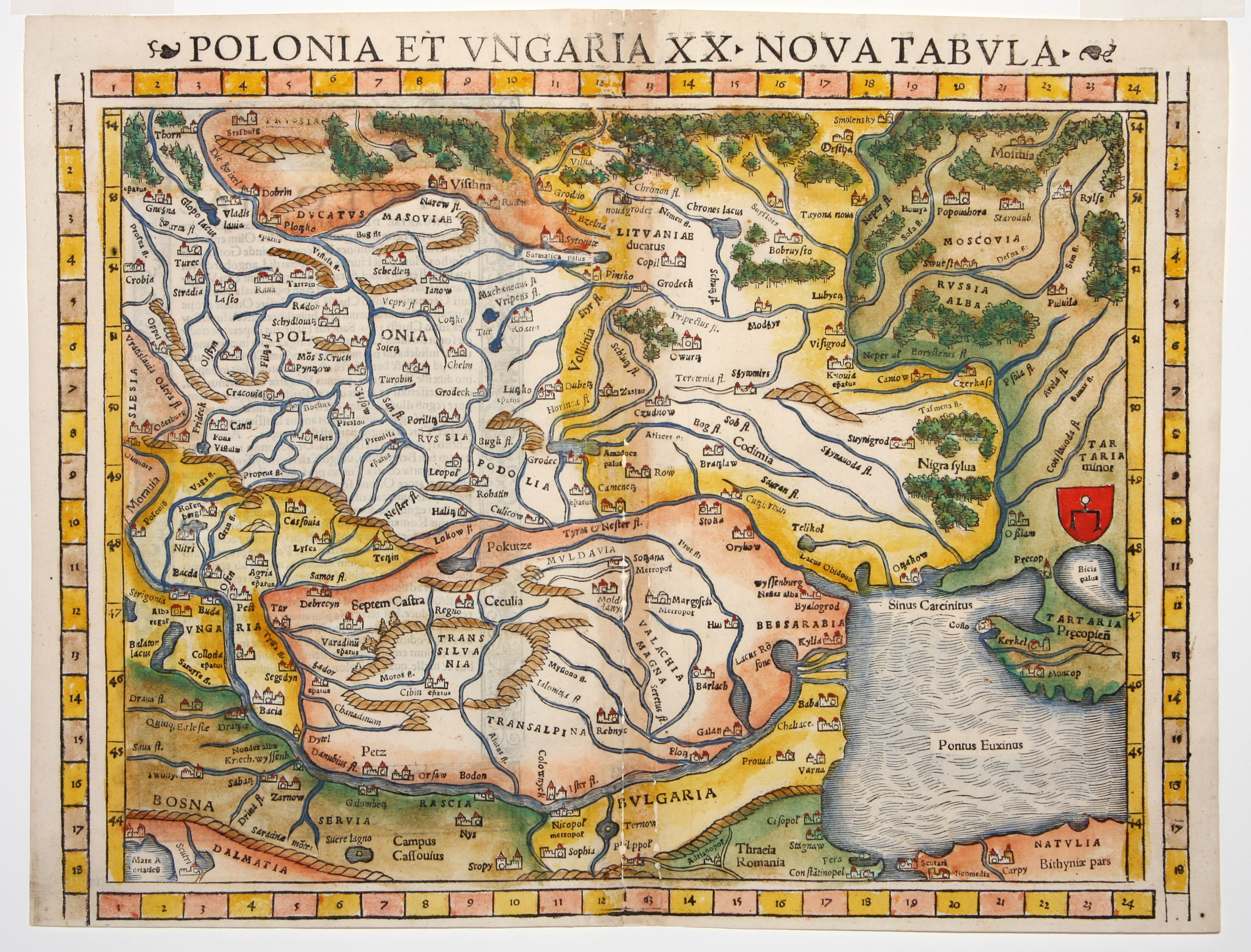
A 1552 map showing the Pinsk Marshes (Sarmatica palus) next to Pinsk.
