= Nikos Sideris =

Greek psychiatrist, translator, poet and writer

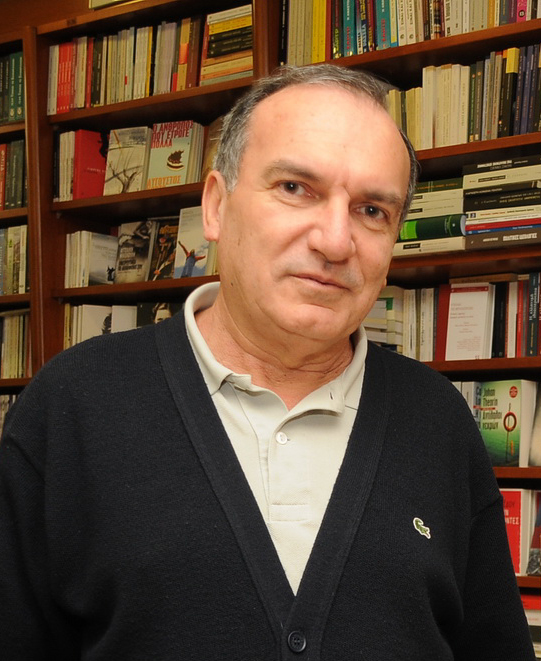
- Nikos Sideris
- Born: 20 January 1952 (age 74); Athens, Greece
- Occupations: Psychiatrist, writer
- Website: www.siderman.gr

Nikos Sideris (Greek: Νίκος Σιδέρης; born 20 January 1952), is a Greek psychiatrist, translator, poet and writer.

== Biography ==
Sideris studied medicine at the University of Athens. He then settled in Paris for his postgraduate studies (specializing in Psychiatry, History and Neuropsychology-Neurolinguistics). He is a PhD of Panteion University Psychology Department and teaching psychoanalyst, member of the Strasbourg School of Psychoanalysis (E.P.S.) and the European Federation of Psychoanalysis and Psychoanalytic School of Strasburg (FEDEPSY). He works as a psychiatrist, psychoanalyst and family therapist in Athens.

His book "Children do not need psychologists. They need parents!" (Τα παιδιά δεν θέλουν ψυχολόγο. Γονείς θέλουν) became a non-fiction best-seller in Greece.

== Works ==
=== Poetry ===
- Gko, 1983 (Kastaniotis Publications)
- Circumnavigation or Overturn of Names, 1990 (Kastaniotis Publications)
- Tender Oarsman, 2000 (Kastaniotis Publications)
- The Art of the Grain, 2011 (Metaichmio Publications)

=== Fiction ===
- Love Song, 1998 (Kastaniotis Publications)
- The Ballad of Dust, 2003 (Kastaniotis Publications)
- A Song for Orpheus, 2011 (Metaichmio Publications)

=== Non-fiction ===
- Inner Bilingualism, 1995 (Kastaniotis Publications)
- And yet they are talking – Adolescent discourse , 1999 (Kastaniotis Publications)
- Architecture and Psychoanalysis – Fantasy and Construction, 2006 (futura)
- Children do not need psychologists. They need parents!, 2009 (Metaichmio Publications)
- As they have been told and heard –Secrets and truths from the psychoanalyst’s couch, 2008 (Metaichmio Publications)
- Freud crypto-red? - History, theory, fantasy, 2009 (Opportuna Publications)
- You are not the only one playing. There are also others!, 2010 (Metaichmio Publications)
- Eroticism in Art – Pictorial Fantasies, 2010 (Metaichmio Publications)
- Talking with the child about the crisis, 2013 (Metaichmio Publications)
- The Devil's Gospel — Political Psychology of the Crisis, 2014 (Metaichmio Publications)
- Bullying: it can be beaten! A strategy for parents, teachers, children and everybody else, 2016 (Metaichmio Publications) [co-authored with: Dimitra Giannakopoulou and Pavlos Haramis]
- Loss - Mourning - Depression: Passion and Redemption, 2020 (Metaichmio Publications) [co-authored with: Aimilianos Sideris]

=== Translations into Greek ===
- Carlos Castaneda, Tales of Power, 1978 (Kastaniotis Publications)
- Wilhelm Reich, Character Analysis: Technique, 1981 (Kastaniotis Publications)
- Wilhelm Reich, Character Analysis: Theory of character formation, 1981 (Kastaniotis Publications)
- Wilhelm Reich, People in Trouble, 1988 (Kastaniotis Publications)
- Wilhelm Reich, Character Analysis: From psychoanalysis to orgone biophysics, 1990 (Kastaniotis Publications)
- Jean Claude Bringuier, Conversations with Jean Piaget, 1999 (Kastaniotis Publications)

=== Works written in English ===
- John Shannon Hendrix and Lorens Holm (ed.), Architecture and the Unconscious, Ashgate, Oxford 2016. Chapter entitled: Architecture and the Unconscious: Fantasy, Construction, and the Dual Spatiality. ISBN 978-1472456472

=== Works translated into English ===
- Architecture and Psychoanalysis: Fantasy and Construction, 2013, Kindle Edition, ASIN: B00FWPBWZ0

=== Works translated into Albanian ===
- Fëmijët nuk duan psikolog, Duan prindër! (Children do not need psychologists. They need parents!)
