= C18H20N2O6 =

The molecular formula C_{18}H_{20}N_{2}O_{6} (molar mass: 360.36 g/mol, exact mass: 360.1321 u) may refer to:

- CI-1017
- EDDHA
- Nitrendipine
- Sterculinine
- Dityrosine
