= Polsterberg Pumphouse =

Coordinates: 51°47′43″N 10°24′08″E

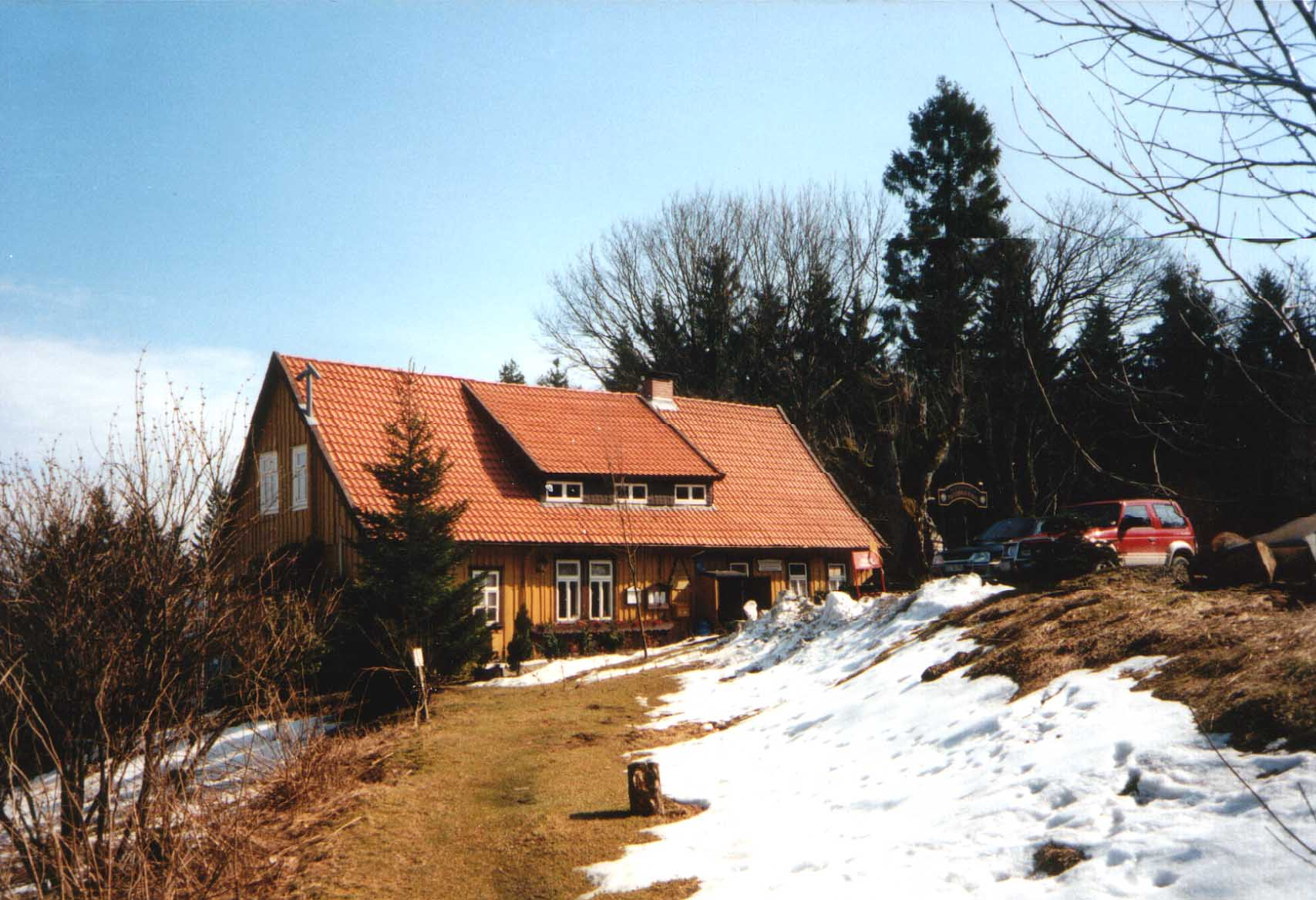
The Polsterberg Pumphouse on the Dyke Ditch

The Polsterberg Pumphouse (German: Polsterberger Hubhaus) is a pumping station above the Dyke Ditch in the Upper Harz in central Germany which is used today as a forest restaurant.

As part of the Upper Harz Water Regale it was built in the 18th century and was used to lift the water needed in Clausthal for the mining industry from the Dyke Ditch (Dammgraben) to the level of the highest pond, the Hirschler Pond. Aside from this water hoist, the Dyke Ditch supplied, and still supplies, water over ditches and tunnels to the Hausherzberg Ponds and the Lower Peacock Pond (Unterer Pfauenteich). The problem was however, that, as it happened, the most productive silver mines in the Upper Harz mining region, the Caroline Pit and the Dorothea Pit, were high up in the mountains and could only be supplied with water power from the Hirschler Pond.

The motive force for the wooden piston pumps was won in the Polster valley below by two water wheels. The headrace for these water wheels was brought via the Heller Valley Ditch (Hellertal Graben) from the Heller valley and from the Fortune Pond over its Bottom Ditch (Grundgraben), but frictional losses and poor efficiencies meant that a considerable amount of headrace water was required in order to lift just a few litres of water from the Dyke Ditch. These wheels transferred their output power over 260 and 560 m long flat rods made of wood to the pumping station on the Polsterberg hill. In the pumping station the water from the Dyke Ditch was pumped 8 m higher and fed into drinking troughs from which it was then further transported via the Hutthal Ditch and Huttaler Widerwaage to the Hirschler Pond, or via the Jägersbleek Tunnel and Ditch. The Polsterberg Pumphouse also acted as living accommodation for the master pumper and the ditch keepers, as well as a bar (Schankstube).

At the beginning of the 20th century the wooden structures were replaced by electrically-drive pumps; the original can still be seen in the pumphouse by the ditch. Today the building is listed. It is purely run as a restaurant and is a popular destination for walkers from Altenau and Clausthal-Zellerfeld. Like the nearby Sperberhai Dam House it lies on the Harz High Road, the B 242.

== See also ==
- Polster Valley Wheel House
- Upper Harz Water Regale
