= Polster Valley Wheel House =

Coordinates: 51°47′58″N 10°24′59″E

The Polster Valley Wheel House (German: Polstertaler Zechenhaus) lies in the Polster valley about three kilometres from Altenau in the Upper Harz region of Germany and is surrounded by a campsite.

The wheel house was built in 1729 and provided power for the pumping station of the Polsterberg Pumphouse (Polsterberger Hubhaus) with two water wheels until the early 20th century.
