= Wilhelm Knop =

German agricultural chemist and botanist (1817–1891)

- Born: 28 July 1817; Altenau, Lower Saxony, Germany
- Died: 28 January 1891 (aged 73); Leipzig, Germany
- Education: University of Göttingen
- Known for: Knop's solution Hoagland and Knop medium
- Scientific career
- Fields: Plant Physiology; Fertilizer Science
- Workplaces: University of Göttingen; University of Heidelberg; University of Leipzig

Johann August Ludwig Wilhelm Knop (28 July 1817 – 28 January 1891) was a German agrochemist and, together with Julius von Sachs, co-founder of modern water culture due to his pioneering experiments with the cultivation of crops in nutrient solutions.

== Life and career ==
Wilhelm Knop was born in Altenau as the son of the forester Ludewig Ernst Knop and his wife Philippine Amalie Haeberle. The mineralogist and scholar Adolf Knop was one of his brothers. He studied natural sciences at the Universities of Göttingen and Heidelberg and taught mechanics and natural sciences at the commercial college in Leipzig from 1847 to 1856. In 1853, he habilitated with a thesis on the physiology of aquatic plants at the University of Leipzig, where he worked as a professor from 1861 and as a full honorary professor of agricultural chemistry from 1880. From 1856 to 1866, he was also head of the scientific department of the Möckern Agricultural Experiment Station near Leipzig. In 1864, he was accepted as a full member of the Saxon Academy of Sciences and Humanities.

== Work ==
Knop's research activities focused on the fields of plant physiology and fertilizer science. Alongside Julius von Sachs, he identified nitrogen, phosphorus, sulfur, potassium, calcium, magnesium, and iron as essential elements for plant nutrition. Knop and von Sachs pioneered the use of standard nutrient solutions in experimental plant physiology.

Knop's solution, which consists of his four-salt mixture and traces of an iron salt, is still commonly used in plant biology today. Dennis Robert Hoagland and Daniel Israel Arnon proposed that Sachs' solution (1860), Knop's solution (1865), Pfeffer's solution (1900), and Crone's solution (1902) should be supplemented with boron, manganese, zinc, copper and molybdenum for best results with water culture experiments.

For Knop, the cultivation of crops in nutrient solutions was primarily a method for discovering scientific laws, a principle shared by Dennis Hoagland. For determining the effectiveness of mineral fertilizers, he regarded the field experiment as the authoritative method of investigation. The names of Hoagland and Knop are commonly used as a brand for an innovative product, namely the Hoagland and Knop medium, which has been specially formulated for plant cell, tissue and organ cultures on agar.

Knop published the Chemisch-Pharmaceutisches Centralblatt from 1848 to 1862 and for a time the Chemisches Centralblatt. He wrote several specialist books on agricultural chemistry and fertilisation problems in agriculture. Most of his experimental results appeared in the journal Die landwirthschaftlichen Versuchs-Stationen.

== Publications ==
- 1853: Über das Verhalten einiger Wasserpflanzen zu Gasen
- 1859: Handbuch der chemischen Methoden
- 1860: Über die Ernährung der Pflanzen durch wässerige Lösungen bei Ausschluss des Bodens
- 1868: Der Kreislauf des Stoffs. Lehrbuch der Agricultur-Chemie
- 1871: Die Bonitirung der Ackererde
- 1883: Ackererde und Culturpflanze
