= Hoagland solution =

Hydroponic nutrient solution

The Hoagland solution (HS) is a hydroponic nutrient solution that was newly developed by Hoagland and Snyder in 1933, modified by Hoagland and Arnon in 1938, and revised by Arnon in 1950. It is one of the most popular standard solution compositions for growing plants, in the scientific world at least, with more than 21,000 citations listed by Google Scholar. The Hoagland solution provides all essential elements for plant nutrition and is appropriate for supporting normal growth of a large variety of plant species.

== Modifications ==
The artificial solution described by Dennis Hoagland in 1933, known as Hoagland solution (0), has been modified several times, mainly to add ferric chelates to keep iron effectively in solution, and to optimize the composition and concentration of trace elements other than iron, some of which are not generally credited with a function in plant nutrition. In Hoagland's nutrient recipes of 1938, referred to as Hoagland solution (1, 2), the number of trace elements was subsequently reduced to the generally accepted essential elements (B, Mn, Zn, Cu, Mo, Fe, and Cl). Later research confirmed that their concentrations had been adjusted for optimal plant growth.

In Arnon's revision of 1950, only one concentration (Mo 0.011 ppm) was changed compared to 1938 (Mo 0.048 ppm), while the concentration of macronutrients of the Hoagland solutions (0), (1), and (2) remained the same since 1933, with the exception of calcium (Ca 160 ppm) in solution (2). The main difference between solution (1) and solution (2) is the different use of nitrate-nitrogen and ammonium-nitrogen based stock solutions to prepare the respective Hoagland solution of interest. Accordingly, the original 1933 and the modified concentrations of 1938 and 1950 for each essential element and sodium are shown below, the calculation of the latter values being derived from Tables 1 and 2:

- N 210 ppm
- P 31 ppm
- S 64 ppm
- Cl 0.14 ppm / 0.65 ppm
- B 0.11 ppm / 0.5 ppm
- Na 0 ppm / 0.023 ppm / 1.2 ppm*
- Mg 48.6 ppm
- K 235 ppm
- Ca 200 ppm / 160 ppm
- Mn 0.11 ppm / 0.5 ppm
- Zn 0.023 ppm / 0.05 ppm
- Cu 0.014 ppm / 0.02 ppm
- Mo 0.018 ppm / 0.048 ppm / 0.011 ppm
- Fe 1 ppm / 2.9 ppm* / 5 ppm**

== Applications ==
Plant nutrients are usually absorbed from the soil solution. The Hoagland solution, originally intended to imitate a (nutrient-) rich soil solution, has high concentrations of N and K so it is very well suited for the development of large plants like tomato and bell pepper. For example, a half-strength macronutrient solution (1) of Hoagland can be combined with a full micronutrient solution of Long Ashton or Hewitt and a tenth-strength ferric EDTA solution of Jacobson to fertilize tomato seedlings. Due to relatively high concentrations in the aqueous stock solutions (cf. Tables 1 and 2) the Hoagland solution is very good for the growth of plants with lower nutrient demands as well, such as lettuce and aquatic plants, with the further dilution of the preparation to 1/4 or 1/5 of the original or a modified HS.

== Components ==
Salts, acids and complex ions to make up the Hoagland hydroponic solution formulations (1) and (2):

1. Potassium nitrate, KNO_{3}
2. Calcium nitrate tetrahydrate, Ca(NO_{3})_{2}•4H_{2}O
3. Magnesium sulfate heptahydrate, MgSO_{4}•7H_{2}O
4. Potassium dihydrogen phosphate, KH_{2}PO_{4} or
5. Ammonium dihydrogen phosphate, (NH_{4})H_{2}PO_{4}
6. Boric acid, H_{3}BO_{3}
7. Manganese chloride tetrahydrate, MnCl_{2}•4H_{2}O
8. Zinc sulfate heptahydrate, ZnSO_{4}•7H_{2}O
9. Copper sulfate pentahydrate, CuSO_{4}•5H_{2}O
10. Molybdic acid monohydrate, H_{2}MoO_{4}•H_{2}O or
11. Sodium molybdate dihydrate, Na_{2}MoO_{4}•2H_{2}O
12. Ferric tartrate or Iron chelate (Fe-EDDHA^{−})* or Iron(III)-EDTA^{−}**

=== Components for Hoagland solution (1) ===
To prepare the stock solutions and a full Hoagland solution (1)

Table 1
| Component | Quantities in solution | |
| Component | g/L | mL/L |
Macronutrients
| 2M KNO_{3} | 202 | 2.5 |
| 2M Ca(NO_{3})_{2}•4H_{2}O | 472 | 2.5 |
| 2M MgSO_{4}•7H_{2}O | 493 | 1 |
| 1M KH_{2}PO_{4} | 136 | 1 |
Micronutrients
| H_{3}BO_{3} | 2.86 | 1 |
| MnCl_{2}•4H_{2}O | 1.81 | 1 |
| ZnSO_{4}•7H_{2}O | 0.22 | 1 |
| CuSO_{4}•5H_{2}O | 0.08 | 1 |
| H_{2}MoO_{4}•H_{2}O, or | 0.09 | 1 |
| Na_{2}MoO_{4}•2H_{2}O | 0.12 | 1 |
Iron
| C_{12}H_{12}Fe_{2}O_{18}, or Sprint 138 iron chelate* | 5; 15 | 1; 1.5 |

=== Components for Hoagland solution (2) ===
To prepare the stock solutions and a full Hoagland solution (2)

Table 2
| Component | Quantities in solution | |
| Component | g/L | mL/L |
Macronutrients
| 2M KNO_{3} | 202 | 3 |
| 2M Ca(NO_{3})_{2}•4H_{2}O | 472 | 2 |
| 2M MgSO_{4}•7H_{2}O | 493 | 1 |
| 1M NH_{4}H_{2}PO_{4} | 115 | 1 |
Micronutrients
| H_{3}BO_{3} | 2.86 | 1 |
| MnCl_{2}•4H_{2}O | 1.81 | 1 |
| ZnSO_{4}•7H_{2}O | 0.22 | 1 |
| CuSO_{4}•5H_{2}O | 0.08 | 1 |
| H_{2}MoO_{4}•H_{2}O | 0.02 | 1 |
Iron
| C_{12}H_{12}Fe_{2}O_{18}, or Sprint 138 iron chelate* | 5; 15 | 1; 1.5 |

=== Alternatives for some components ===
==== Micronutrients ====
Sprint 138 iron chelate is produced as Na-Fe-EDDHA (C_{18}H_{16}FeN_{2}NaO_{6}), while Hoagland's original solution formulations contain ferric tartrate (C_{12}H_{12}Fe_{2}O_{18}), but no sodium ions. Synthesizing a sodium-free ferric EDTA complex (C_{10}H_{12}FeN_{2}O_{8}^{−}) in a laboratory is sometimes preferred to buying ready-made products. Variable micronutrients (e.g., Co, Ni) and rather non-essential elements (e.g., Pb, Hg) mentioned in Hoagland's 1933 publication (known as "A-Z solutions a and b") are no longer included in his later circulars. Most of these metallic elements, as well as organic compounds, are not necessary for normal plant nutrition. As an exception, there is evidence that, for example, some algae require cobalt for the synthesis of vitamin B12.

== See also ==
- Hoagland and Knop medium
- Knop's solution
- Long Ashton Nutrient Solution
- Murashige and Skoog medium
