= Iron-chelate-transporting ATPase =

Class of transport proteins

iron-chelate-transporting ATPase

Identifiers
- EC no.: 3.6.3.34

Databases
- IntEnz: IntEnz view
- BRENDA: BRENDA entry
- ExPASy: NiceZyme view
- KEGG: KEGG entry
- MetaCyc: metabolic pathway
- PRIAM: profile
- PDB structures: RCSB PDB PDBe PDBsum
- Gene Ontology: AmiGO / QuickGO
Search
- PMC: articles
- PubMed: articles
- NCBI: proteins

In enzymology, an iron-chelate-transporting ATPase (EC 3.6.3.34) is an enzyme that catalyzes the chemical reaction

ATP + H_{2}O + iron chelateout $\rightleftharpoons$ ADP + phosphate + iron chelatein

The 3 substrates of this enzyme are ATP, H_{2}O, and iron chelate, whereas its 3 products are ADP, phosphate, and iron chelate.

This enzyme belongs to the family of hydrolases, specifically those acting on acid anhydrides to catalyse transmembrane movement of substances. The systematic name of this enzyme class is ATP phosphohydrolase (iron-chelate-importing). This enzyme participates in abc transporters - general.

== Structural studies ==
As of late 2007, 3 structures have been solved for this class of enzymes, with PDB accession codes 1L2P, 1L6T, and 2IHY.
