= Ferric EDTA =

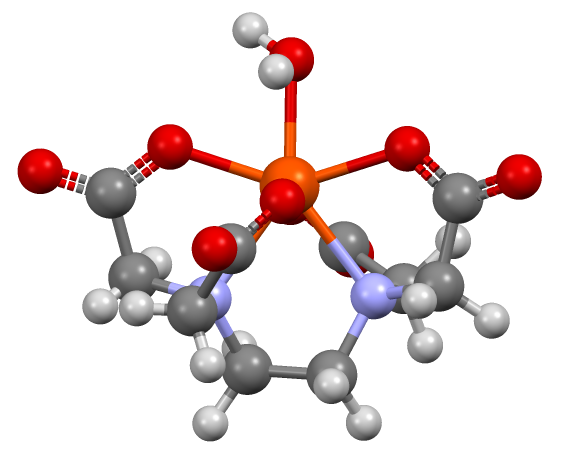

Names
- Other names (ethylenedinitrilo)tetraacetatoferrate

Identifiers
CAS Number	15275-07-7
3D model (JSmol)	Interactive image
ChemSpider	26311
EC Number	241-171-3
PubChem CID	28283
CompTox Dashboard (EPA)	DTXSID0066163
- InChI: InChI=1S/C10H16N2O8.Fe/c13-7(14)3-11(4-8(15)16)1-2-12(5-9(17)18)6-10(19)20;/h1-6H2,(H,13,14)(H,15,16)(H,17,18)(H,19,20);/q;+3/p-3 Key: UOMQUZPKALKDCA-UHFFFAOYSA-K
- SMILES: C(CN(CC(=O)[O-])CC(=O)[O-])N(CC(=O)O)CC(=O)[O-].[Fe+3]

Properties
Chemical formula	C_{10}H_{12}FeN_{2}O_{8}
Molar mass	344.057 g·mol^{−1}
Appearance	yellow

Hazards
- GHS labelling
Pictograms	(GHS07: Exclamation mark)
Signal word	Warning
Hazard statements	H315, H319
Precautionary statements	P264, P280, P302+P352, P305+P351+P338, P321, P332+P313, P337+P313, P362
- Except where otherwise noted, data are given for materials in their standard state (at 25 °C [77 °F], 100 kPa). Infobox references

Ferric EDTA is the coordination complex formed from ferric ions and EDTA. EDTA has a high affinity for ferric ions. It gives yellowish aqueous solutions.

== Synthesis and structure ==
Solutions of Fe(III)-EDTA are produced by combining ferrous salts and aqueous solutions of EDTA and aerating them:

FeSO_{4}∙7H_{2}O + K_{2}H_{2}Y + 1/4 O_{2} → K[FeY(H_{2}O)]^{.}H_{2}O + KHSO_{4} + 5.5 H_{2}O

Near neutral pH, the principal complex is [Fe(EDTA)(H_{2}O)]^{−}, although most sources ignore the aquo ligand. The tetraanion EDTA^{4−} wraps around the metal ion, binding through four carboxylates and two amines. The [Fe(EDTA)(H_{2}O)]^{−} anion has been crystallized with many cations, e.g., the trihydrate Na[Fe(EDTA)(H_{2}O)]^{.}2H_{2}O. The salts as well as the solutions are yellow-brown. Provided the standard nutrient solution in which the [Fe(EDTA)(H_{2}O)]^{−} complex will be used has a pH of at least 5.5, all the uncomplexed iron, as a result of incomplete synthesis reaction, will still change into the chelated ferric form.

== Uses ==
EDTA is used to solubilize iron(III) in water. In the absence of EDTA or similar chelating agents, ferric ions form insoluble solids and are thus not bioavailable.

Together with pentetic acid (DTPA), EDTA is widely used for sequestering metal ions. Otherwise these metal ions catalyze the decomposition of hydrogen peroxide, which is used to bleach pulp in papermaking. Several million kilograms EDTA are produced for this purpose annually.

Iron chelate is commonly used for agricultural purposes to treat chlorosis, a condition in which leaves produce insufficient chlorophyll. Iron and ligand are absorbed separately by the plant roots whereby the highly stable ferric chelate is first reduced to the less stable ferrous chelate. In horticulture, iron chelate is often referred to as 'sequestered iron' and is used as a plant tonic, often mixed with other nutrients and plant foods (e.g., seaweed). It is recommended in ornamental horticulture for feeding ericaceous plants like Rhododendrons if they are growing in calcareous soils. The sequestered iron is available to the ericaceous plants, without adjusting the soil's pH, and thus, lime-induced chlorosis is prevented.

Ferric EDTA can be used, for example, as an essential component of the Hoagland solution or the Long Ashton Nutrient Solution. According to Jacobson (1951), the stability of ferric EDTA was tested by adding 5 ppm iron, as the complex, to Hoagland's solution at various pH values. No loss of iron occurred below pH 6. In addition to Jacobson's original recipe and a modified protocol by Steiner and van Winden (1970), an updated version for producing the ferric EDTA complex is available by Nagel et al. (2020).

=== Other uses ===
Iron chelate has also been used as a bait in the chemical control of slugs, snails and slaters in agriculture in Australia and New Zealand. They have advantages over other more generally poisonous substances used as their toxicity is more specific to molluscs.

Ferric EDTA is used as a photographic bleach to convert silver metal into silver salts, that can later be removed.

== Related derivatives ==
Aside from EDTA, the chelating agents EDDHA and pentetic acid (DTPA), used to solubilize iron in water. It also can be used for the purposes of agriculture as it is bioavailable to plants.

In iron chelation therapy, deferoxamine, has been used to treat excess iron stores, i.e. haemochromatosis.

The reduced form of EDTA-Fe(III) is the EDTA-Fe(II), which appears to be essentially colorless and is very easily oxidized.

== See also ==
- DTPA
- Ferric sodium EDTA
- EDDHA
- Siderophore
- Tartrate
- Citrate
