= Upper Harz =

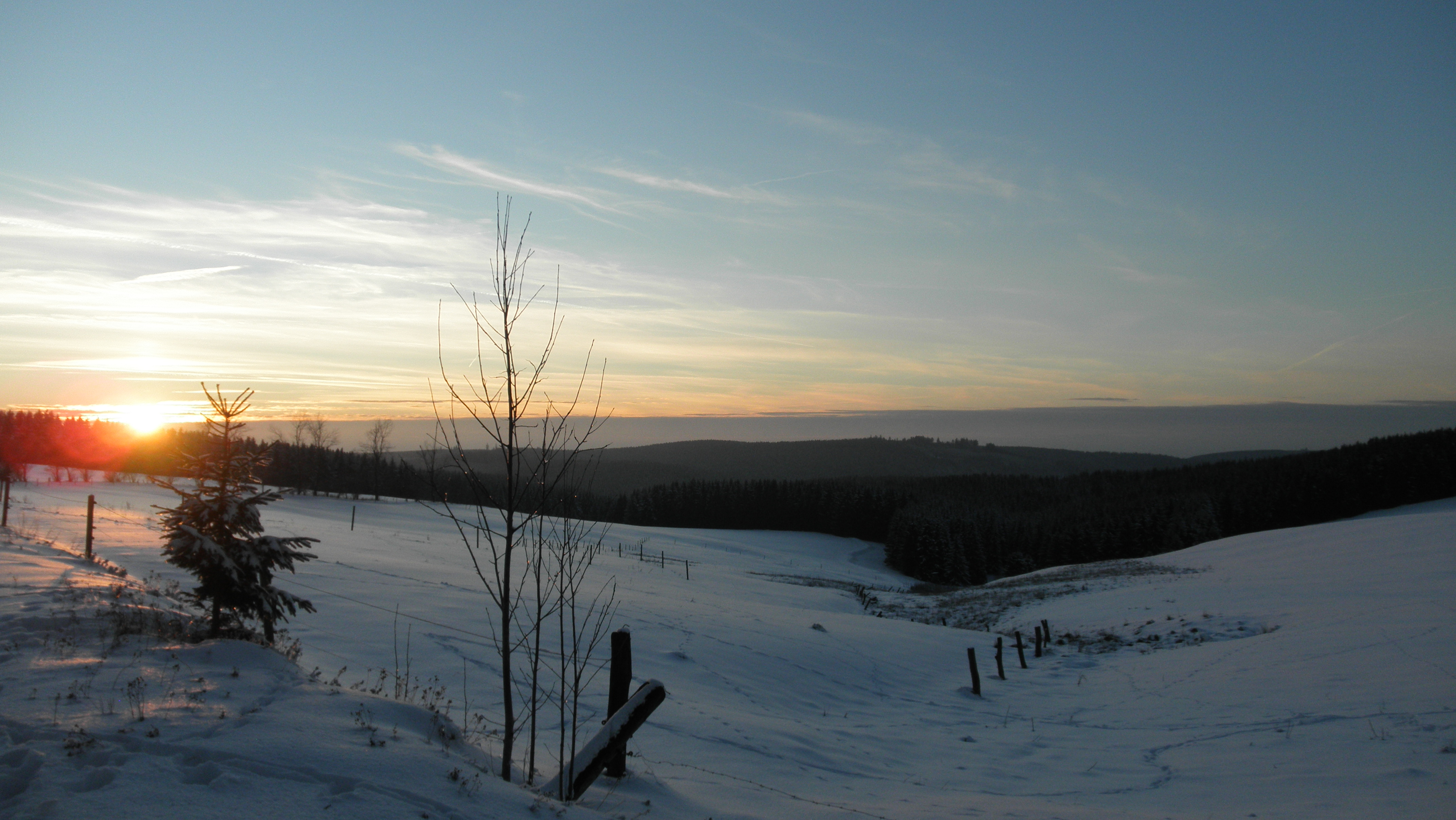
- Clausthal plateau in winter

Highest point
- Peak: Schalke
- Elevation: 762 m (2,500 ft)

Geography
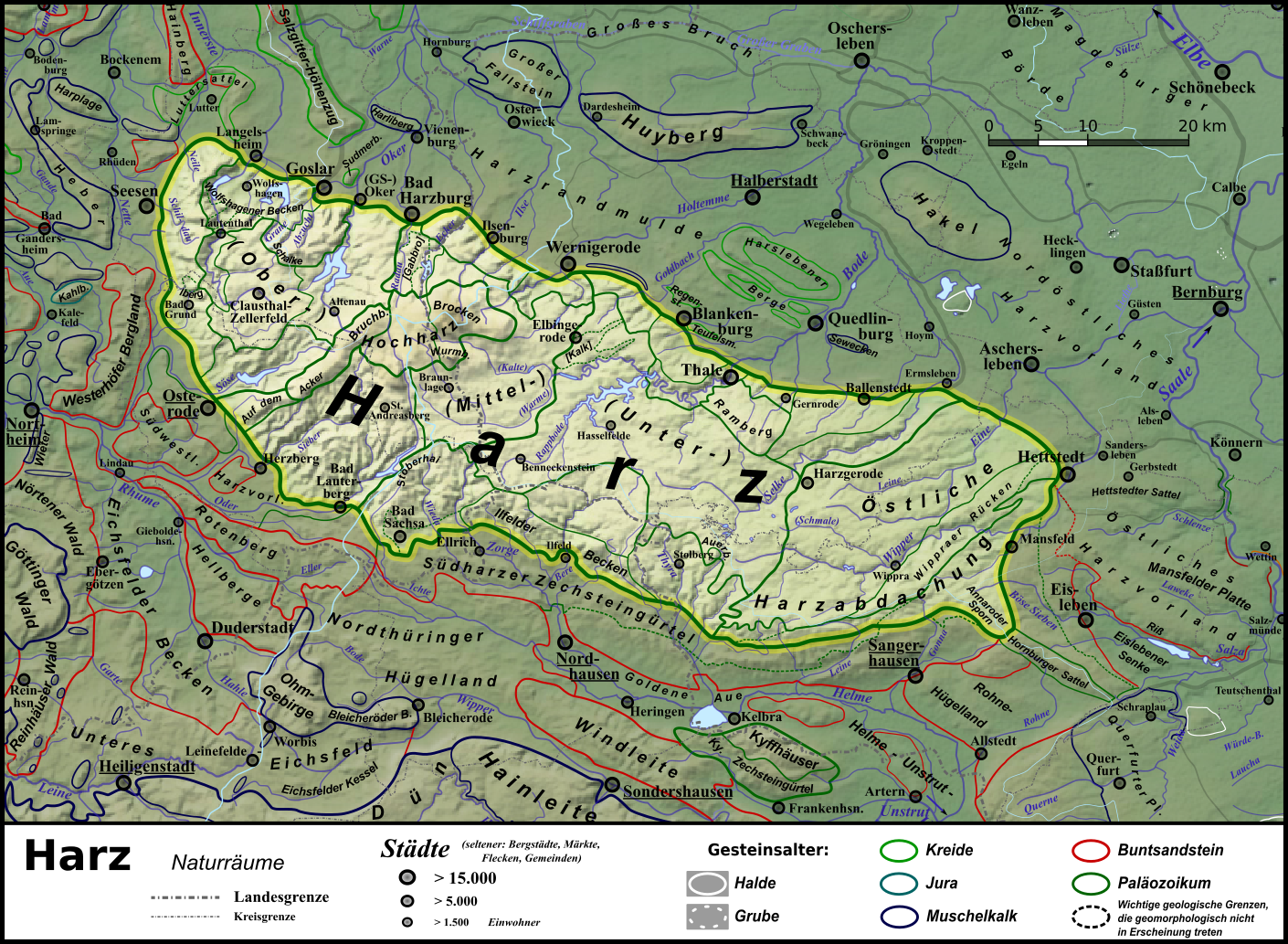
- Harz natural areas
- State(s): Lower Saxony, Germany
- Range coordinates: 51°49′N 10°22′E
- Parent range: Harz

Geology
- Rock age(s): Paleozoic (Devonian, Carboniferous)

The Upper Harz (German: Oberharz, pronounced [ˈoːbɐhaːɐ̯ts]) is the northwestern and higher part of the Harz mountain range in Germany. The exact boundaries of this geographical region may be defined differently depending on the context. In its traditional sense, the term Upper Harz covers the area of the seven historical mining towns (Bergstädte) - Clausthal, Zellerfeld, Andreasberg, Altenau, Lautenthal, Wildemann and Grund - in the present-day German federal state of Lower Saxony. Orographically, it comprises the Harz catchment areas of the Söse, Innerste and Grane, Oker and Abzucht mountain streams, all part of the larger Weser watershed.

Much of the Upper Harz area is up to 700 metres (2,300 ft) above sea level. In a wider sense, it also comprises the adjacent High Harz (Hochharz) range in the east, climbing to over 1,100 m (3,600 ft) in the Brocken massif.

== Geography ==
The region is centred on the geological structure of the region around the municipality of Clausthal-Zellerfeld, merged in 1924. From the Clausthal Kulmfaltenzone, it extends to the western and northern rim of the Harz and is bordered in the southeast by the Acker-Bruchberg ridge beyond the Söse valley.

The Upper Harz was, for centuries, dominated by the hugely profitable silver mining industry and is also distinguished by its own dialect (see below). The mining area of Sankt Andreasberg occupies a special place in this regard, because it is just east of the Bruchberg. The mines, more than anything else, have left a lasting impression on the region and left their traces in the towns and villages as well as the countryside (see e.g. Upper Harz Water Regale). Clausthal-Zellerfeld was known as "Capital of the Upper Harz" in the heyday of the mining industry. It was also the administrative seat of the former Samtgemeinde ('collective municipality') of Oberharz.

The part of the mountain range lying west of the Brocken described in a geographical sense as the Upper Harz is divided from a miner's and ironworker's perspective into the Upper Harz (Oberharz), i.e. the plateau of Clausthal, with this town and Zellerfeld and the mining towns of Altenau, Lautenthal, Wildemann, Grund and Andreasberg, and the communion of the Lower Harz, i.e. the Rammelsberg near Goslar and the ironworks that process its ore, and which lie on the northern foothills of the mountains near Ocker, Langelsheim etc. […] The actual Upper Harz, now part of the Prussian state and forming the district (Bezirk) of the Clausthal Mining Department, is that region west of the Bruchberge with mineral lodes in Devonian and Carboniferous mountains, which are divided into specific groups or seams.

— John Percy, Die Metallurgie

Another division into Upper and Lower Harz is based on the function of the Harz as a natural watershed. On this basis "by taking the Brocken as the mid-point, the Upper Harz includes everything to the west of it; the Lower Harz everything lying to the east. […] All that drains from the western mountains belongs to the catchment area of the Weser, all that drains from those in the east, to that of the Elbe". Heinrich Heine also used the Brocken as the dividing line in his book Die Harzreise ("The Harz Journey") in 1824 and remarked that the "Lower Harz, as the eastern side of the Brocken is called, as opposed to its western side, […] called the Upper Harz". This definition extends the montane Upper Harz eastwards roughly to the state border with Saxony-Anhalt, so that e.g. Braunlage or Hohegeiß may also be counted as lying within the Upper Harz, as well as some high mountain ridges:

The Upper Harz includes the plateaus of Clausthal and Andreasberg, some 2,000 feet high, and the ridges and peaks of the so-called Ackerberg, Bruchberg and Brocken which are almost twice as high […]

— Johann Georg Kohl, Deutsche Volksbilder und Naturansichten aus dem Harze.

To the east it transitions to the less prominent Lower Harz which descends gently eastwards. The High Harz (Hochharz) refers to the only sparsely populated region around the Brocken (1,141 m), Bruchberg, Wurmberg, Torfhaus and Acker, which lie above 800 m. The High Harz therefore includes most of the Harz National Park.

== Upper Harz dialect ==
One feature of the Upper Harz is, or was, the Upper Harz dialect (Oberharzer Mundart). Unlike the Lower Saxon, Eastphalian and Thuringian dialects of its surround area, this is an Erzgebirgisch dialect that goes back to the settlement in the area of mining folk from the Ore Mountains of Saxony in the 16th century.

The Upper Harz dialect is restricted to only a few places and so forms something of a language island in the Harz. The best known are Altenau, Sankt Andreasberg, Clausthal-Zellerfeld, Lautenthal and Hahnenklee. Today the dialect is rarely heard in everyday life in the Upper Harz. It is mainly members of the older generations that still speak it; as a result it is maintained in the newspapers. For example, there are occasionally articles published in the Upper Harz dialect in the local section of the Goslarsche Zeitung.

To illustrate the dialect here is the refrain of a Sankt Andreasberg folk song:

Eb de Sunne scheint, ebs stewert, schtarmt, ebs schneit,
bei Tag un Nacht ohmds oder frieh
wie hämisch klingst de doch
du ewerharzer Sproch
O Annerschbarrich wie bist de schien.

== Customs and tradition ==
- Easter Fire (Osterfeuer): In the Upper Harz the Easter fires are built with the aid of a wooden frame in the centre of which is a spruce tree. The tree is several metres higher than the wooden structure that is covered with brushwood and spruce branches. Traditionally the visitors are blackened, i.e. their faces are smeared with soot from the charred wood. In Wildemann at Easter Fire they also carry Easter torches over three metres long.
- Kurrende: During the mining era it was common for 10- to 18-year-old apprentices (Pochjungen) to parade through the streets in black coats and hats as part of a Kurrende or school choir in order to earn additional income by singing. From the age of ten - later fourteen - the apprentices worked in the crushing mills or Pochwerken where they separated ore from the rest of the rock for 12 hours a day. Not until their 18th birthday were they allowed to begin training as miners and work in the mines. The Kurrende tradition was preserved for a few years after the decline of the mines in the Upper Harz by the, mainly church-based, choirs. Today, on the important holy days, the choral society of St. Martin's parish performs the last Kurrende in the Upper Harz in Sankt Andreasberg, dressed in traditional costume.

== Upper Harz conflict ==
The town of Elbingerode and the municipalities of Brocken-Hochharz in the district of Harz decided to merge on 1 January 2010, as part of regional reforms in Saxony-Anhalt, into a new town with the name 'Oberharz am Brocken'. There were major protests against this name in the borough of Oberharz in Lower Saxony. The reasons were that, on the one hand, there was a significant risk of confusion by having two similar names, and on the other hand that the new region had never belonged to the Upper Harz, but was part of the Lower Harz.

== See also ==
- Harz
