= Hartleben =

Hartleben is a German surname. Notable people with the surname include:

- Hermine Hartleben (1846–1919), German Egyptologist
- Otto Erich Hartleben (1864–1905), German dramatist, lyricist, and author
