= Mary Belle Allen =

American biochemist

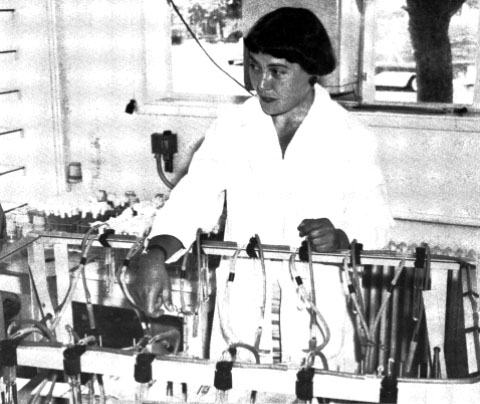
- Mary Belle Allen, Kaiser Permanente, 1959
- Born: November 11, 1922; Morristown, New Jersey
- Died: 1973 (aged 50–51); Fairbanks, Alaska
- Education: University of California, Berkeley, Columbia University
- Father: Frederick Madison Allen
- Awards: Darbaker Prize, 1962
- Scientific career
- Fields: Botany, chemistry, biochemical microbiology
- Workplaces: Hopkins Marine Station, University of California, Berkeley, Kaiser Permanente, University of Alaska Fairbanks
- Author abbrev. (botany): M.B.Allen

Mary Belle Allen (November 11, 1922, Morristown, New Jersey – 1973, Fairbanks, Alaska) was an American botanist, chemist, mycologist, algologist, and plant pathologist, and a pioneer of biochemical microbiology. With Daniel I. Arnon and F. Robert Whatley, she did breakthrough research discovering and demonstrating the role of chloroplasts in photosynthesis. In 1962 she received the Darbaker Prize from the Botanical Society of America for her work on microbial algae. In 1967 she was nominated jointly (but unsuccessfully) with Arnon and Whatley for a Nobel Prize.

The abbreviation M.B.Allen is used to indicate Mary Belle Allen as the author of the description and scientific classification of genera and species. (Consult IPNI).

== Early life and education ==
Mary Belle Allen was a daughter of Frederick Madison Allen and Belle W. Allen. She had a sister, Dorothy Llewellyn Allen (later Flynn). Allen earned her bachelor's degree with honors in 1941 from the college of chemistry at the University of California, Berkeley. She was 19.

Allen was accepted as a Ph.D. student of the University of California, Berkeley by Sam Ruben in Berkeley. Allen is listed as an assistant at the Lawrence Radiation Laboratory at the University of California, Berkeley for 1941-42 and as a chemist for the Manhattan District for 1942-44. While working with Ruben, she used radioactive tracers to study photosynthesis and chlorophyll.

Following Sam Ruben's death in 1943, Allen transferred to Columbia University. Allen received a DuPont fellowship for 1945-1946 and completed her Ph.D. in physical chemistry at Columbia University in 1946, with a thesis on Phosphorus in Starch.

=== Postdoctoral work ===
For 1946-1947, Allen received a National Research Council fellowship in chemistry at Washington University in St. Louis. She also spent a year at the Marine Biological Laboratory at the University of Chicago as a visiting fellow with James Franck and Hans Gaffron, possibly around 1951.

In 1947, she became a research associate at Mt. Sinai Hospital, New York. The first part of this appointment occurred at Hopkins Marine Station of Stanford University, California. where "Dr. Mary Belle Allen" was listed as a "visiting Investigator" from Mt. Sinai Hospital, New York. Initial funding for the project came from biochemist Harry Sobotka at Mt. Sinai Hospital, who had received a grant from the U.S. Public Health Service. She was able to continue the work through Stanford with funding from the Office of Naval Research.

At Hopkins Marine Station Allen worked with C. B. van Niel on the physiology and biochemistry of thermophiles, bacteria that can survive at high temperatures. In 1952, she reported that she had isolated an "unidentified unicellular alga" from the acid waters of "Lemonade Spring", The Geysers, Sonoma County, California. Later work suggested that it was similar to forms of Cyanidium caldarium independently discovered by Hiroyuki Hirose (1950), Felix Eugen Fritsch (1945), and Kenichiro Negoro (1935). Allen was also able to study blue-green algae, publishing a "fundamental paper" on their cultivation in 1952.

=== University of California, Berkeley ===
In the mid 1950s, Allen worked at the University of California, Berkeley with Daniel I. Arnon and F. Robert Whatley in breakthrough research on the role of chloroplasts in photosynthesis processes. Arnon et al. were the first to publish a demonstration of the synthesis of ATP in light by chloroplasts in 1954, followed by a more detailed paper by Allen et al. in 1955.

In 53 I came into a lab. where, in fact, three different people – Arnon, myself and Mary Belle Allen – had suddenly decided, from different points of view, that chloroplasts must be able to make ATP. ... So we actually set out to discover this.

— F. Robert Whatley

A visiting student describes the type of procedure that was followed:

Arnon had, you know, the white towels laid out all over the bench. Marybelle had the mortar and pestle and the acid-cleaned sand, and Andy and I were down there with the stuff ready to go. And Marybelle and Bob, the four of us, lined up when Arnon, in a pristine white coat and so forth, marched in with a tray full of spinach that had been kept in the cold room to be nice and crisp. And the procedure started. It was ceremonial, absolutely incredible. Marybelle and Bob dumped the leaves in the mortar and pestle, someone dumped the sand in, Arnon grabbed the pestle and ground the [spinach], they went to the right centrifuge with the right speed with the right head on it, spun down the cell debris, they got beautiful dark green colours -- pure chloroplasts.

— R. Clinton Fuller

Allen investigated nitrogen fixing of blue green algae and other microorganisms in both freshwater and oceans. She studied the growth of algae alongside rice as a way of enhancing the fertility of rice. As of 1956, she reported on the photosynthetic products of Chlamydomonas. In January 1957 she was listed by the Phycological Society of America as studying plankton as an assistant research biochemist and lecturer in physiology in the Department of Soils and Plant Nutrition, University of California, Berkeley.

In 1967 Allen was nominated jointly for a Nobel Prize with D.I.Arnon and Frederick Whatley. The nomination was put forward by J.H.Northrop but was not successful.

=== Kaiser Foundation Research Institute ===
In 1958, the Kaiser Foundation Research Institute (Kaiser Permanente) formally established a Laboratory of Comparative Physiology and Morphology in Richmond, California, for fundamental research in comparative biology. Ellsworth C. Dougherty was named the director, and Mary Belle Allen was named the associate director. Using spectrophotometry and other techniques, she continued to examine chlorophyll absorption and to study algal phylogenesis.

In 1960 she edited the published proceedings of the First Annual Symposium on Comparative Biology of the Kaiser Permanente Research Institute in Richmond. Allen received funding from a number of sources including the National Institute of Health in Bethesda, Maryland. In 1962 she received the Darbaker Prize from the Botanical Society of America "for outstanding contributions to phycology".

=== University of Alaska ===
In 1966 Allen was recruited as professor of microbiology at the University of Alaska Fairbanks. There she worked with the Institute of Marine Science She studied high-latitude phytoplankton and chrysophyceae. To better understand populations of aquatic microorganisms in lakes in interior Alaska, she studied bacteria in soil, which can wash into lakes. This research led to an unexpected result. She found that in many soil samples there were very few bacterial cells; some were comparable to sterilized soil.

She did more than use the algae as models and tools for unravelling the intricacies of photosynthesis; in her studies and reviews, she skillfully bridged the biochemistry with the physiology and ecology of organisms, trying to integrate in a productive way laboratory and field studies.

== Memberships ==
- American Society of Limnology and Oceanography
- Botanical Society of America

== Publications ==
- Allen, Mary Belle (1946). Phosphorus in Starch: Nature and reactions of starch phosphate. Enzymatic phosphorylation of starch and synthesis of amylopectin. New York: Columbia University.
- Allen, M. B. (1 January 1952). "The cultivation of myxophyceae". Archiv für Mikrobiologie. 17 (1): 34–53. Bibcode:1952ArMic..17...34A. doi:10.1007/BF00410816. ISSN 1432-072X. S2CID 20787061.
- Allen, MB (June 1953). "The thermophilic aerobic sporeforming bacteria". Bacteriological Reviews. 17 (2): 125–73. doi:10.1128/br.17.2.125-173.1953. PMC 180763. PMID 13058821.
- Arnon, Daniel I.; Whatley, F. R.; Allen, M. B. (1 December 1954). "Photosynthesis by Isolated Chloroplasts. II. Photosynthetic Phosphorylation, the Conversion of Light into Phosphate Bond Energy". Journal of the American Chemical Society. 76 (24): 6324–6329. Bibcode:1954JAChS..76.6324A. doi:10.1021/ja01653a025. ISSN 0002-7863.
- Allen, M. B.; Arnon, Daniel I.; Capindale, J. B.; Whatley, F. R.; Durham, Lois J. (1 August 1955). "Photosynthesis by Isolated Chloroplasts. III. Evidence for Complete Photosynthesis1". Journal of the American Chemical Society. 77 (15): 4149–4155. Bibcode:1955JAChS..77.4149A. doi:10.1021/ja01620a052. ISSN 0002-7863.
- Allen, M. B.; Whatley, F. R.; Arnon, Daniel I. (1 January 1958). "Photosynthesis by isolated chloroplasts: VI. Rates of conversion of light into chemical energy in photosynthetic phosphorylation". Biochimica et Biophysica Acta. 27 (1): 16–23. doi:10.1016/0006-3002(58)90288-9. ISSN 0006-3002. PMID 13510247.
- Allen, Mary Belle (1959). "Possible functions of chlorophyll b. Studies with green algae that lack chlorophyll b.". In Dienes, M.; Brown, R. (eds.). The Photochemical Apparatus, its Structure and Function, Report of Symposium, June 16 to 18, 1968, Brookhaven Symposium Biology. Upton, New York: Brookhaven National Laboratory. pp. 339–342.
- Allen, M. B.; Dougherty, E. C.; McLaughlin, J. J. (3 October 1959). "Chromoprotein pigments of some cryptomonad flagellates". Nature. 184: 1047–1049. doi:10.1038/1841047a0. ISSN 0028-0836. PMID 13792769. S2CID 4242764.
- Allen, Mary Belle (1 September 1959). "Studies with cyanidium caldarium, an anomalously pigmented chlorophyte". Archiv für Mikrobiologie. 32 (3): 270–277. Bibcode:1959ArMic..32..270A. doi:10.1007/BF00409348. ISSN 1432-072X. PMID 13628094. S2CID 1804474.
- Allen, M. B., ed. (1960). Comparative Biochemistry of Photoreactive Systems. New York: Academic Press.
- Allen, M.B.; Goodwin, T. W.; Phagpolngarm, Samaravadi (1960). "Carotenoid Distribution in Certain Naturally Occurring Algae and in some Artificially Induced Mutants of Chlorella pyrenoidosa". Journal of General Microbiology. 23: 98–108. doi:10.1099/00221287-23-1-93. PMID 13792770.
- Allen, Mary Belle; Fries, Lisbeth; Goodwin, T. W.; Thomas, D. M. (1964). "The Carotenoids of Algae: Pigments from some Cryptomonads, a Heterokont and some Rhodophyceae". Journal of General Microbiology. 34 (2): 259–267. doi:10.1099/00221287-34-2-259. ISSN 1465-2080. PMID 14135532.
- Allen, Mary Belle (1 October 1969). "Structure, physiology, and biochemistry of the chrysophyceae". Annual Review of Microbiology. 23 (1): 29–46. doi:10.1146/annurev.mi.23.100169.000333. ISSN 0066-4227. PMID 4899076.
- Allen, Mary Belle (1 November 1971). "High-Latitude Phytoplankton". Annual Review of Ecology and Systematics. 2 (1): 261–276. Bibcode:1971AnRES...2..261A. doi:10.1146/annurev.es.02.110171.001401. ISSN 0066-4162.
