= Frederick Campion Steward =

British botanist and plant physiologist

- Born: 16 June 1904; Pimlico, London, England
- Died: 13 September 1993 (aged 89); Tuscaloosa, Alabama
- Known for: Plant tissue culture, genetic engineering
- Spouse: Anne Temple Gordon
- Awards: Stephen Hales Prize
- Scientific career
- Fields: Botany, Physiology

Frederick Campion "Camp" Steward FRS (16 June 1904 – 13 September 1993) was a British botanist and plant physiologist.

== Early life and education ==
He was born in Pimlico, London, but brought up in Yorkshire. He was educated at Heckmondwike Grammar School and then attended the University of Leeds, where he gained a BSc in biology in 1924 and then undertook research in the botany department.

== Career ==
A Rockefeller Foundation fellowship took him first to Cornell University in 1924 and then to the University of California at Berkeley four years later, where he worked as postdoctoral researcher with Dennis Robert Hoagland from 1928 to 1929. In 1934 he returned to England as a reader in botany and from 1940 to serve in the Ministry of Aircraft Production. After the war he returned to the USA, holding appointments at the Universities of Chicago and Rochester before finally moving to Cornell in 1950.

Ever fascinated by the unfolding processes of growth and development, Steward set out to study the behaviour of mature cells, isolated from carrot roots, when cultured in sterile nutrient culture media (liquid endosperm, or coconut water), using specially designed flasks and the rotating 'Steward' wheel. He unequivocally demonstrated that plant cells are totipotent, carrying the genetic information to enable them to develop into complete plants, often by embryogenesis, if given the right chemical stimuli in the correct order – thus vindicating an earlier prophecy that this would be so.

Professor F.C. Steward discovered and laid the foundation for plant tissue culture; genetic engineering and plant biotechnology, whether of food crops or trees.

His most important scientific contribution came in 1958, when he established that plants could be totally regenerated from one cell. The finding revolutionised the world of plant cell biology, establishing for the first time that plant cuttings and shoots were no longer required to propagate hybrids and create mutations but that individual plant cells contained all the necessary information to regulate the entire plant organism. His discovery of the means to obtain such regeneration has formed the basis of the entire field of plant molecular biology, meaning that clones, hybrids and mutations of plants can be accomplished in the laboratory rather than having to resort to the far longer and cumbersome process of taking and then cultivating cuttings.

From his Cornell classrooms and laboratories, Steward was responsible for creating and inspiring a generation of botanists. Former students said that his lectures, in "advanced plant physiology" were the high point of their education. The lectures covered an entire year, he used no notes, and would speak as he walked back and forth in front of the lecture theatre in Plant Science hall. From the outset of his career, Steward was often associated with scientific controversy and he often tended to be at its epicentre. He believed that one could be and maybe should be a "majority of one" if scientific convictions dictated it.

== Recognition ==
Steward was elected a Fellow of the Royal Society in March 1957. His candidature citation read:

"[Steward] has contributed to knowledge of salt absorption, accumulation and transport since 1930. His earlier work established that ion accumulation was linked to metabolism at a time when this was doubted, and in this connection extensive studies of protein metabolism were undertaken. Steward and his colleagues Dent and Stepka made important early studies using the (then) new technique of chromatographic separation of amino acids. He has (following a distinguished war record as Director of Aircraft Equipment II) been successful in recent years in isolating from coconut milk the factors which promote or maintain plant cells in the embryonic or meristematic condition. Two have been identified definitely as diphenylures and a leuco-anthocyanin. His current studies are dealing with mode of action of these substances and with ion accumulation processes of meristem tissue".

Steward delivered The Royal Society's Croonian Lecture in 1969 on "From cultured cells to whole plants: the induction and control of their growth and morphogenesis".

In 1939/1940, together with Dennis Robert Hoagland, he published two interesting articles in one of the world's premier scientific journals, Nature, on the "Metabolism and Salt Absorption by Plants".

He wrote more than 100 scientific journal articles and several books and was an editor and contributor to the 10 volumes and 15 books of "Plant Physiology: A Treatise" (Academic Press, 1959–1991).

== Family life ==
He died in Tuscaloosa, Alabama. He had married Anne Temple Gordon, whom he met at Cornell. They had one son.
