= Wildemann =

- Stadtteil of Clausthal-Zellerfeld
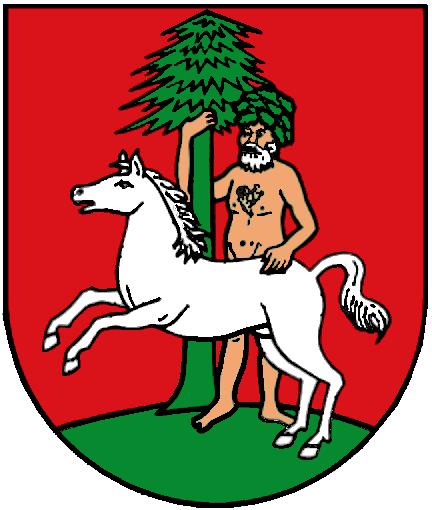
- Coat of arms
- Interactive map of Wildemann
- Location within Germany Location within Lower Saxony
- Coordinates: 51°49′41″N 10°16′57″E
- Country: Germany
- State: Lower Saxony
- District: Goslar
- Town: Clausthal-Zellerfeld

Area
  - Total: 3.34 km^{2} (1.29 sq mi)
- Elevation: 390 m (1,280 ft)

Population (2018)
  - Total: 768
  - Density: 230/km^{2} (596/sq mi)
- Time zone: UTC+01:00 (CET)
  - Summer (DST): UTC+02:00 (CEST)
- Postal codes: 38709
- Dialling codes: 05323
- Vehicle registration: GS
- Website: www.wildemann.de

Wildemann (German pronunciation: [ˈvɪldəˌman]) is a town and a former municipality in the district of Goslar, in Lower Saxony, Germany. It has been part of the town Clausthal-Zellerfeld since January 1, 2015. It is situated in the west of the Harz, northwest of Clausthal-Zellerfeld. It was part of the former Samtgemeinde ("collective municipality") Oberharz.

== History ==
Wildemann was founded in 1529 by miners from the Ore Mountains. They were sent by the Guelph Dukes to take mining in the Harz to a larger scale again. The forecast after they sighted a while penetration into the inhospitable Innerstetal Wilden Mann, who with a savage lived wife. His traces were located exactly where the largest ore deposits were. Attempts to catch him have failed. Nor did he respond to calls. Eventually he was shot at with arrows, which injured him so much that he could be captured. In captivity he neither spoke nor was he persuaded to work; he only seemed to be interested in the deposits of the ore. When it was decided to take him to the Duke, he died of gunshot wounds. Large silver deposits were found at the place where the Wilde Mann was caught, and that is where Wildemann was founded.

Silver was first extracted from raw ore in 1533 at the Wildemanns Fundgrube mine, which was built on Badstubenberg . In the years that followed, mining was intensified, the Stuffenthaler Gangzug running in the direction of Zellerfeld was built and several pits were dug there. The Spiegelthaler Zug, which runs to the east, was also opened up. In this shaft, the Harz driving art was used for the first time in 1833, which made it much easier for the miners to drive in. In 1553 Wildemann was granted mountain freedom . In 1534 Wildemann was promoted to town. In 1574 Wildemann had 995 inhabitants. Like many other villages in the area, Wildemann also suffered from the Thirty Years' War . After Tilly's troops raided the mountain town of Lautenthal, 100 of them reached Wildemann in 1626, which they then captured and plundered.

In 1875, the town was opened up to rail traffic with the Innerstetalbahn, after a 278 m-long (912 ft) tunnel had been created through the Gallenberg. At first, Wildemann did not have a corresponding reception building: after the construction of a new access road - today's Bahnhofstrasse - it was not completed until 1879 and significantly expanded in 1904. This railway line was closed in 1977.

The development of the health resort was mainly promoted by the doctor and mayor Viktor Zachariae (1837–1900). In 1873 Wildemann was recognized as a Kneipp spa . Wildemann had the status of a Kneipp and climatic health resort until the end of 2010. Mining came to a standstill in the last Ernst-August mine in 1924. Old gangways in the other mines opened up by Wildemann were abandoned as early as the 19th century. The townscape is characterized by a large number of miners' houses from the 18th and 19th centuries.

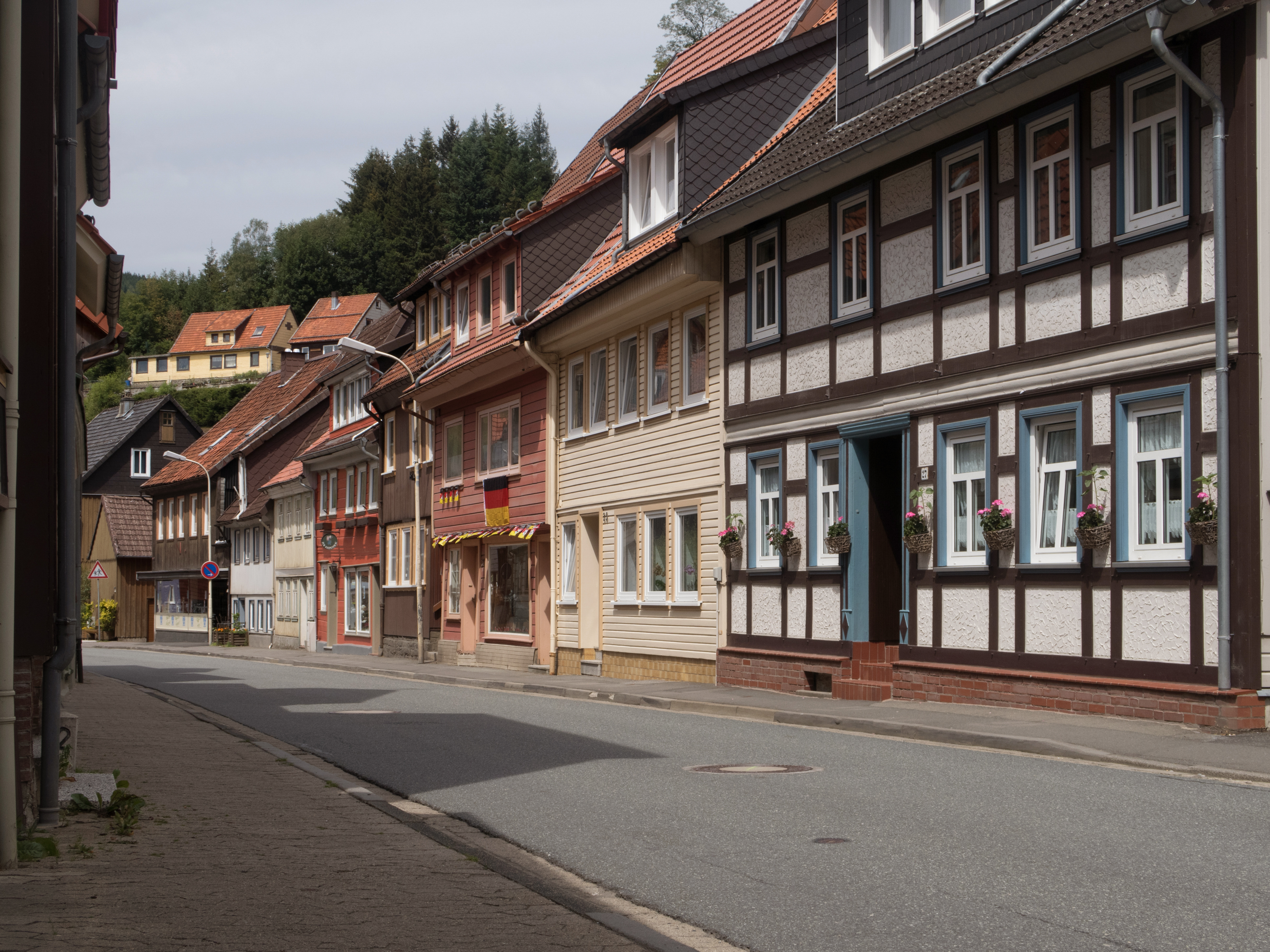
Wildemann, street view: the Bohlweg

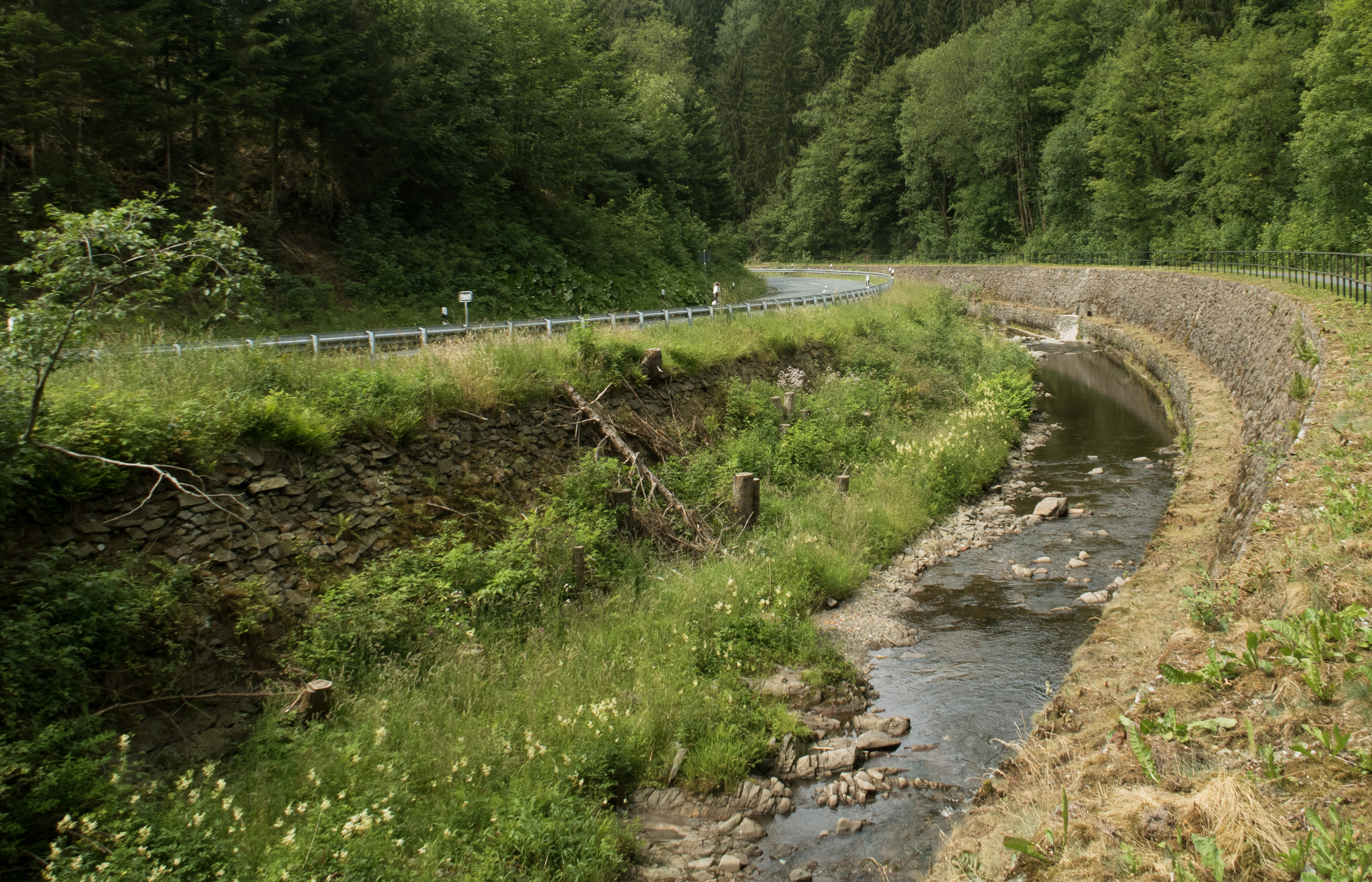
The Innerste river between Wildemann and Lautenthal

=== Incorporations ===
On January 1, 2015, the Upper Harz municipality and its affiliated municipalities, Bergstadt Clausthal-Zellerfeld, Bergstadt Altenau, Bergstadt Wildemann and Schulenberg im Oberharz, were dissolved by state law and the new mining and university town of Clausthal-Zellerfeld was formed from the previously independent municipalities.

== Traffic and Infrastructure ==
=== Traffic ===
Wildemann has a connection to the federal highway 242 via the country road 515 . Wild man with buses of public transport to reach (line 831 of the RBB ).

Until 1976, Innerstetalbahn trains stopped at Wildemann station . A year later it was discontinued and dismantled.
