= William Z. Hassid =

Scientist

- Born: October 1, 1899; Jaffa, Palestine
- Died: 1974 (aged 74–75)
- Education: University of California, Berkeley (A.B, M.S., Ph.D.)
- Occupations: pioneer research scientist in sugar biochemistry, professor
- Employer: University of California, Berkeley
- Known for: synthesis of sucrose in 1944
- Awards: Sugar Research Foundation Prize, Charles Reid Barnes Life Membership Award, C. S. Hudson Award
- Scientific career
- Fields: biochemistry

William Zev Hassid (1899–1974) was a pioneer research scientist in sugar biochemistry, who announced the synthesis of sucrose in 1944. He received the Sugar Research Foundation Prize of the National Academy of Sciences (jointly with Doudoroff and Barker) for this discovery in 1945.

He also received the Charles Reid Barnes Life Membership Award of the American Society of Plant Physiologists (1964), and the C. S. Hudson Award of the American Chemical Society (1967). In 1972, he was honored at the Sixth International Symposium on Carbohydrate Chemistry as one of three outstanding senior American carbohydrate chemists. Hassid served as a member of the National Academy of Sciences and the American Academy of Arts and Sciences, and as Chairman of the Division of Carbohydrate Chemistry of the American Chemical Society (1949–1950).

== Personal life and career ==
Hassid was born on October 1, 1899, in Jaffa, Palestine. He emigrated to the United States in 1920. Hassid received A.B, M.S. and Ph.D. degrees from University of California, Berkeley in 1925, 1930, and 1934, respectively. Hassid spent all of his academic career at the University of California, Berkeley, and became research assistant of Dennis Robert Hoagland in 1927. He was appointed professor of plant nutrition in 1947, and professor of biochemistry in 1950. He retired in 1965 and until his death in 1974 he was professor emeritus.
