= Frederick Whatley =

English botanist and biochemist (1924–2020)

Frederick Whatley FRS
- Born: 26 January 1924
- Died: 14 November 2020 (aged 96); Buckinghamshire, England
- Education: Selwyn College, Cambridge
- Known for: photosynthesis, ferredoxin, ATP, electron transport
- Awards: Nobel Prize (1967, nominated)
- Scientific career
- Fields: Biochemistry, Botany
- Workplaces: University of Oxford
- Academic advisors: Robin Hill
- Notable students: Barry Halliwell

Frederick Robert Whatley FRS (26 January 1924 – 14 November 2020) was an English botanist and biochemist who held the title of Sherardian Professor of Botany at the University of Oxford from 1971 to 1991. In 1954, Whatley, Mary Belle Allen and Daniel Israel Arnon discovered photophosphorylation in vitro. In 1967 he was nominated jointly (but unsuccessfully) with Allen and Arnon for a Nobel Prize.

== Early life and education ==
Whatley was born on 26 January 1924, and educated at Bishop Wordsworth's School, Whatley completed his BA and doctoral studies at Selwyn College, Cambridge, submitting a thesis titled "Enzyme Systems in the Green Leaf" in 1948. While no explicit mention of a supervisor was made, Dr R. Hill is thanked for his "helpful advice and criticism during the course of the work". It can be reasonably concluded that Dr R. Hill (Robin Hill) played a supervisory role in Whatley's research, with Hill and Whatley going on to publish their paper "A natural factor catalyzing reduction of methaemoglobin by isolated chloroplasts" in Proceedings of the Royal Society B: Biological Sciences, in 1952.

== Work ==
Noted for research in photosynthesis, his early career involved the methaemoglobin reducing factor, later known as ferredoxin. He then worked with leaf mitochondria in Australia, with research involving ATP synthesis. Whatley was elected a Fellow of the Royal Society in 1975.

== Personal life and death ==
Whatley died in Buckinghamshire on 14 November 2020, at the age of 96.
