= William Henry Chandler (botanist) =

William Henry Chandler (July 31, 1878 – October 29, 1970) was an American botanist and horticulturalist specializing in pomology (fruit).

He was a professor and department head at: Cornell University from 1913 to 1923; and in the University of California system from 1923 to 1948.

He moved to California in 1926, and became the dean of the Departments of Agriculture at both UC Berkeley and UC Davis. In 1938 he became assistant dean of a new branch of the UC College of Agriculture at UCLA, relocating to Los Angeles.

His academic work and philosophy emphasized the interconnectedness of botany, agriculture, and horticulture in pomology studies and practice, working closely with Dennis Robert Hoagland.
