= Adolf Knop =

German geologist and mineralogist

- Born: 12 January 1828; Altenau
- Died: 27 December 1893 (aged 65); Karlsruhe
- Education: University of Göttingen
- Known for: "Knopite" is named after him
- Scientific career
- Fields: Geology and mineralogy
- Institutions: University of Giessen
- Academic advisors: Friedrich Wöhler

Adolf Knop (12 January 1828, in Altenau – 27 December 1893, in Karlsruhe) was a German geologist and mineralogist.

He studied mathematics and sciences at the University of Göttingen, where he was a pupil of chemist Friedrich Wöhler and mineralogist Johann Friedrich Ludwig Hausmann. From 1849 he taught classes at the vocational school in Chemnitz. In 1857 he became an associate professor of geology and mineralogy at the University of Giessen, where in 1863 he attained a full professorship. In 1866 he relocated to Karlsruhe as a professor at the Polytechnic school. In 1878 he succeeded Moritz August Seubert as manager of the Grand Ducal Natural History Cabinet.

He was a catalyst towards the establishment of the Oberrheinischer Geologischer Verein (Upper Rhine Geological Society). A cerium-rich variety of perovskite called "knopite" is named after him.

== Selected works ==
- Molekularconstitution und wachsthum der krystalle, 1867 – Molecular constitution and growth of crystals.
- Studien über Stoffwandlungen im Mineralreiche besonders in Kalk- und Amphiboloid-Gesteinen, 1873 – Studies on material changes in the mineral kingdom, especially in limestone and amphiboloid rocks.
- System der Anorganographie: als Grundlage für Vorträge an Hochschulen, 1876 – System of "in organography" as a basis for lectures at universities.
