= Oberharz (Samtgemeinde) =

- Samtgemeinde
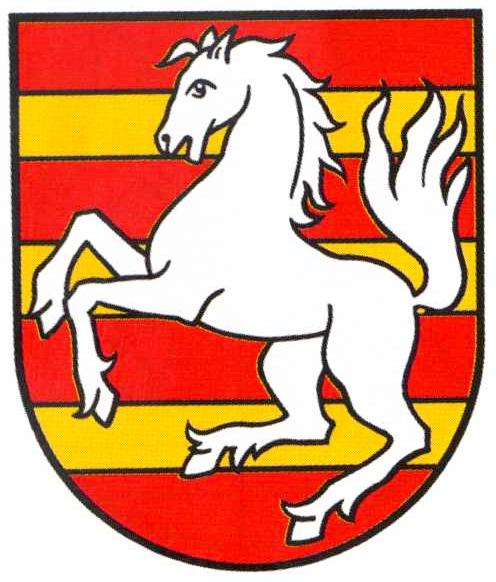
- Coat of arms
- Interactive map of Oberharz
- Location within Germany Location within Lower Saxony
- Coordinates: 51°48′11″N 10°19′58″E
- Country: Germany
- State: Lower Saxony
- District: Goslar
- Founded: 1972
- Disbanded: January 2015
- Subdivisions: 4 municipalities

Area
  - Total: 43.63 km^{2} (16.85 sq mi)
- Elevation: 560 m (1,840 ft)

Population (2013-12-31)
  - Total: 15,769
  - Density: 361.4/km^{2} (936.1/sq mi)
- Time zone: UTC+01:00 (CET)
  - Summer (DST): UTC+02:00 (CEST)
- Postal codes: 38678, 38707, 38709
- Dialling codes: 05323, 05328, 05329
- Vehicle registration: GS
- Website: www.samtgemeinde- oberharz.de

Oberharz (German pronunciation: [ˈoːbɐhaːɐ̯ts]) is a former Samtgemeinde ("collective municipality") in the district of Goslar, in Lower Saxony, Germany. It was situated in the western part of the Harz, approx. 15 km southwest of Goslar. Its seat was in the town Clausthal-Zellerfeld. It was disbanded in January 2015, when its member municipalities merged into the town Clausthal-Zellerfeld.

The Samtgemeinde Oberharz consisted of the following municipalities:

- Altenau
- Clausthal-Zellerfeld
- Schulenberg im Oberharz
- Wildemann
