= Hermine Hartleben =

German Egyptologist, biographer of Jean-François Champollion (1846–1919)

Hermine Ida Auguste Hartleben (2 June 1846 – 18 July 1919) was a German Egyptologist. She was the daughter of a forest officer in Altenau. Later, she studied in Hanover and became a teacher. She studied Greek archaeology at the Sorbonne, taught in a Greek school in Istanbul, and taught French to the children of a pasha in Egypt. At the suggestion of German Egyptologists, she wrote the first biography of Jean-François Champollion, the decipherer of Egyptian hieroglyphs.

Hartleben died in 1919 and was buried in the cemetery in Templin.

== Publications ==
- Champollion : sein Leben und sein Werk : von H. Hartleben., 1906
