= Dennis Robert Hoagland =

American plant scientist (1884–1949)

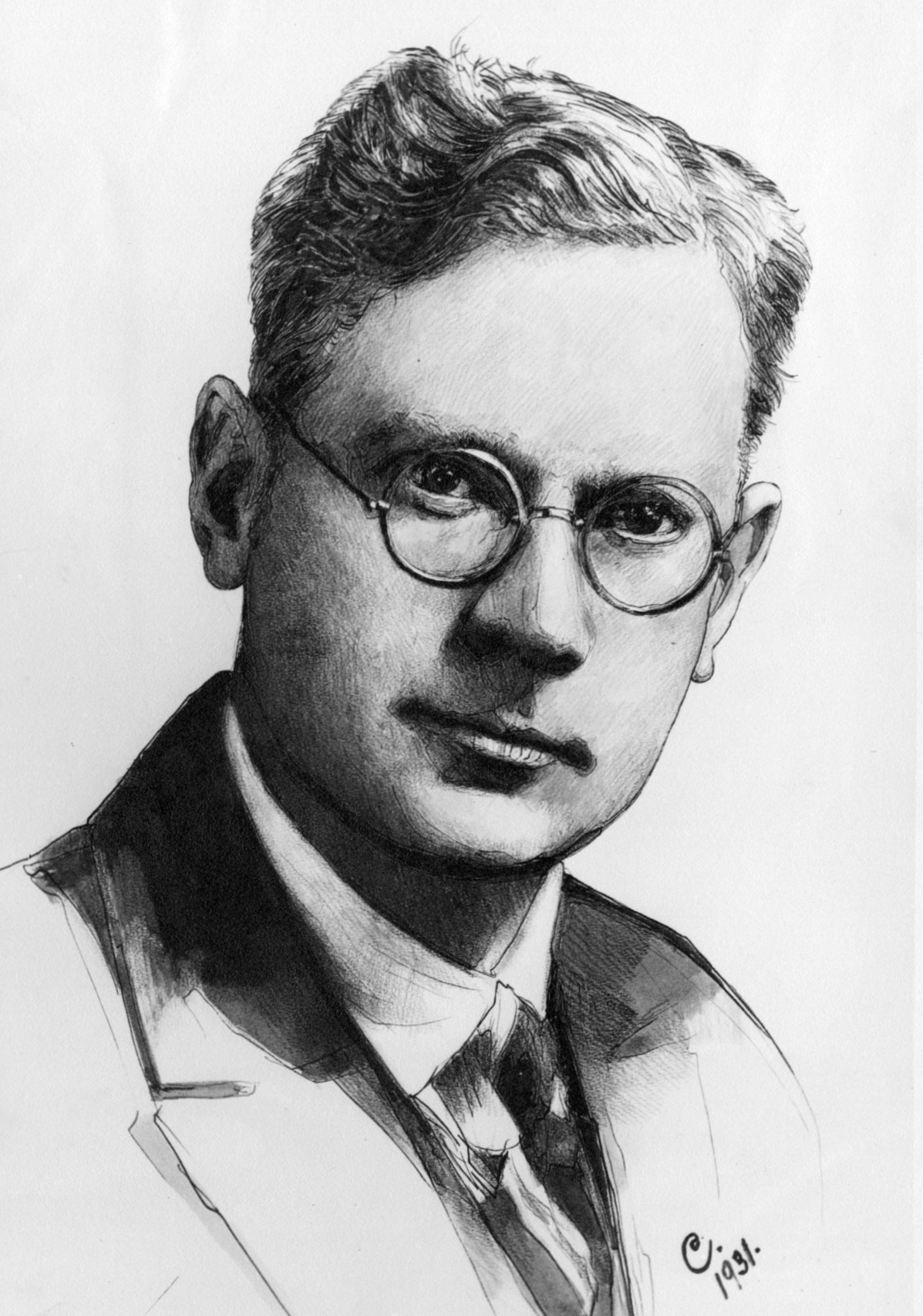
- Born: April 2, 1884; Golden, Colorado, United States
- Died: September 5, 1949 (aged 65); Oakland, California, United States
- Education: Stanford University (A.B., 1907); University of Wisconsin-Madison (Master's, 1913)
- Known for: Hoagland solution Active transport Nitella; Plant nutrition Soil pH; Soil solution Micronutrients; Water culture Hoagland and Knop medium
- Spouse: Jessie A. Smiley
- Awards: Dennis R. Hoagland Award (1985); Newcomb Cleveland Prize (1940); Stephen Hales Prize (1929)
- Scientific career
- Fields: Plant physiology Soil chemistry
- Workplaces: University of California, Berkeley
- Doctoral students: Daniel I. Arnon

Dennis Robert Hoagland (April 2, 1884 – September 5, 1949) was an American chemist and leading plant and soil scientist who pioneered work in plant nutrition, soil chemistry, agricultural chemistry, biochemistry, and physiology. He was professor of Plant Nutrition at the University of California, Berkeley, from 1927 until his death in 1949.

Dennis Hoagland is commonly known for discovering the active transport of electrolytes in plant cells using innovative model organisms such as Nitella. Under controlled experimental conditions, he succeeded in analyzing ions in a virtually uncontaminated vacuolar solution. Using hydroculture or solution culture, Hoagland was able to show that various plant diseases are due to a lack of trace elements. He demonstrated their importance for the nutrition and metabolic processes of plants by investigating the absorption of zinc and copper in fruit trees.

He gained deep insights into the complexity of interactions between plant and soil by establishing the measurement of soil pH and demonstrating the importance of soil solution, oxygen, carbon dioxide, temperature and light for plant growth and development. The application of innovative techniques such as the hydrogen electrode and freezing-point depression played a central role in measuring plant and soil reactions. His extensive empirical work on soil and fertilizer issues revealed the power of certain soil types to extract potassium from the solution.

Between 1919 and 1950, Hoagland and his associates, particularly Daniel Israel Arnon, based on their experiments with soil solutions, formulated an artificial, completely inorganic nutrient medium, universally known as Hoagland solution, that continues to be used worldwide for hydroponic plant cultivation. Although Hoagland received numerous awards and honors for his scientific expertise and outstanding human qualities, the heated public debate with his colleague William Frederick Gericke over the use of modern water culture in commercial agriculture left a bitter aftertaste.

== Biography ==
=== Private life ===
Dennis Hoagland was the son of Charles Breckenridge Hoagland (1859 – 1934) and Lillian May Hoagland (1863 – 1951). He spent his first eight years in Golden and during his later childhood he lived in Denver. He attended the Denver public schools and in 1903 entered Stanford University. In 1920, Dennis R. Hoagland married Jessie A. Smiley. She died suddenly of pneumonia in 1933. He was left with the responsibility of bringing up three young boys named Robert Charles, Albert Smiley, and Charles Rightmire.

=== Career ===
Hoagland graduated from Stanford University (1907) with a major in chemistry. In 1908 he became an instructor and assistant in the Laboratory of Animal Nutrition at the University of California at Berkeley, an institution with which he would be associated for the remainder of his life. There he worked in the fields of animal nutrition and biochemistry. In 1910 he was appointed assistant chemist in the Food and Drug Administration of the U.S. Department of Agriculture until 1912 (Schmidt and Hoagland, 1912, 1919), when he entered the graduate school in the Department of Agricultural Chemistry with Elmer McCollum at the University of Wisconsin, receiving his master's degree in 1913 (McCollum and Hoagland, 1913). In the fall of that year he became assistant professor of agricultural chemistry and in 1922 associate professor of plant nutrition at Berkeley.

=== Work ===
==== Historical overview ====
During World War I, Hoagland tried to substitute the lack of imports of potassium-based fertilizers from the German Empire to the United States with plant extracts from brown algae, inspired by the ability of giant kelp to absorb elements from seawater selectively and to accumulate potassium and iodide many times in excess of the concentrations found in seawater (Hoagland, 1915). Based on these findings he investigated the ability of plants to absorb salts against a concentration gradient and discovered the dependence of nutrient absorption and translocation on metabolic energy. Innovative model organisms and techniques, used under rigidly controlled experimental conditions, thus, enabled the identification and isolation of individual variables in the measurement of plant-specific parameters (Hoagland, Hibbard, and Davis, 1926).

During his systematic research, mainly by solution culture technique, and inspired by a principle of Julius von Sachs and the work of Wilhelm Knop, he developed the basic formula for the Hoagland solution, whose composition was originally patterned after the displaced soil solution obtained from certain soils of high productivity (Hoagland, 1919)^{1}. His research also led to new discoveries on the need and function of trace elements required by living cells, thus, establishing the essentiality of molybdenum for the growth of tomato plants, for example (Arnon and Hoagland, 1940; Hoagland, 1945). Hoagland was able to show that various plant diseases are caused by a lack of trace elements such as zinc (Hoagland, Chandler, and Hibbard, 1931, ff.), and that boron, manganese, zinc, and copper are indispensable for normal plant growth (Hoagland, 1937).

He took special interest in plant-soil interrelationships addressing, for example, the physiological balance of soil solutions and the pH dependence of plant growth, to gain a better understanding on the availability and absorption of micronutrients and macronutrients in soils and (artificial) solutions (Hoagland, 1916, 1917, 1920, 1922; Hoagland and Arnon, 1941). Hoagland and his associates, including his research assistant William Z. Hassid, thus, contributed to the understanding of fundamental cellular physiological processes in green plants that are driven by sunlight as the ultimate form of energy (Hoagland and Davis, 1929; Hoagland and Steward, 1939, 1940; Hoagland, 1944, 1946).

Hoagland was a founder of the Annual Review of Biochemistry and a proponent of the Annual Review of Plant Physiology and the Annual Review of Medicine which first appeared in 1950, after his death.

==== Hoagland's and Knop's solutions ====
Dennis Hoagland was the first to develop a new type of solution based on the composition of the soil solution (Hoagland, 1919)^{1}. He also developed the first successful concept for distinguishing between concentration and total amount of nutrients in a solution (Johnston and Hoagland, 1929). The term Hoagland solution (HS) was first mentioned by Olof Arrhenius in 1922 with reference to the Hoagland publication of 1919^{1} where he defined an optimum nutrient solution as "the minimum concentration which gave maximum yield and beyond there was no further improvement". The respective solution published by Hoagland in 1920 was applied to investigate plant growth parameters of barley in comparison with Shive's solution. The growth of Alfalfa in a modified Hoagland solution was investigated at various pH values in the 1920s. Around the 1930s Hoagland and his associates investigated diseases of certain plants, and thereby, observed symptoms related to existing soil conditions such as salinity or nutrient deficiency. In this context, Hoagland undertook water culture experiments with the hope of delivering similar symptoms under controlled laboratory conditions. For these experiments the Hoagland solution (0), including macronutrients, iron, and the supplementary solutions A and B (trace elements), was newly developed to investigate certain diseases of the strawberry in California (Hoagland and Snyder, 1933).

Hoagland's research was supported by the plant pathologists H. E. Thomas and W. C. Snyder, and influenced by another pioneer of plant nutrition and hydroculture, William Frederick Gericke, who is featured in a historical video by Arthur Clarence Pillsbury. Gericke's groundbreaking results in applying the principles of water culture to commercial agriculture inspired him to expand his research on the subject finally resulting in the Hoagland solutions (1) and (2) (Hoagland and Arnon, 1938, 1950). The composition and concentration of macronutrients of the Hoagland solutions (0) and (1) can be traced back to Wilhelm Knop's four-salt mixture and the molar ratio of the components to experimental results of Hoagland and his associates (cf. Tables (1) and (2)). Knop's solution, in contrast to Hoagland's solution, was not supplemented with trace elements (micronutrients), with the exception of iron, because the chemicals were not particularly pure in Wilhelm Knop's day. Micronutrients were, without knowing it, already present as impurities in the macronutrient salts. More highly purified chemicals and more sensitive methods for analysing trace concentrations were developed from 1930 and onwards.

===== Knop's solution =====
Table (1). Knop's four-salt mixture (1865)

Macronutrient salts	Quantities in solution
Macronutrient salts	g/L
KNO_{3}	0.25
Ca(NO_{3})_{2}	1.00
MgSO_{4}•7H_{2}O	0.25
KH_{2}PO_{4}	0.25

===== Macronutrients =====
Table (2). Composition and full concentration of macronutrients in Hoagland's solution (0, 1, 2) and in Knop's solution

Macronutrients	Hoagland's solution (0, 1)	Hoagland's solution (2)	Knop's solution
Macronutrients	Quantities in solution		
Macronutrients	μmol/L	μmol/L	μmol/L
K^{+}	6,000	6,000	4,310
Ca^{2+}	5,000*	4,000**	6,094
Mg^{2+}	2,000	2,000	1,014
NO^{−}_{3}	15,000	14,000	14,661
NH^{+}_{4}	–	1,000	–
SO^{2−}_{4}	2,000	2,000	1,014
PO^{3−}_{4}	1,000	1,000	1,837

Hoagland's students included Daniel Israel Arnon who modified the composition of macronutrients of the Hoagland solution (2) (cf. Table 2) and the concentration of micronutrients (B, Mn, Zn, Cu, Mo, and Cl) of the Hoagland solutions (1) and (2) (cf. Table (3)) as a result of joint efforts, and Folke Karl Skoog. In contrast to the Murashige and Skoog medium, neither vitamins nor other organic compounds are provided as additives for the Hoagland solution, but only essential minerals as ingredients. Murashige and Skoog concluded that the promotion of growth of tobacco callus cultured on White's modified medium is due mainly to inorganic rather than organic constituents in aqueous tobacco leaf extracts added.

===== Micronutrients =====
Table (3). Composition and full concentration of essential micronutrients in Hoagland's solution (0, 1, 2)

Micronutrients	Hoagland's solution (0)	Hoagland's solution (1, 2)
Micronutrients	Quantities in solution	
Micronutrients	μmol/L	μmol/L
B(OH)_{4}^{−}	9.88	46.25
Mn^{2+}	1.97	9.15
Zn^{2+}	0.34	0.77
Cu^{2+}	0.22	0.32
MoO^{2−}_{4}	–	0.50* or 0.11**
MoO_{2}	0.18	–
Cl^{−}	3.93	18.29

As an additional micronutrient, 9 μM ferric tartrate (C_{12}H_{12}Fe_{2}O_{18}) is added to each of the Hoagland solution formulations (0, 1, 2), corresponding to a concentration of 18 μmol/L Fe^{3+}. Solution (2) contains ammonium and nitrate salts and may sometimes be preferred to solution (0, 1) (cf. Table 2) because the ammonium ion delays the development of undesirable alkalinity (Hoagland and Arnon, 1938, 1950). However, it is toxic to most crop species and is rarely applied as a sole nitrogen source.

=== Disputed hypotheses ===
Hoagland concluded that solutions of radically different concentrations and salt proportions did not affect the yield of a crop to any important extent. More recent studies, however, revealed that differences in growth and yield persisted among the commonly used nutrient solutions with already small differences in concentration. As an example, Hoagland's solution (2) led to increased growth of fig trees in high-tunnel and open-field conditions, respectively. One important central aspect of Hoagland's hypothesis that water culture was rarely superior to soil culture ("Yields are not strikingly different under comparable conditions.") is questionable (Hoagland and Arnon, 1938, 1950). For example, water culture led to highest biomass and protein production of hydroponically grown tobacco plants compared to other growth substrates, cultivated in the same environmental conditions and supplied with equal amounts of nutrients.

In contrast to Gericke, Hoagland regarded solution culture primarily as a method for discovering scientific laws, while Gericke emphasized that hydroponics wasn't yet a precise science. The authors' differing views are illustrated by the following quotations: "Its commercial application is justifiable under very limited conditions and only under expert supervision." (Hoagland and Arnon, 1938, 1950, The Water Culture Method for Growing Plants Without Soil); "Indeed, it is obvious that since hydroponics requires a larger expense per unit of area than does agriculture, either yields must be larger, or there must be other compensations, if the method is to succeed commercially. And experience has already shown that it can succeed." (Gericke, 1940, Complete Guide to Soilless Gardening). Not surprisingly, the history of hydroponics has proved Gericke right in his claims about the commercial use of this technique as a useful complement to conventional soil-based agriculture.

=== Awards and honors ===
Hoagland became a Fellow of the American Association for the Advancement of Science (AAAS) in 1916 and member of the National Academy of Sciences in 1934. In recognition of his many discoveries, the American Society of Plant Physiologists awarded Dennis Hoagland the first Stephen Hales Prize in 1929 and elected him as president in 1932. In 1940, together with Daniel I. Arnon, he received the AAAS Newcomb Cleveland Prize for the work "Availability of Nutrients with Special Reference to Physiological Aspects". In 1944, he published his Lectures on the Inorganic Nutrition of Plants subtitled "Prather Lectures at Harvard University" which he was invited in 1942 to give at Harvard University. In 1945, he was elected member of the American Academy of Arts and Sciences.

The Dennis R. Hoagland Award, first presented by the American Society of Plant Biologists in 1985, and Hoagland Hall, which is home to the Atmospheric Science program as well as the Environmental Health and Safety office at the UC Davis, are named in his honor.

=== Perception ===
==== Standard nutrient solutions ====
Nowadays the most common solutions for plant nutrition and plant tissue cultivation are the formulations from Hoagland and Arnon (1938, 1950), and Murashige and Skoog (1962). The basic formulas of Hoagland and Arnon are being replicated by modern manufacturers to produce liquid concentrated fertilizers for plant breeders, farmers, and average consumers. Even the names of Hoagland, Knop, Murashige and Skoog are used as a brand for innovative products, e.g., Hoagland's No. 2 Basal Salt Mixture or Murashige and Skoog Basal Salt Mixture, which are commonly used as standard chemicals in plant science. The Hoagland and Knop medium was specially formulated for plant cell, tissue and organ cultures on sterile agar.

Hoagland and many other plant nutritionists used over 150 different nutrient solution recipes during their careers (cf. Table (4)). In fact, several nutrient recipes refer to a standard name although they have little to do with the original formula. For example, as described by Hewitt, several recipes have been published under the name of "Hoagland", and to this day confusion may arise from a loss of memory about the original composition.

===== Hewitt's Table 30A =====
Table (4). Composition of selected standard nutrient solutions modified according to Hewitt (Table 30A). Full concentration of the (essential) elements as ppm.

Reference	Ca	Mg	Na	K	B	Mn	Cu	Zn	Mo	Fe	Cl	N	P	S	Comment
Sachs (1860)	266	48	95	386	–	–	–	–	–	–	145	139	78	177	First published standard formula
Knop (1865)	244	24	–	168	–	–	–	–	–	–	–	206	57	32	Knop's solution
Shive (1915)	208	484	–	562	–	–	–	–	–	–	–	148	448	640	Shive's solution
Hoagland (1919)^{1}	200	99	12	284	–	–	–	–	–	–	18	158	44	123	HS based on the soil solution
Hoagland (1920)	172	52	–	190	–	–	–	–	–	–	–	158	38	67	Hoagland's optimum nutrient solution
Hoagland & Snyder (1933)	200	48.6	–	235	0.11	0.11	0.014	0.023	0.018	1.0	0.14	210	31	64	Hoagland's solution (0)
Hoagland & Arnon (1938)*	200	48.6	–	235	0.50	0.50	0.02	0.05	0.048	1.0	0.65	210	31	64	Hoagland's solution (1)
Hoagland & Arnon (1950)**	160	48.6	–	235	0.50	0.50	0.02	0.05	0.011	1.0	0.65	210	31	64	Hoagland's solution (2)
Jacobson (1951)	–	–	–	10.5	–	–	–	–	–	5.0	–	–	–	2.9	Jacobson's solution
Hewitt (1952, 1966)	160	36	31	156	0.54	0.55	0.064	0.065	0.048	2.8	–	168	41	48	Long Ashton nutrient solution

==== Hybrid nutrient solutions ====
Hybrid nutrient solutions consisting, for example, of macronutrients of a modified Hoagland solution (1), micronutrients of a modified Long Ashton nutrient solution, and iron of a modified Jacobson solution, combine the physiological properties of different standard solutions to create a balanced nutrient solution that enables optimum plant growth diluted to 1/3 of the full hybrid solution (cf. Table (5)).

===== Nagel's Table S4 =====
Table (5). Exemplary composition of a hybrid nutrient solution modified according to Nagel et al. (Table S4). Full elemental concentration in ppm.

Reference	Ca	Mg	Na	K	B	Mn	Cu	Zn	Mo	Fe	Cl	N	P	S	Comment
Nagel et al. (2020)	200	48.6	0.023	246	0.54	0.55	0.064	0.065	0.048	5.0	0.71	210	31	67	Hybrid nutrient solution

=== Hoagland's legacy ===
Dennis Hoagland was considered a leading authority in his fields of research and his lingering research merit was to initiate and to establish the solution named after him, thereby, creating the basis for a balanced plant nutrition that is still valid today. The Hoagland solution is not only used on earth, but has also proven itself in plant production experiments on the International Space Station. The findings of Hoagland and his associates are relevant to the sustainable use of natural resources such as soil, water and air, water and nutrient use efficiency in crop production and the production of healthy plant foods. Hoagland's fundamental scientific contributions and widely cited publications are of historical relevance to research in modern plant physiology and soil chemistry, which is reflected in the following bibliography.

== Bibliography ==
=== 1912 ===
- The Determination of Aluminum in Feces. With C. L. A. Schmidt. J. Biol. Chem., 11(4) :387–391.

=== 1913 ===
- Studies of the Endogenous Metabolism of the Pig as Modified by Various Factors. I. The Effects of Acid and Basic Salts, and of Free Mineral Acids on the Endogenous Nitrogen Metabolism. With E. V. McCollum. J. Biol. Chem., 16(3) :299–315.
- Studies of the Endogenous Metabolism of the Pig as Modified by Various Factors. II. The Influence of Fat Feeding on Endogenous Nitrogen Metabolism. With E. V. McCollum. J. Biol. Chem., 16(3) :317–320.
- Studies of the Endogenous Metabolism of the Pig as Modified by Various Factors. III. The Influence of Benzoic Acid on the Endogenous Nitrogen Metabolism. With E. V. McCollum. J. Biol. Chem., 16(3) :321–325.

=== 1915 ===
- The Destructive Distillation of Pacific Coast Kelps. J. Ind. Eng. Chem., 7(8) :673–676.
- Organic Constituents of Pacific Coast Kelps. J. Agr. Res., 4(1) :39–58.
- The Complex Carbohydrates and Forms of Sulphur in Marine Algae of the Pacific Coast. With L. L. Lieb. J. Biol. Chem., 23(1) :287–297.

=== 1916 ===
- Acidity and Adsorption in Soils as Measured by the Hydrogen Electrode. With L. T. Sharp. J. Agr. Res., 7 :123–145.

=== 1917 ===
- The Effect of Hydrogen and Hydroxyl Ion Concentration on the Growth of Barley Seedlings. Soil Sci., 3(6) :547–560.

=== 1918 ===
- Relation of Carbon Dioxide to Soil Reaction as Measured by the Hydrogen Electrode. With L. T. Sharp. J. Agr. Res., 12(3) :139–148.
- The Freezing-Point Method as an Index of Variations in the Soil Solution Due to Season and Crop Growth. J. Agr. Res., 12(6) :369–395.
- The Chemical Effects of CaO and CaCO_{3} on the Soil. Part I. The Effect on Soil Reaction. With A. W. Christie. Soil Sci., 5(5) :379–382.
- The Relation of the Plant to the Reaction of the Nutrient Solution. Science, 48(1243) :422–425.

=== 1919 ===
- Notes on Recent Work Concerning Acid Soils. With L. T. Sharp. Soil Sci., 7(3) :197–200.
- Note on the Technique of Solution Culture Experiments with Plants. Science, 49(1267) :360–362.
- The Effect of Certain Aluminum Compounds on the Metabolism of Man. With C. L. A. Schmidt. Univ. Calif. Pub. Path., 2(20) :215–244.
- Table of pH, H^{+}, and OH^{−} Values; Corresponding to Electromotive Forces Determined in Hydrogen Electrode Measurements, with a Bibliography. With C. L. A. Schmidt. Univ. Calif. Pub. Phys., 5(4): 23–69.
- Relation of Nutrient Solution to Composition and Reaction of Cell Sap of Barley. Bot. Gaz., 68(4) :297–304.
- Relation of the Concentration and Reaction of the Nutrient Medium to the Growth and Absorption of the Plant. J. Agr. Res., 18(2) :73–117.^{1}
- The Effect of Several Types of Irrigation Water on the pH Value and Freezing Point Depression of Various Types of Soils. With A. W. Christie. Univ. Calif. Pub. Agr. Sci., 4(6) :141–158.

=== 1920 ===
- Optimum Nutrient Solutions for Plants. Science, 52(1354) :562–564.
- Effect of Season and Crop Growth on the Physical State of the Soil. With J. C. Martin. J. Agr. Res., 20(5) :396-4O3.
- Relation of the Soil Solution to the Soil Extract. With J. C. Martin and G. R. Stewart. J. Agr. Res., 20(5) :381–395.

=== 1922 ===
- The Soil Solution in Relation to the Plant. Trans. Far. Soc., 17(2) :249–254.
- Soil Analysis and Soil and Plant Interrelations. Calif. Agr. Exp. Sta. Cir., 235 :1–8.
- Soil Analysis and Soil and Plant Interrelations. Citrus Leaves, 2(6) :1–2, 16–17.

=== 1923 ===
- The Feeding Power of Plants. With A. R. Davis and C. B. Lipman. Science, 57(1471) :299–301.
- The Composition of the Cell Sap of the Plant in Relation to the Absorption of Ions. With A. R. Davis. J. Gen. Phys., 5(5) :629–646.
- Effect of Salt on the Intake of Inorganic Elements and on the Buffer System of the Plant. With J. C. Martin. Calif. Agr. Exp. Sta. Tech. P., 8 :1–26.
- Further Experiments on the Absorption of Ions by Plants, Including Observations on the Effect of Light. With A. R. Davis. J. Gen. Phys., 6(1) :47–62.
- The Absorption of Ions by Plants. Soil Sci., 16(4) :225–246.
- A Comparison of Sand and Solution Cultures with Soils as Media for Plant Growth. With J. C. Martin. Soil Sci., 16(5) :367–388.
- The Effect of the Plant on the Reaction of the Culture Solution. Calif. Agr. Exp. Sta. Tech. P., 12 :1–16.

=== 1924 ===
- The Electrical Charge on a Clay Colloid as Influenced by Hydrogen-Ion Concentration and by Different Salts. With W. C. Dayhuff. Soil Sci., 18(5) :401–408.

=== 1925 ===
- Suggestions Concerning the Absorption of Ions by Plants. With A. R. Davis. The New Phytologist, 24(2) :99–111.
- Physiological Aspects of Soil Solution Investigations. Calif. Agr. Exp. Sta. Hilg., 1(11) :227–257.

=== 1926 ===
- Some Phases of the Inorganic Nutrition of Plants in Relation to the Soil Solution: 1. The Growth of Plants in Artificial Culture Media. Sci. Agr., 6(5) :141–151.
- Some Phases of the Inorganic Nutrition of Plants in Relation to the Soil Solution: 2. Soil Solutions as Media for Plant Growth. Sci. Agr., 6(6) :177–189.
- Effect of Certain Alkali Salts on Growth of Plants. With J. S. Burd and A. R. Davis. (20) Abstract. Nature and Promise of Soil Solution. (21) Abstract of Papers Read Before Pan-Pacific Scientific Congress, Australia.
- The Influence of Light, Temperature, and Other Conditions on the Ability of Nitella Cells to Concentrate Halogens in the Cell Sap. With P. L. Hibbard and A. R. Davis. J. Gen. Phys., 10(1) :121–146.
- The Investigation of the Soil from the Point of View of the Physiology of the Plant. 4th Int. Conf. Soil Sci. Rome, 1924, 3 :535–544.

=== 1927 ===
- The Synthesis of Vitamin E by Plants Grown in Culture Solutions. With H. M. Evans. Am. J. Phys., 80(3) :702–704.
- Recent Experiments Concerning the Adequacy of Artificial Culture Solutions and of Soil Solutions for the Growth of Different Types of Plants. With J. C. Martin. Proceedings and Papers of the First Int. Cong. Soil Sci., 3 :1–12.
- Resume of Recent Soil Investigations at the University of California. Mo. Bull. Calif. Dept. Agr., 16(11) :562–568.

=== 1928 ===
- First International Congress of Soil Science, Fourth Commission, Soil Fertility. (Summary.) Soil Sci., 25(1) :45–50.
- The Influence of One Ion on the Accumulation of Another by Plant Cells with Special Reference to Experiments with Nitella. With A. R. Davis and P. L. Hibbard. Plant Phys., 3(4) :473–486.
- An Apparatus for the Growth of Plants in Controlled Environment. With A. R. Davis. Plant Phys., 3(3) :277–292.

=== 1929 ===
- Minimum Potassium Level Required by Tomato Plants Grown in Water Cultures. With E. S. Johnston. Soil Sci., 27(2) :89–109.
- The Intake and Accumulation of Electrolytes by Plant Cells. With A. R. Davis. Protoplasma, 6(4) :610–626.

=== 1930 ===
- Fertilizer Problems and Analysis of Soils in California. Calif. Agr. Exp. Sta. Cir., 317 :1–16.
- Accumulation of Mineral Elements by Plant Cells. Contrib. Marine Biol., pp. 131–144.
- Recent Advances in Plant Physiology. Ecology, 11(4) :785–786.

=== 1931 ===
- Little-Leaf or Rosette in Fruit Trees, I. With W. H. Chandler and P. L. Hibbard. Proc. Am. Soc. Hort. Sci., 28 :556–560.
- Absorption of Mineral Elements by Plants in Relation to Soil Problems. Plant Phys., 6(3) :373–388.

=== 1932 ===
- Little-Leaf or Rosette of Fruit Trees, II: Effect of Zinc and Other Treatments. With W. H. Chandler and P. L. Hibbard. Proc. Am. Soc. Hort. Sci., 29 :255–263.
- Mineral Nutrition of Plants. Annu. Rev. Biochem., 1 :618–636.
- Some Effects of Deficiencies of Phosphate and Potassium on the Growth and Composition of Fruit Trees under Controlled Conditions. With W. H. Chandler. Proc. Am. Soc. Hort. Sci., 29 :267–271.

=== 1933 ===
- Little-Leaf or Rosette of Fruit Trees, III. With W. H. Chandler and P. L. Hibbard. Proc. Am. Soc. Hort. Sci., 30 :70–86.
- Mineral Nutrition of Plants. Annu. Rev. Biochem., 2 :471–484.
- Nutrition of Strawberry Plant under Controlled Conditions. (a) Effects of Deficiencies of Boron and Certain Other Elements, (b) Susceptibility to Injury from Sodium Salts. With W. C. Snyder. Proc. Am. Soc. Hort. Sci., 30 :288–294.
- Absorption of Potassium by Plants in Relation to Replaceable, Non-Replaceable, and Soil Solution Potassium. With J. C. Martin. Soil Sci., 36 :1–33.
- Methods for Determining Availability of Potassium with Special Reference to Semi-Arid Soils. Trans. 2nd Commission and Alkali Subcommission of the International Soc. Soil Sci. Kjobenhavn (Danmark). Vol. A, pp. 25–31.

=== 1934 ===
- Little-Leaf or Rosette of Fruit Trees, IV. With W. H. Chandler and P. L. Hibbard. Proc. Am. Soc. Hort. Sci., 32 :11–19.
- The Potassium Nutrition of Barley with Special Reference to California Soils. Proc. Fifth Pacific Science Congress, pp. 2669–2676.

=== 1935 ===
- Little-Leaf or Rosette of Fruit Trees, V: Effect of Zinc on the Growth of Plants of Various Types in Controlled Soil and Water Culture Experiments. With W. H. Chandler and P. L. Hibbard. Proc. Am. Soc. Hort. Sci., 33 :131–141.
- Comments on the Article by A Kozlowski on "Little Leaf or Rosette of Fruit Trees in California". With W. H. Chandler. Phytopathology, 25(5) :522-522
- Absorption of Potassium by Plants and Fixation by the Soil in Relation to Certain Methods for Estimating Available Nutrients. With J. C. Martin. Trans. Third Inter. Cong. Soil Sci., 1 :99–103.

=== 1936 ===
- Little-Leaf or Rosette of Fruit Trees, VI: Further Experiments Bearing on the Cause of the Disease. With W. H. Chandler and P. R. Stout. Proc. Am. Soc. Hort. Sci., 34 :210–212.
- The Plant as a Metabolic Unit in the Soil-Plant System. Essays in Geobotany in Honor of Wm. A. Setchell. Univ. Calif. Press, pp. 219–245.
- General Nature of the Process of Salt Accumulation by Roots with Description of Experimental Methods. With T. C. Broyer. Plant Phys., 11(3) :471–507.

=== 1937 ===
- Some Aspects of the Salt Nutrition of Higher Plants. Bot. Rev., 3 :307–334.

=== 1938 ===
- The Water-Culture Method for Growing Plants without Soil. With D. I. Arnon. Calif. Agr. Exp. Sta. Cir., 347, pp. 1–39.*
- Fertilizer Problems and Analysis of Soils in California. Calif. Agr. Exp. Sta. Cir., 317 :1–16 (Revision).

=== 1939 ===
- A Comparison of Water Culture and Soil as Media for Crop Production. With D. I. Arnon. Science, 89 :512–514.
- Upward and Lateral Movement of Salt in Certain Plants as Indicated by Radioactive Isotopes of Potassium, Sodium, and Phosphorus Absorbed by Roots. With P. R. Stout. Am. J. Bot., 26(5) :320–324.
- Metabolism and Salt Absorption by Plants. With F. C. Steward. Nature, 143 :1031–1032.

=== 1940 ===
- Salt Absorption by Plants. With F. C. Steward. Nature, 145 :116–117.
- Hydrogen-Ion Effects and the Accumulation of Salt by Barley Roots as Influenced by Metabolism. With T. C. Broyer. Am. J. Bot., 27 :173–185.
- Upward Movement of Salt in the Plant. With T. C. Broyer and P. R. Stout. Nature, 146 :340-340.
- Minute Amounts of Chemical Elements in Relation to Plant Growth. Science, 91 :557–560.
- Methods of Sap Expression from Plant Tissues with Special Reference to Studies on Salt Accumulation by Excised Barley Roots. With T. C. Broyer. Am. J. Bot., 27(7) :501–511.
- Crop Production in Artificial Culture Solutions and in Soils with Special Reference to Factors Influencing Yields and Absorption of Inorganic Nutrients. With D. I. Arnon. Soil Sci., 50(1) :463–485.
- Salt Accumulation by Plant Cells with Special Reference to Metabolism and Experiments on Barley Roots. Cold Spring Harbor Symposia on Quantitative Biology, Vol. 8.
- Some Modern Advances in the Study of Plant Nutrition. Proc. Am. Soc. Sugar Beet Tech., Part 1 :18–26.

=== 1941 ===
- Water Culture Experiments on Molybdenum and Copper Deficiencies of Fruit Trees. Proc. Am. Soc. Hort. Sci., 38 :8–12.
- Physiological Aspects of Availability of Nutrients for Plant Growth. With D. I. Arnon. Soil Sci., 51(1) :431–444.
- Aspects of Progress in the Study of Plant Nutrition. Trop. Agr., 18 :247.

=== 1942 ===
- Accumulation of Salt and Permeability in Plant Cells. With T. C. Broyer. J. Gen. Physiol., 25(6) :865–880.

=== 1943 ===
- Metabolic Activities of Roots and Their Bearing on the Relation of Upward Movement of Salts and Water in Plants. With T. C. Broyer. Am. J. Bot., 30(4) :261–273.
- Composition of the Tomato Plant as Influenced by Nutrient Supply, in Relation to Fruiting. With D. I. Arnon. Bot. Gaz., 104(4) :576–590.

=== 1944 ===
- General Aspects of the Study of Plant Nutrition. Sci. Univ. Calif., pp. 279–294.
- The Investigation of Plant Nutrition by Artificial Culture Methods. With D. I. Arnon. Biol. Rev. Cambr. Phil. Soc., 19(2) :55–67.
- Lectures on the Inorganic Nutrition of Plants. (Prather Lectures at Harvard University). Published by Chronica Botanica Co. Waltham, Mass.

=== 1945 ===
- Molybdenum in Relation to Plant Growth. Soil Sci., 60(2) :119–123.
- Potassium Fixation in Soils in Replaceable and Non-Replaceable Forms in Relation to Chemical Reactions in the Soil. With J. C. Martin and R. Overstreet. Soil Sci. Soc. Am. Proc., 10 :94–101.

=== 1946 ===
- The Nutrition and Biochemistry of Plants, Currents in Biochemical Research. Interscience Publ. Inc. N. Y., pp. 61–77.
- Little-Leaf or Rosette of Fruit Trees, VIII: Zinc and Copper Deficiency in Corral Soils. With W. H. Chandler and J. C. Martin. Proc. Am. Soc. Hort. Sci., 47 :15–19.

=== 1947 ===
- Trace Elements in Plants and Animals by Walter Stiles. Rev. Arch. Biochem., 13 :311–312.
- Fertilizers, Soil Analysis, and Plant Nutrition. Calif. Agr. Exp. Sta. Cir., 367 :1–24.

=== 1948 ===
- Minute Amounts of "Minor" Elements Essential in Addition to "Regular" Fertilizer. Agr. Chem.
- Some Problems of Plant Nutrition. With D. I. Arnon. Sci. Mo., 67(3) :201–209.

=== 1949 ===
- Fertilizers, Soil Analysis, and Plant Nutrition. Calif. Agr. Exp. Sta. Cir., 367 :1–24 (Revision).

=== 1950 (posthumous) ===
- Absorption and Utilization of Inorganic Substances in Plants. With P. R. Stout. Chap. VIII of Agricultural Chemistry, ed. by Frear, Van Nostrand.
- The Water-Culture Method for Growing Plants without Soil. With D. I. Arnon. Calif. Agr. Exp. Sta. Cir., 347, pp. 1–32 (Revision).**
- Availability of Potassium to Crops in Relation to Replaceable and Non-Replaceable Potassium and to Effects of Cropping and Organic Matter. With J. C. Martin. Soil Sci. Soc. Am. Proc., 15 :272–278.

Courtesy of The National Academy of Sciences Archives, and without these entries it would not have been possible.
