= Daniel I. Arnon =

Polish-American plant physiologist (1910–1994)

Daniel Israel Arnon
- Born: November 14, 1910; Warsaw, Poland
- Died: December 20, 1994 (aged 84); Berkeley, California, US
- Education: University of California, Berkeley
- Known for: Photophosphorylation; Plant nutrition Molybdenum; Vanadium; Water culture Hoagland solution
- Spouse: Lucile Soulé
- Awards: Arnon Lecture (2000); National Medal of Science (1973); Nobel Prize (1967, nominated); Stephen Hales Prize (1966); Newcomb Cleveland Prize (1940)
- Scientific career
- Fields: Plant physiology Plant nutrition
- Workplaces: University of California, Berkeley
- Doctoral advisor: Dennis Robert Hoagland

Daniel Israel Arnon (November 14, 1910 – December 20, 1994) was a Polish-born American plant physiologist and National Medal of Science recipient whose research led to greater insights into the operation of photosynthesis and nutrition in plants.

In the first part of his professional career, the so-called "Plant Nutrition Years (1936-1950)", Arnon and collaborators discovered the essentiality of molybdenum for the growth of all plants and of vanadium for the growth of green algae. In the second one, the so-called "Photosynthesis Period (1951-1978)", plant micronutrient work led him to photosynthesis.

In 1954, Arnon, Mary Belle Allen and Frederick Robert Whatley discovered photophosphorylation in vitro. In 1967, for this work, he was nominated jointly with Allen and Whatley for a Nobel Prize in Chemistry.

== Early life and education ==
Arnon was born on November 14, 1910, in Warsaw, Poland, to a Jewish family. Summers spent on the family's farm helped foster Arnon's interest in agriculture. His father had lost the family's food wholesale business after World War I. Reading about scientific agriculture in the works of Jack London, led him to save his money and apply to the University of California in the United States of America.

== Career ==
Arnon enrolled as a student in the University of California from Poland, and would spend his entire professional career at the university, until his retirement in 1978. He earned his Bachelor's degree in 1932 and his Ph.D. in plant physiology in 1936 at UC Berkeley under the supervision of Dennis R. Hoagland.

Some of Arnon's earliest research focused on growing plants in nutrient-enriched water rather than soil. Together with his supervisor, he further developed the Hoagland solution which was published in modified form as Hoagland's solution (1, 2) in 1938. After Hoagland's death, it was further revised by Arnon in 1950. Arnon became an assistant professor at the University of California in 1941.

During World War II, Arnon served as a major in the Army Air Corps of the United States Army and was sent to the Pacific Theater of Operations. From 1943 to 1946 he used his prior experience with plant nutrition on Ponape Island, where there was no arable land available. He was able to grow food to feed the troops stationed there using gravel and nutrient-enriched water.

After returning from military service in 1946, Arnon became an associate professor of cell physiology at the University of California, Berkeley. He investigated plant nutrition and the contributions of micronutrients such as molybdenum for the growth of all plants and of vanadium for the growth of green algae.

In the 1950s, Arnon performed research with Mary Belle Allen and F. Robert Whatley on chloroplasts and their role in photosynthesis, identifying a process which they named "photosynthetic phosphorylation". The group demonstrated how energy from sunlight is used to form adenosine triphosphate, the energy transport messenger within living cells, by adding a third phosphorus group to adenosine diphosphate. In 1954, they reproduced the process in a laboratory, making them the first to successfully demonstrate the chemical function of photosynthesis, producing sugar and starch from inputs of carbon dioxide and water in vitro.

Arnon served as president of the American Society of Plant Physiologists from 1952 to 1953. Arnon served as the editor of the Annual Review of Plant Physiology (now the Annual Review of Plant Biology) for 1956.

== Awards ==
In 1940, together with Dennis Hoagland, Arnon received the AAAS Newcomb Cleveland Prize for the work "Availability of Nutrients with Special Reference to Physiological Aspects".

In 1961, Arnon was elected to the National Academy of Sciences, in 1962 to the American Academy of Arts and Sciences, and in 1974 to the Leopoldina.

In 1966, he received the Stephen Hales Prize, and in 1967, he was nominated jointly with Mary Belle Allen and Frederick Robert Whatley for a Nobel Prize in Chemistry.

In 1973, he was awarded the National Medal of Science for "his fundamental research into the mechanism of green plant utilization of light to produce chemical energy and oxygen and for contributions to our understanding of plant nutrition."

The Arnon Lecture has been held annually at UC Berkeley since 2000 in early March in honour of the late Professor Daniel I. Arnon. Speakers have made significant contributions to photosynthesis or a related field and are selected by the Arnon Lecture Committee.

== Family ==
A resident of Kensington, California, Arnon died at age 84 on December 20, 1994, in Berkeley, California, of complications resulting from cardiac arrest. He had three daughters and two sons. His wife, the former Lucile Soulé, died in 1986.
