= CI-1017 =

Chemical compound

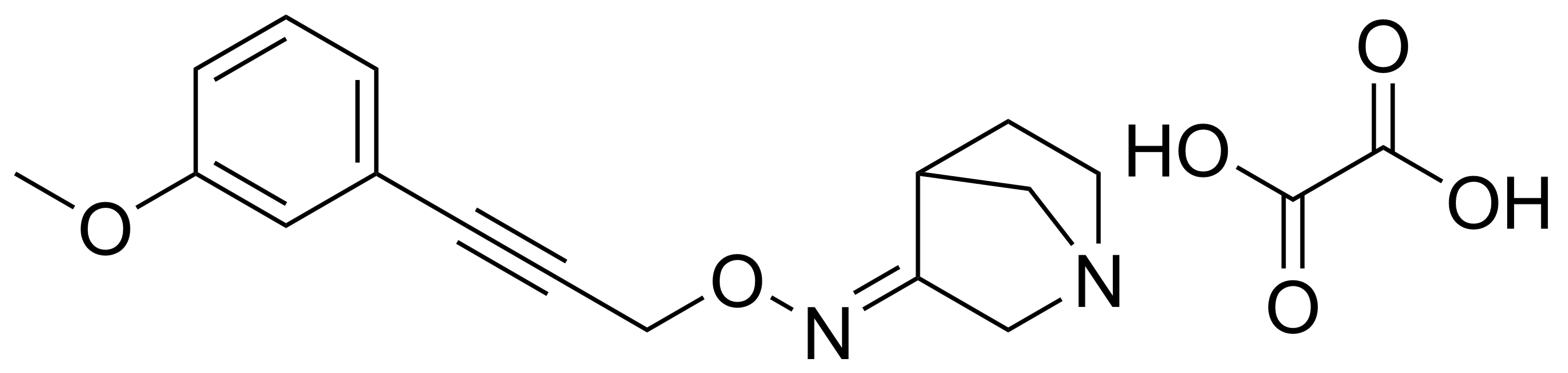

Clinical data
- ATC code: none

Identifiers
- IUPAC name: (3E)-1-azabicyclo[2.2.1]heptan-3-one O-[3-(3-methoxyphenyl)prop-2-yn-1-yl]oxime ethanedioate
- CAS Number: 161774-09-0
- PubChem CID: 6505360
- ChemSpider: 5005355

Chemical and physical data
- Formula: C_{18}H_{20}N_{2}O_{6}
- Molar mass: 360.366 g·mol^{−1}
- 3D model (JSmol): Interactive image
- SMILES: O=C(O)C(=O)O.O(\N=C1\CN2CC1CC2)CC#Cc3cccc(OC)c3

CI-1017 is a muscarinic acetylcholine receptor agonist which is selective for and is approximately equipotent at the M_{1} and M_{4} receptors, with 20-30-fold lower affinity for the M_{2}, M_{3}, and M_{5} subtypes It is the (R)-enantiomer of the racemic compound PD-142,505.

In animals CI-1017 improves learning and memory and increases the electrical activity of the hippocampus through activation of the M_{1} receptor, while minimally producing parasympathetic side effects and only at very high doses. It also inhibits production of amyloidogenic A beta peptide and increases secretion of soluble amyloid precursor protein via stimulation of the M_{1} receptor as well. Based on these data, it was hypothesized that CI-1017 could not only treat the symptoms of Alzheimer's disease, but could also potentially slow disease progression. It was tested in clinical trials for this purpose in the early 2000s but was abandoned due to lack of efficacy.
