= Sterculinine =

Chemical compound

Names
- IUPAC name 4-Butyl N-(2-oxo-1,2-dihydroquinoline-4-carbonyl)-L-aspartate
- Systematic IUPAC name (2R)-4-Butoxy-4-oxo-2-(2-oxo-1,2-dihydroquinoline-4-carboxamido)butanoic acid

Identifiers
CAS Number	600166-05-0
3D model (JSmol)	Interactive image
ChemSpider	552922
PubChem CID	637291
CompTox Dashboard (EPA)	DTXSID001336393
- InChI: InChI=1S/C18H20N2O6/c1-2-3-8-26-16(22)10-14(18(24)25)20-17(23)12-9-15(21)19-13-7-5-4-6-11(12)13/h4-7,9,14H,2-3,8,10H2,1H3,(H,19,21)(H,20,23)(H,24,25)/t14-/m1/s1 Key: YUEGCMDJZXZCID-CQSZACIVSA-N
- SMILES: CCCCOC(=O)C[C@H](C(=O)O)NC(=O)C1=CC(=O)NC2=CC=CC=C21

Properties
Chemical formula	C_{18}H_{20}N_{2}O_{6}
Molar mass	360.366 g·mol^{−1}
- Except where otherwise noted, data are given for materials in their standard state (at 25 °C [77 °F], 100 kPa). Infobox references

Sterculinine is an alkaloid isolated from the Chinese drug Pangdahai (an extract of Sterculia lychnophora).
