= EDDHA =

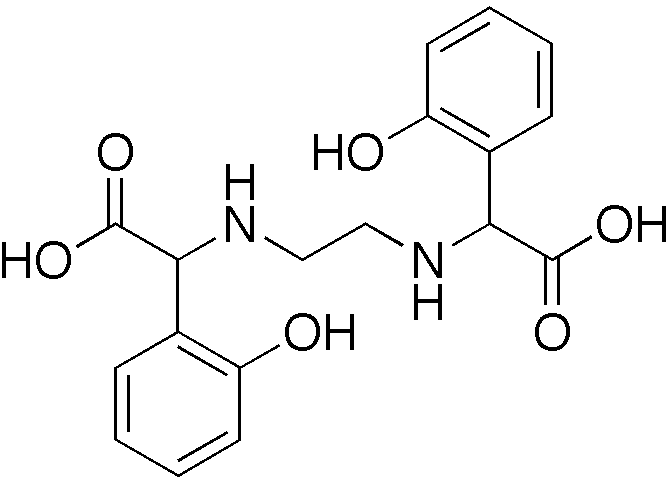

Names
- IUPAC name 2-[2-[[2-Hydroxy-1-(2-hydroxyphenyl)-2-oxoethyl]amino]ethylamino]-2-(2-hydroxyphenyl)acetic acid
- Other names Ethylenediamine-N,N'-bis(2-hydroxyphenylacetic acid

Identifiers
CAS Number	1170-02-1
3D model (JSmol)	Interactive image; Interactive image
ChEMBL	ChEMBL21178
ChemSpider	13782
ECHA InfoCard	100.013.296
PubChem CID	14432
CompTox Dashboard (EPA)	DTXSID30864677
- InChI: InChI=1S/C18H20N2O6/c21-13-7-3-1-5-11(13)15(17(23)24)19-9-10-20-16(18(25)26)12-6-2-4-8-14(12)22/h1-8,15-16,19-22H,9-10H2,(H,23,24)(H,25,26) Key: PZZHMLOHNYWKIK-UHFFFAOYSA-N; InChI=1/C18H20N2O6/c21-13-7-3-1-5-11(13)15(17(23)24)19-9-10-20-16(18(25)26)12-6-2-4-8-14(12)22/h1-8,15-16,19-22H,9-10H2,(H,23,24)(H,25,26) Key: PZZHMLOHNYWKIK-UHFFFAOYAQ
- SMILES: C1=CC=C(C(=C1)C(C(=O)O)NCCNC(C2=CC=CC=C2O)C(=O)O)O; O=C(O)C(NCCNC(c1ccccc1O)C(=O)O)c2ccccc2O

Properties
Chemical formula	C_{18}H_{20}N_{2}O_{6}
Molar mass	360.366 g·mol^{−1}
Appearance	White solid
- Except where otherwise noted, data are given for materials in their standard state (at 25 °C [77 °F], 100 kPa). verify (what is ?) Infobox references

EDDHA or ethylenediamine-N,N′-bis(2-hydroxyphenylacetic acid) is a chelating agent. Like EDTA, it binds metal ions as a hexadentate ligand, using two amines, two phenolate centers, and two carboxylates as the six binding sites. The complexes are typically anionic. The ligand itself is a white, water-soluble powder. Both the free ligand and its tetraanionic chelating agent are abbreviated EDDHA. In contrast to EDDHA, most related aminopolycarboxylic acid chelating agents feature tertiary amines and few have phenolate groups.

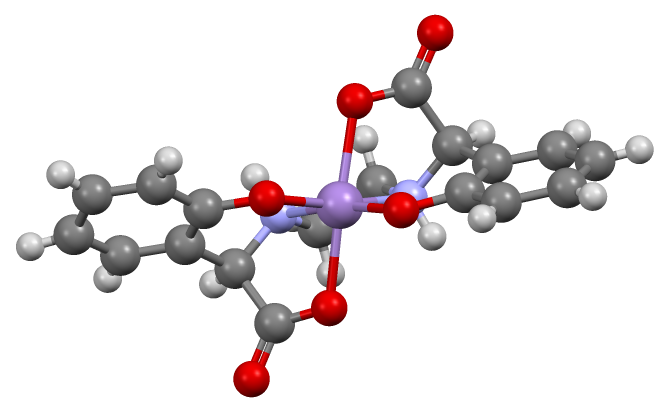
Structure of anion [Mn(EDDHA)]^{−}, which is representative of related C_{2}-symmetric complexes.

== Preparation ==
It is produced by the multicomponent reaction of phenol, glyoxalic acid, and ethylenediamine. In this process, the initial Schiff base condensate alkylates the phenol. Related ligands can be prepared more efficiently using para-cresol.

== Uses ==
It is used to mobilize metal ions analogously to the use of EDTA.

EDDHA has been used in phytoextraction of lead from contaminated soils. It degrades with release of salicylic acid.
