= Altenau, Lower Saxony =

Stadtteil of Clausthal-Zellerfeld in Lower Saxony, Germany

Altenau
- Stadtteil of Clausthal-Zellerfeld
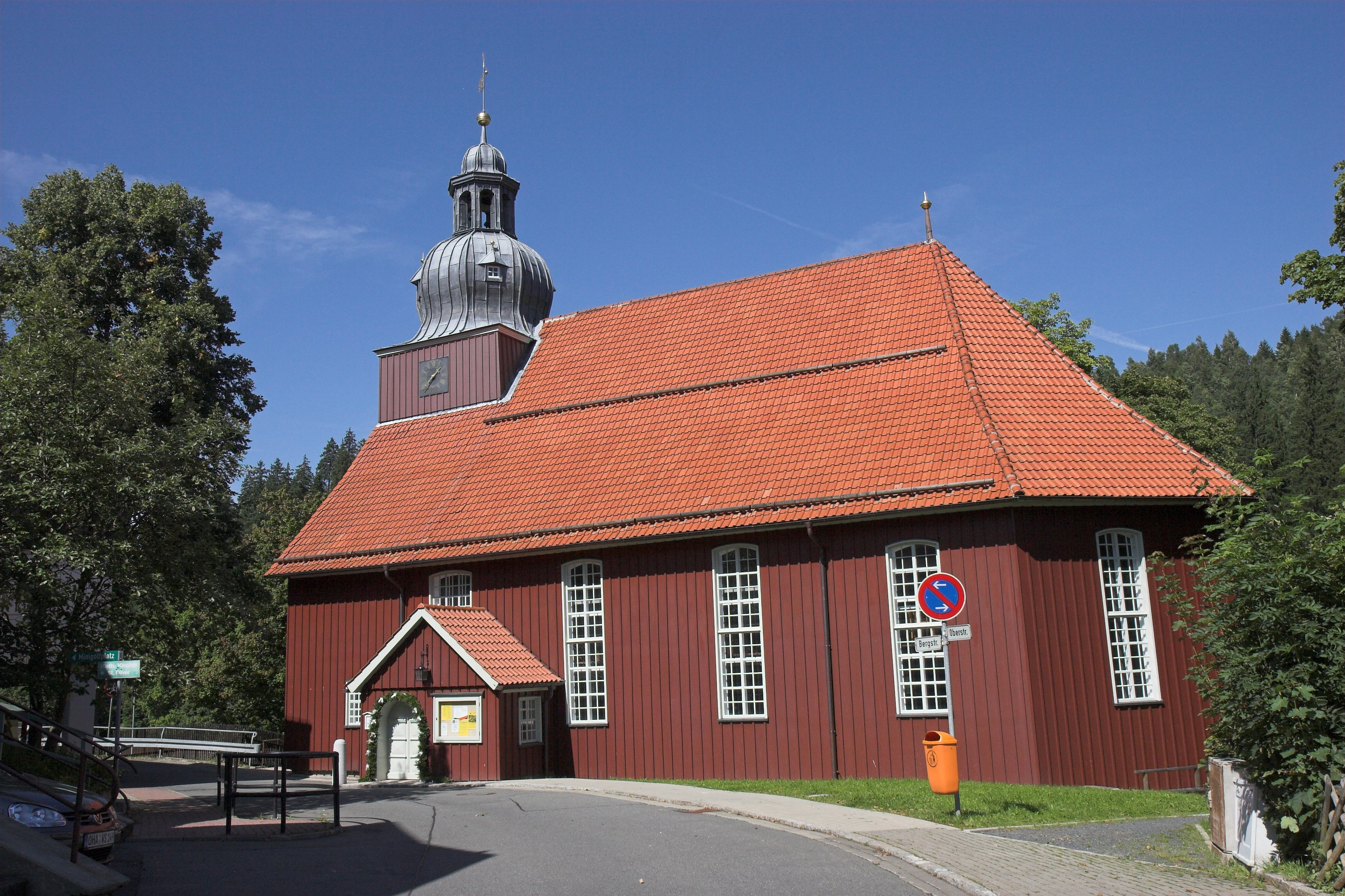
- Saint Nicholas Church

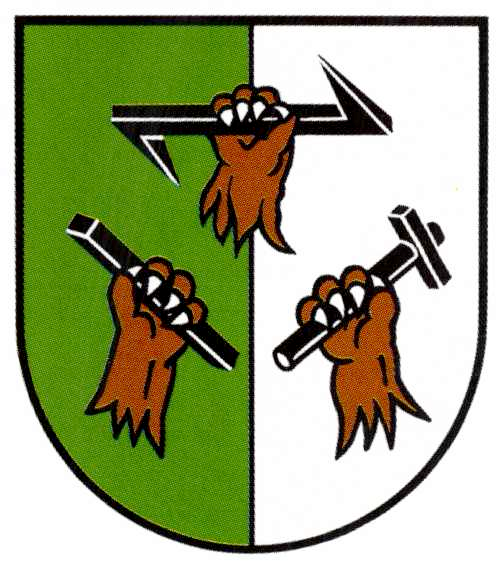
- Coat of arms
- Interactive map of Altenau
- Location within Germany Location within Lower Saxony
- Coordinates: 51°48′10″N 10°26′44″E
- Country: Germany
- State: Lower Saxony
- District: Goslar
- Town: Clausthal-Zellerfeld
- Subdivisions: 2 districts

Area
  - Total: 4.66 km^{2} (1.80 sq mi)
- Elevation: 460 m (1,510 ft)

Population (2014-12-31)
  - Total: 1,758
  - Density: 377/km^{2} (977/sq mi)
- Time zone: UTC+01:00 (CET)
  - Summer (DST): UTC+02:00 (CEST)
- Postal codes: 38707
- Dialling codes: 05328
- Vehicle registration: GS
- Website: www.altenau.info

Altenau (German pronunciation: [ˈaltənaʊ]) is a town and a former municipality in the district of Goslar, in Lower Saxony, Germany. Since 1 January 2015 it is part of the town Clausthal-Zellerfeld.

It is situated in the middle of the Harz mountains, between Clausthal-Zellerfeld and the Brocken. It was part of the former Samtgemeinde ("collective municipality") Oberharz.

== Geography ==
=== Districts ===
- Altenau
- Torfhaus

== History ==
Altenau is an old mining town. First references about the town came in 1227 and later in 1298 and 1311. Also, in 1525 the first settler came to Altenau and founded a shooting club to protect themselves from attacks from local bandits. In 1532 the first mining at the area of Altenau was founded, later in 1540 and 1570 the minings Schatzkammer and Rose grow up. In the year 1579 Altenau got the first Preaster. At this time, Altenau was a village with 20 houses. In 1588, the first church was built, but it was taken down in 1669 to make today's Saint Nicolai Church. Later in 1617, Altenau got city law and grow up. The local mines end up in 1800, the smelter from 1690 ended in 1911. The first Tourism starts at the same time. In the 1970s the holiday residence Glockenberg was built by Philipp Holzmann . Today you will find in Altenau many hotels, shops, restaurants, a brewery from 1617, the Swimminghall from 2008 and the biggest park of herbs and spices (Kräuterpark).

=== Demographics ===
Year	Inhabitants
1821	1,244
1848	1,963
1871	2,179
1885	2,145
1905	2,091
1925	1,914

Year	Inhabitants
1933	1,947
1939	2,505
1946	2,744
1950	2,717
1956	2,442

Year	Inhabitants
1961	2,304
1968	2,209
1970	2,250
1975	2,500
1980	2,522

Year	Inhabitants
1985	2,541
1990	2,405
1995	2,287
2000	2,146
2005	1,980
2010	1,770
2013	1,643
2018	1,758

== Sights ==
- Saint Nicholas Church, a Protestant wooden church with three naves, built in 1670
- The modern Catholic Saint Oliver Church of Altenau, built in 1976
- Park of Herbs and Spices
- Downtown with many wooden houses from the area of the 17th century.
- Brewery from 1617
- Swimminghall
- The former railway station of Altenau, a wooden building dating from 1914

=== Personals ===
- Wilhelm Knop
- Adolf Knop
- Hermine Hartleben

== Politics ==
=== Town council ===
2006 local elections:

- SPD: 7 seats (54.16%)
- CDU: 6 seats (45.84%)
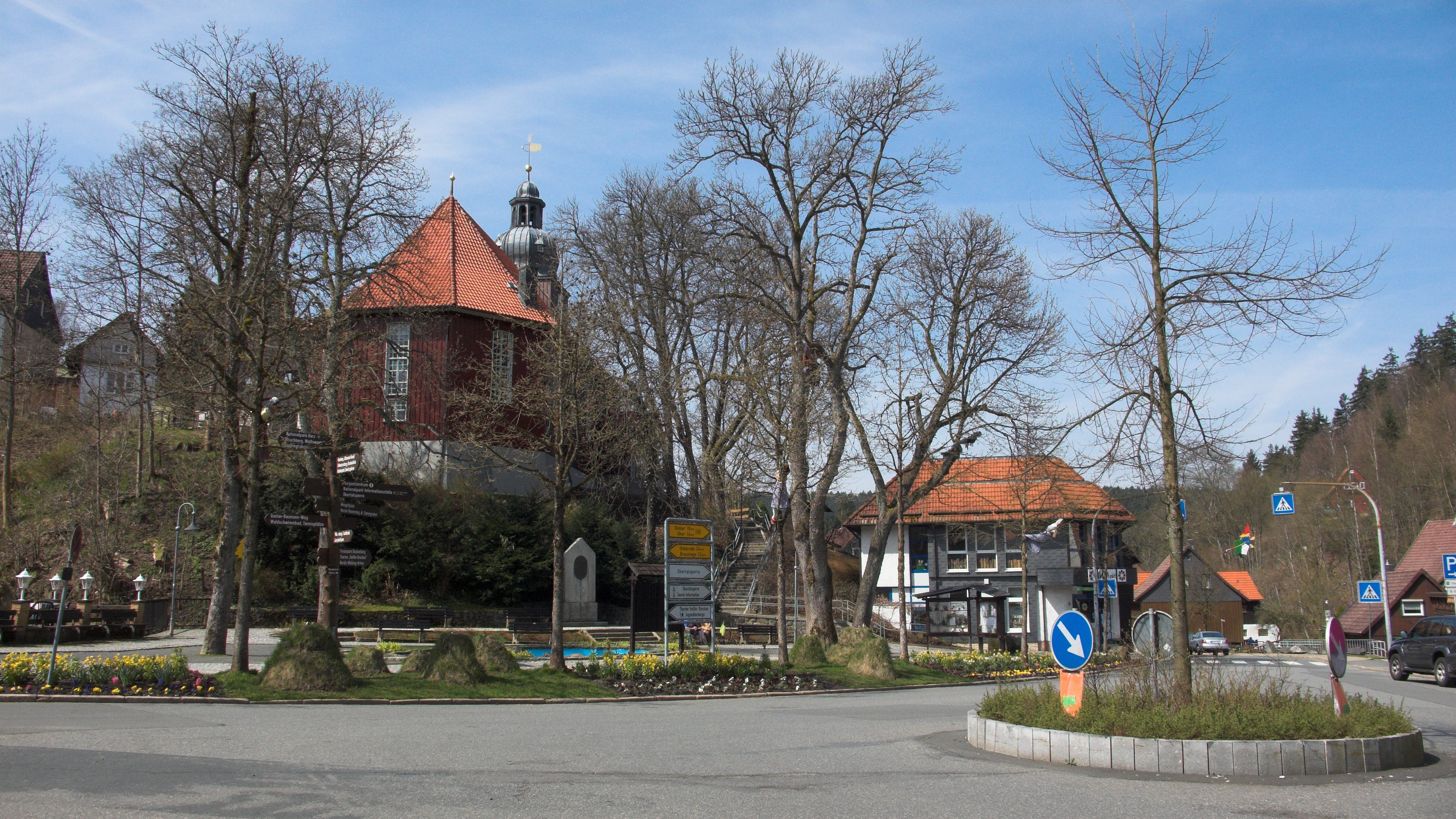
Town center

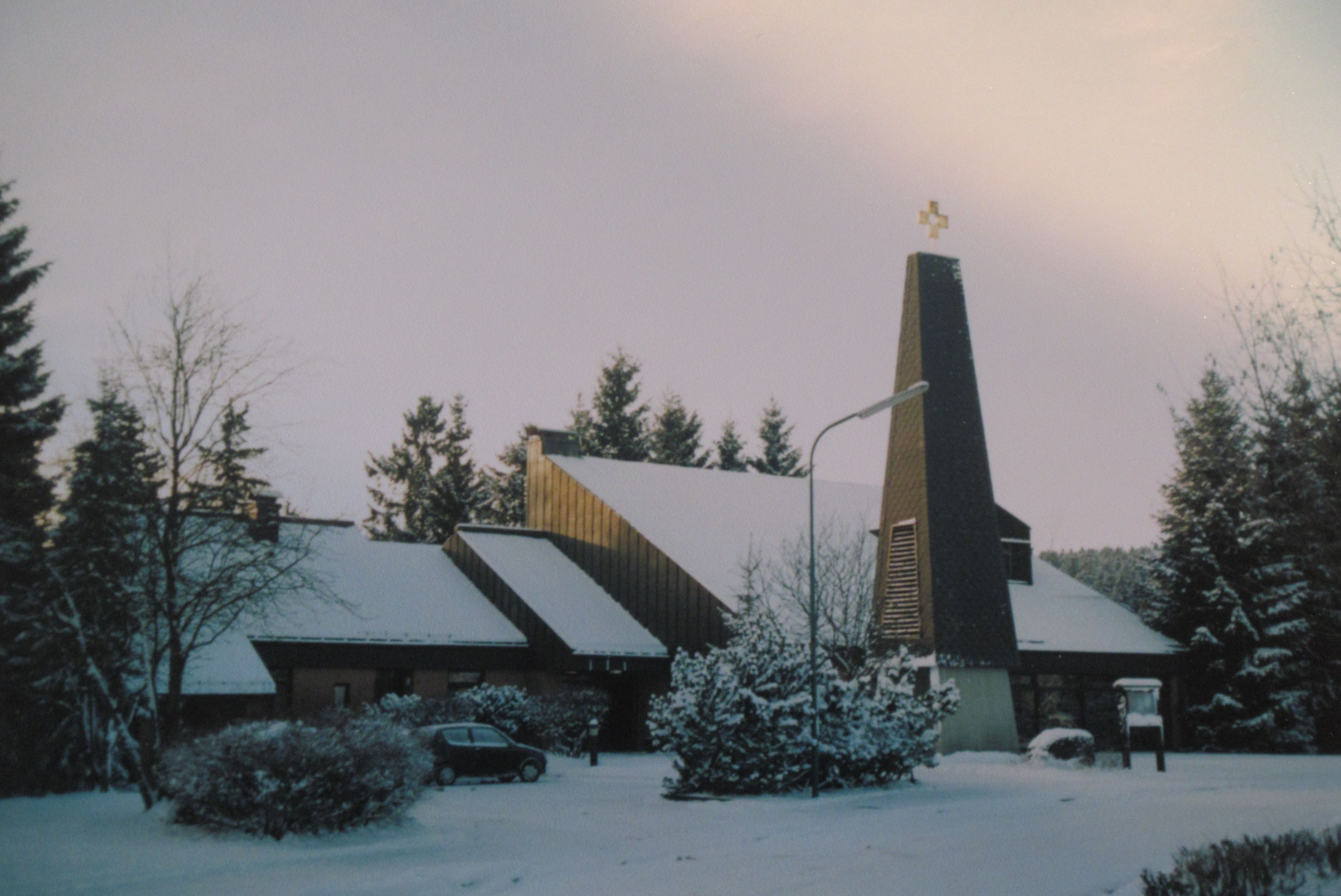
Saint Oliver Church

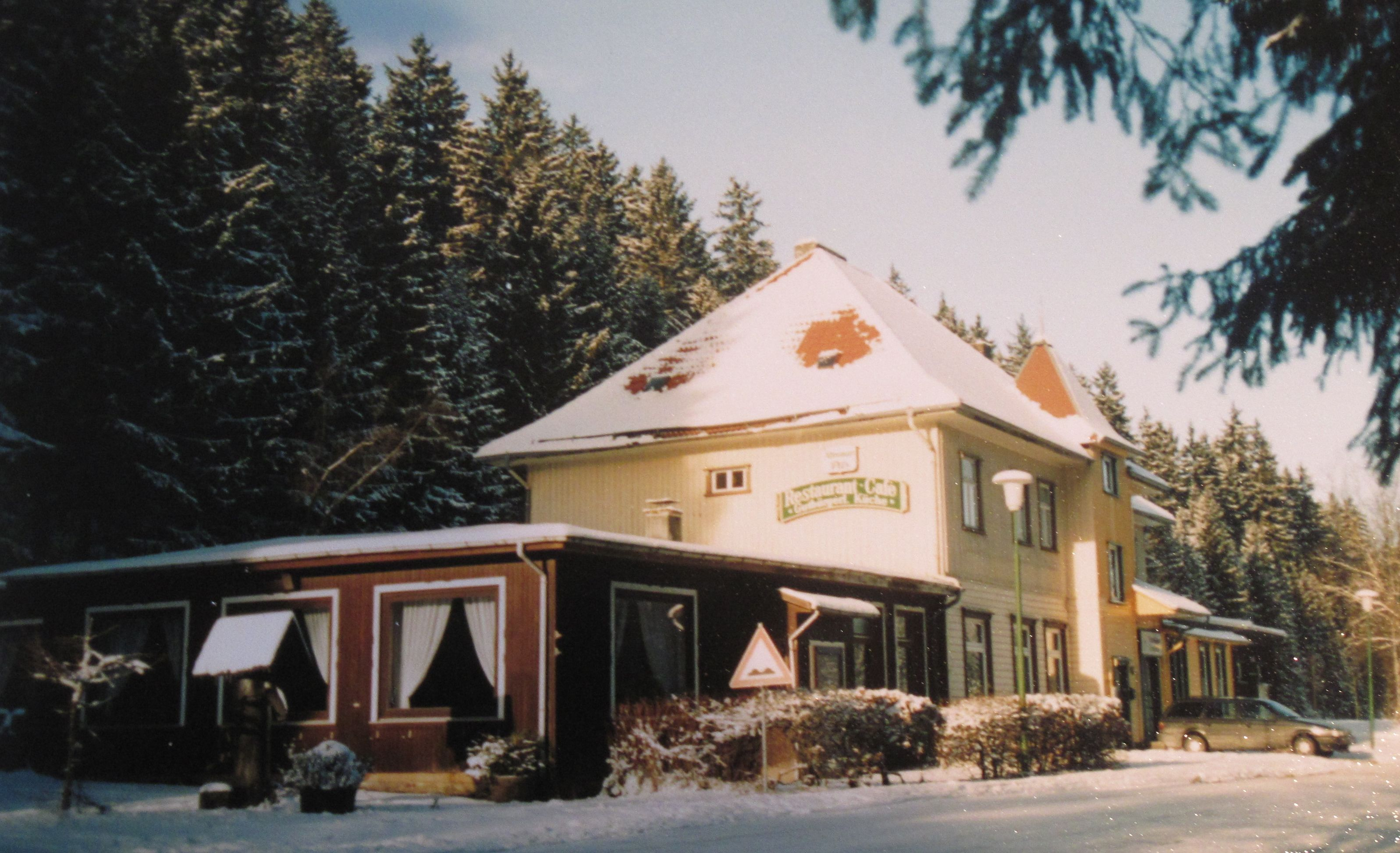
Former railway station

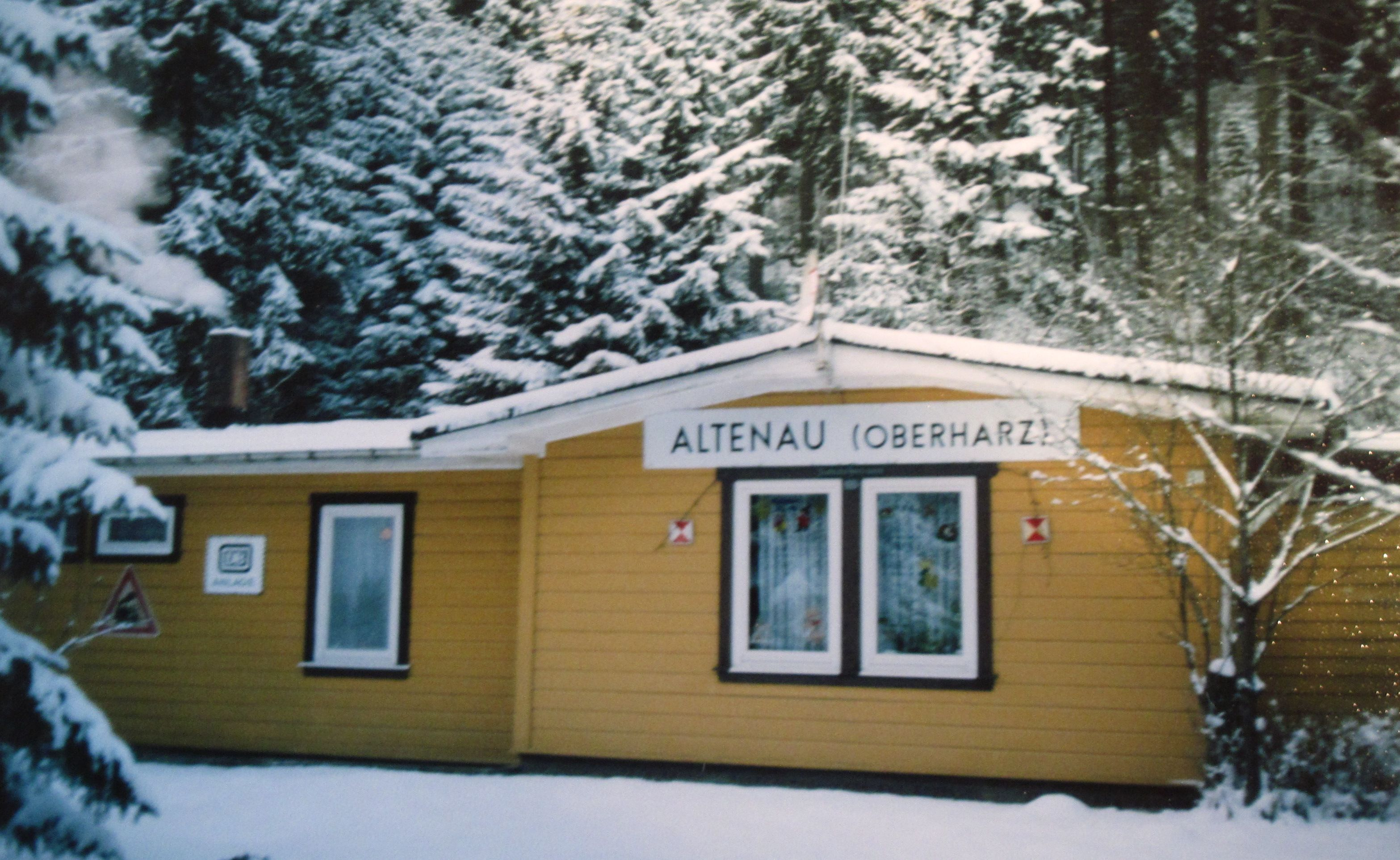
Side building, former railway station
