= Revierwasserlaufanstalt Freiberg =

The Revierwasserlaufanstalt Freiberg (approximately: "Freiberg Mines Water Management System") or RWA Freiberg, was a historical water management system that delivered driving water to the Freiberg mines in the time of the German Electorate and later Kingdom of Saxony. Today the system is used to supply drinking and industrial water and is operated by the Saxony State Reservoir Office (Landestalsperrenverwaltung Sachsen).

The Revierwasseranstalt Freiberg has been selected as a candidate for the future UNESCO World Heritage Site of the Ore Mountain Mining Region (Montanregion Erzgebirge).

== History ==
=== Early history ===
The beginnings of the Revierwasserlaufanstalt coincide with the start of mining in the Freiberg region in 1168. The term "water management" in this case embraces the many facilities laid out and expanded time and again to handle water for the mining industry, such as ditches (Kunstgräben), water tunnels (Röschen) and ponds or reservoirs (Kunstteiche), that supplied water to the pits, stamp mills and smelteries.

=== 1557–1853 ===
About 1557, Martin Planer began the systematic upgrade of the water management facilities that had hitherto been laid out. This is the starting point for the facilities of the Revierwasserlaufanstalt, a system that is still in operation today. The usual term for this concept at the time was Wasserversorgung ("water supply"); but from about 1846 the term Revierwasserversorgung ("mining area water supply") was used. From about 1684 the Electoral Adit and Gullet Administration of Freiberg (Kurfürstliche Stolln- und Röschen-Administration zu Freiberg), established by Prince-Elector John George III, was made responsible for water supply facilities, overseen by the Saxon Mining Office (Sächsisches Oberbergamt). It was during that time that facilities such as the Kuhschachter Teich, the Zethauer Kunstgraben, the Große Großhartmannsdorfer Teich, the Müdisdorfer Kunstgraben und Rösche, the Erzengler Teich and the Hohbirker Kunstgraben were built. Because the demand for driving water grew rapidly, when this could be provided by the ever-growing system of ditches the division of water available was optimised. In order to make this comprehensible, the amount of water allocated to individual consumers had to be measured. This led, in the 18th century, to the introduction of a new unit of measurement, the "wheel of water" (Rad Wasser) whereby 100 cubic foot/min = 37.85 L/s). Another control mechanism was the water tax (Wassersteuer) where, in 1853, one Lachterrad (37.85l/s at 2 m drop in height for one year =1.194 Mio. m³/year) cost 20 taler.

=== 1853–1913 ===
Under §283 of the law covering the mining by royal assent in the Kingdom of Saxony dated 22 May 1851 the Kurfürst-Johann-Georg-Stolln, the Tiefe Fürstenstolln, the Thelersberger Stolln, the Alte tiefe Fürstenstolln, the Dörnthaler Wasserleitung, the Junger Fürst zu Sachsen Müdisdorfer Rösche, the Martelbacher Rösche the Muldenwasser-Versorgung "with all their fixtures of smelteries, mills, water tunnels, ponds, adits and galleries, whose rights and responsibilities (Rutzungen) and even their entire assets" were transferred to the "Gesammteigenthum des Freiberger Reviers" which had the title of "Revierwasserlaufsanstalt".

== Modern purpose ==
The ponds or Kunstteiche used to provide water for the mining industry in the Freiberg Mining Field, in order to drive water wheels and stamp mills and to wash the ore. They are connected to one another by around 50 km of ditches (Kunstgräben) and mining water tunnels (Röschen). The Upper RWA supplies drinking water, the Lower RWA industrial water. The RWA system also transfers today water from the Rauschenbach Reservoir to the Saidenbach Reservoir in order to supply the great residential and industrial area of Chemnitz. In addition, water is transferred from the Oberer Großhartmannsdorfer Teich via the Lichtenberg Reservoir and from there to the Klingenberg Reservoir and into the Dresden area.

== Construction ==
The dams of the RWA are earth-fill dams or homogeneous dams with impervious clay cores or clay blankets on the upstream side. The dams are very wide and have steep faces. The downstream, grass-covered faces are sometimes supported by stone arches. On the upstream face the dams have a stone wall (a so-called Tarrasmauer) to guard against waves. To release the water there is a valve (Striegel) operated from the valve house (Striegelhaus) by a winch and spindle.

== RWA reservoirs ==
Today the RWA has 10 ponds or reservoirs that are operated by the Saxony State Reservoir Agency (Landestalsperrenverwaltung Sachsen).

→ List of ponds in the Revierwasserlaufanstalt Freiberg

== Neighbouring reservoirs ==
There are other reservoirs in the neighbourhood, most of which are also very old:

- Oberer und Unterer Pochwerkteich Langenau (Brand-Erbisdorf) (1570)
- Landteich
- Lotterteich (also Lother Teich, Lothener Teich or Mühlteich) (around 1600)
- Großer Teich (Freiberg), also called the Soldatenteich, (used for bathing)
- Mittelteich
- Erzwäsche, Freiberg
- Zechenteich, Großschirma (around 1600)

== Sources ==
- Herbert Pforr (November 2007), Ring Deutscher Bergingenieure (ed.), "Das erzgebirgische Kunstgrabensystem und die Wasserkraftmaschinen für Wasserhaltung und Schachtförderung im historischen Freiberger Silberbergbau" (PDF), Bergbau (in German), no. 11, Gelsenkirchen: Makossa, pp. 502–505, archived from the original (PDF) on 2012-03-24
