= Upper Harz Water Tunnels =

Mining tunnels in central Germany

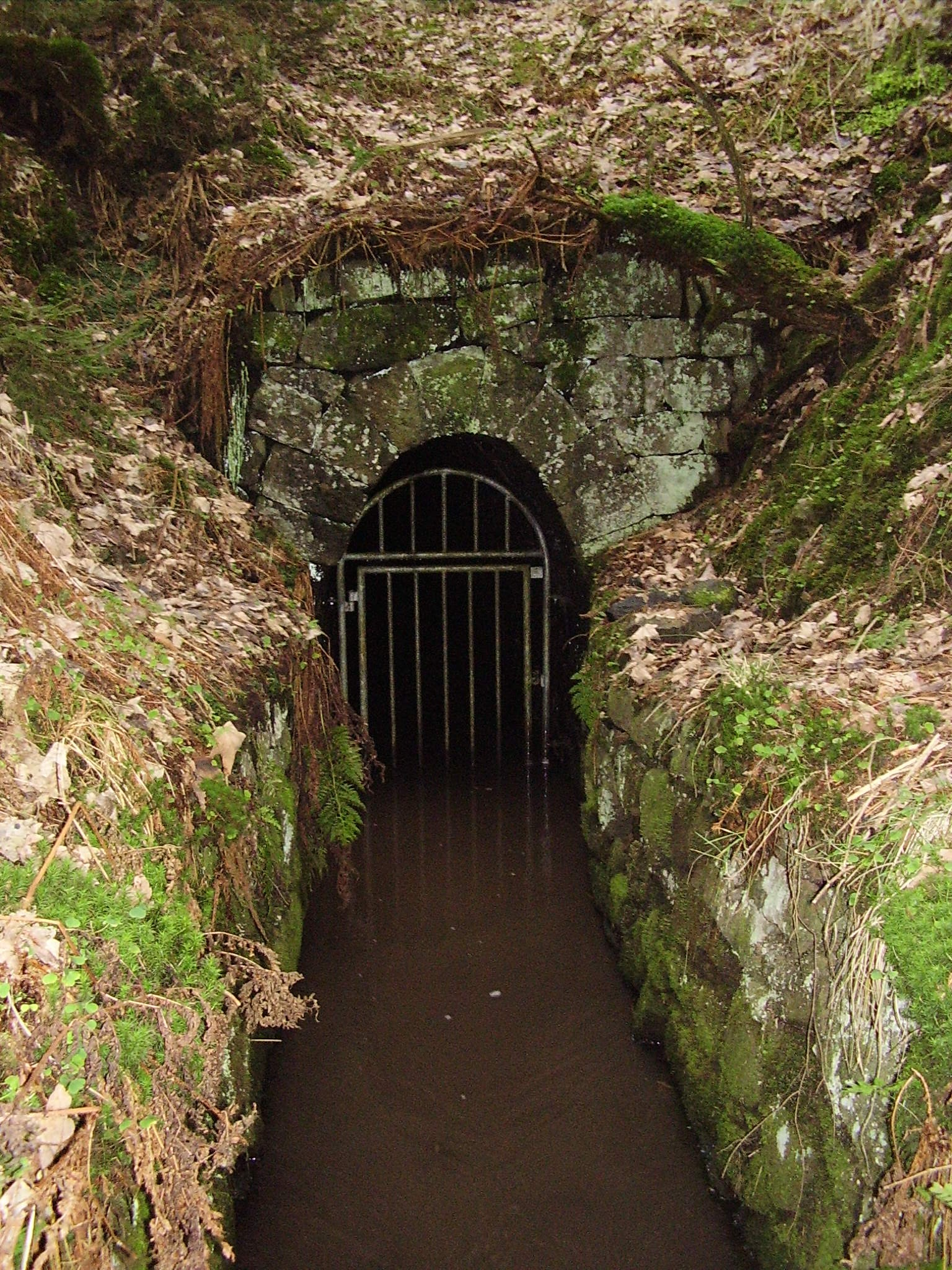
Exit portal of the Lower Hasenbach Tunnel

The Upper Harz Water Tunnels (German: Oberharzer Wasserläufe, pronounced [ˌoːbɐhaːɐ̯tsɐ ˈvasɐlɔʏfə]) are part of the Upper Harz Water Regale - a network of reservoirs, ditches, tunnels and other structures in the Harz mountains of central Germany. The German term Wasserlauf refers to the underground element (i.e. the tunnels) of the network of watercourses used in the historic silver mining industry of the Upper Harz. This network of ditches and tunnels was used to supply the mines with headrace waters for their water wheels from the 16th century onwards. In the system of the Upper Harz Water Regale there are over 35 such tunnels with a total length of about 30 km (19 mi).

== Construction ==
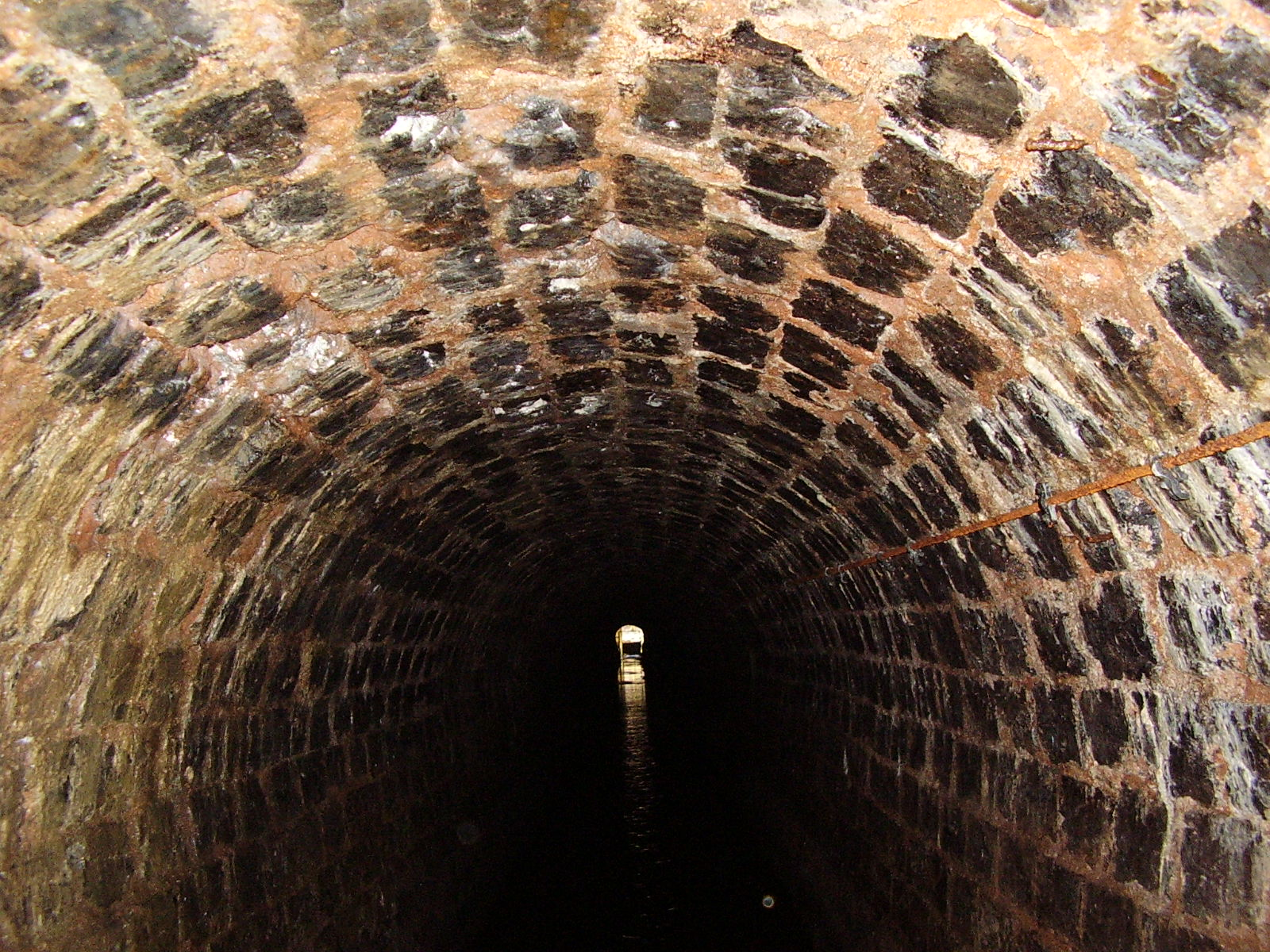
Slag brick walls in the Franz August Tunnel

Although explosives were already in use in the 17th century in the mines of the Upper Harz, tunnels continued to be hewn out by hand, that is with hammer and chisel for much longer. The reason was that there were difficulties in determining the right amount of gunpowder and fears that tunnels running just under the surface would collapse or that the explosive would produce fissures in the rock causing water to leak away. Almost all water tunnels were driven by counter-heading. Until the 18th century the miners excavated tunnels by following the weakest rock; this sometimes created a zigzag route that deviated significantly from the direct line. Not until the 19th century were tunnels driven in a strictly direct line using explosives.

The incline necessary to create a flow of water often amounted to less than 1% (in other words less than 1 metre (3 ft 3 in) drop for every 1,000 metres (3,300 ft) of length). The profile of the older tunnels, that had been driven with hammer and chisel, was sometimes as small as 1.20 m (3 ft 11 in) high and 0.80 m (2 ft 7 in) wide. The newer tunnels, however, were generally 2 m (6 ft 7 in) high and 1 m (3 ft 3 in) wide.

Compared with ditches, tunnels had the important advantage that the water flowing through them underground could not freeze up. The tunnels were laid primarily to short cut the long ditch runs around mountains. Such cuts also produced a steeper incline (shorter distances descending the same height difference have a steeper slope). This raised the flow velocity and hence the hydraulic capacity of the watercourse. The disadvantage of tunnels was the high investment cost of building them.

== List of working Upper Harz water tunnels ==
The working tunnels shown in this table follow the order in the latest listing by Preussag, which is based on their use in the various power stations.

English name	German Name	Built	Length	Route
Kellwasser Tunnel I	Kellwasser Wasserlauf I	1821	170 m	Dyke Ditch (Blochschleife) to the Nabe valley
Kellwasser Tunnel II	Kellwasser Wasserlauf II	1821	229 m	Blochschleife to Wiege on the Dyke Ditch
Rothenberg Tunnel	Rothenberger Wasserlauf	1868	775 m	Dyke Ditch: crosses the Rothenberg
Coventhai Tunnel	Coventhaier Wasserlauf	1852	540 m	Dyke Ditch: crosses the Coventhai
Dietrichsberg Tunnel	Dietrichsberger Wasserlauf	1863	1,044 m	Dyke Ditch from Fortune Pond to the "Fenster"
Bielenwiese Tunnel	Bielenwieser Wasserlauf	1864	357 m	Dyke Ditch from "Fenster" to "Teilung" (Mönchstal)
Mönchstal Tunnel	Mönchstaler Wasserlauf	1677	474 m	Dyke Ditch from Mönchstal into the Upper Hausherzberg Pond
Franz August Tunnel	Franz Auguster Wasserlauf	1832	632 m	Dyke Ditch from the Teilung into the Lower Peacock Pond
Jägersbleek Tunnel	Jägersbleeker Wasserlauf	1771	132 m	Träncke Ditch to the Jägersbleek Pond
Huttal Tunnel	Huttaler Wasserlauf	1763	783 m	Hirschler Pond to the Huttaler Widerwaage
Fortune Tunnel	Fortuner Wasserlauf	1785	777 m	Jägersbleek Ditch into the Middle Peacock Pond
Prince Wallis Tunnel	Prinz-Walliser Wasserlauf	about 1740	563 m	Nassenwiese Ditch into the Johann Friedrich Tunnel
Johann Friedrich Tunnel	Johann-Friedricher Wasserlauf	1673	805 m	From the Johann Friedrich Pond to the Dorothea Water Wheel Ditch
Kellerhals Tunnel	Kellerhalser Wasserlauf	1842	501 m	From the Middle Kellerhals Pond to the New Kellerhals Ditch, later used in the course of the Zellerfeld Ditch
Winterwiese Tunnel	Winterwieser Wasserlauf	before 1690	488 m	From the Zellerfeld Ditch into the Jungfrau Ditch / Middle Zechen Pond
Bremerhöhe Tunnel	Bremerhöher Wasserlauf	1704	732 m	Bremerhöhe Ditch to the Rosenhof Mining Area
Bärenbruch Tunnel	Bärenbrucher Wasserlauf	1949	940 m	From the Bärenbruch Pond into the "Upper Rosenhof Chute"
Upper Schwarzenbach Tunnel	Oberer Schwarzenbacher Wasserlauf	1808	760 m	"Upper Rosenhof Chute" to the Hasenbacher Widerwaage
Upper Hasenbach Tunnel	Oberer Hasenbacher Wasserlauf	1811	638 m	"Upper Rosenhof Chute" to Hasenbacher Widerwaage
Upper Flambach Tunnel	Oberer Flambacher Wasserlauf	1763	780 m	"Upper Rosenhof Chute" from Flambach to the Johannis valley
Upper Johannistal Tunnel	Oberer Johannistaler Wasserlauf	1839	1,014 m	"Upper Rosenhof Chute" Johannistal to the Klein Clausthal
Upper Klein Clausthal Tunnel	Oberer Klein-Clausthaler Wasserlauf	1776	492 m	"Upper Rosenhof Chute" from Klein Clausthal to the Rosenhof Mines
Ziegenberg Tunnel	Ziegenberger Wasserlauf	1847	413 m	"Lower Rosenhof Chute" from Ziegenberg Pond to the Schwarzenbach
Lower Schwarzenbach Tunnel	Unterer Schwarzenbacher Wasserlauf	1870	524 m	"Lower Rosenhof Chute" from the Schwarzenbach to the Hasenbach
Lower Hasenbach Tunnel	Unterer Hasenbacher Wasserlauf	1845	959 m	"Lower Rosenhof Chute" from the Hasenbach to the Flambach
Lower Flambach Tunnel	Unterer Flambacher Wasserlauf	1844	973 m	"Lower Rosenhof Chute" from the Flambach to the Johannistal
Lower Johannistal Tunnel I	Unterer Johannistaler Wasserlauf I	1835	558 m	"Lower Rosenhof Chute" from the Johannistal to the Klein Clausthal
Lower Johannistal Tunnel II	Unterer Johannistaler Wasserlauf II	1835	234 m	"Lower Rosenhof Chute"(continuation of Johannistal Tunnel I)
Lower Klein Clausthal Tunnel	Unterer Klein-Clausthaler Wasserlauf	1792	791 m	"Lower Rosenhof Chute" from the Kl. Clausthal to the Rosenhof Mines
Dorothea Rösche	Dorotheer Rösche	before 1771	325 m	Drainage for the water wheel (Radstube Kehrrad) at Dorothea Pit
Gesehe Tunnel	Geseher Wasserlauf	1698	722 m	Rehberg Ditch to the Gesehr / St. Andreasberg
Schulte Adit	Schulte Stollen	1838	1,220 m	From the Innerste river to the Wiemannsbucht (Bad Grund)
Upper Eichelberg Tunnel	Oberer Eichelberger Wasserlauf	1889	1,110 m	From Wiemannsbucht to Schönhofsblick
Lower Eichelberg Tunnel	Unterer Eichelberger Wasserlauf	1855	230 m	Drain from the Knesebeck Shaft

== List of disused Upper Harz water tunnels ==
"Disused" refers to all those tunnels that are no longer in service. Some of these are completely preserved; others, however, have largely fallen into ruin. The following list makes no claim to being complete.

English name	German Name	Built	Length	Route
Old Dietrichsberg Tunnel	Alter Dietrichsberger Wasserlauf	1662	260 m	Dyke Ditch: Bypasses the Dietrichsberg; became superfluous on the construction of the New Dietrichsberg Tunnel in 1863.
Old Upper Klein Clausthal Tunnel	Alter Oberer Klein-Clausthaler Wasserlauf		120 m	Upper Rosenhof Chute: Bypasses the Hüttenkopf
Old Lower Klein Clausthal Tunnel	Alter Unterer Klein-Clausthaler Wasserlauf		200 m	Lower Rosenhof Chute: Bypasses the Hüttenkopf
Benedict Tunnel	Benedikter Wasserlauf		100 m	Upper Kehrzug Ditch into the Hirschler Pond
Kalte Küche Tunnel	Kalte Küche Wasserlauf	1821	410 m	Dyke Ditch: crosses the Rothenberg; tunnel closed on the construction of the Rothenberg Tunnel in 1868.
Crane Tunnel	Kranicher Wasserlauf	1878	600 m	from the bottom outlet of the Crane Pond (Hahnenklee) to the Lower Raft Pond (Bockswiese)
Langer Tunnel	Langer Wasserlauf	before 1815	150 m	Short channel from the Oker region to the Langer Pond
Nassenwiese Tunnel	Nassenwieser Wasserlauf		250 m	from the Nassenwiese Ditch to the Johann Friedrich Tunnel
Piss Valley Tunnel	Pisstaler Wasserlauf	1732	1,100 m	Stadtweg Ditch (from the Stadtweg Pond) to Bockswiese
Polsterberg Tunnel	Polsterberger Wasserlauf	1767	1,23 km	Originally a gallery in the Eisenstein mine; between 1767 and 1813 tunnel from the Polsterberg Pumpworks (Polsterberger Hubhaus) to the Huttal Pond
Schwarzenberg Tunnel	Schwarzenberger Wasserlauf	1813	730 m	Links the outlet area of the Söse with the Oker river
Tannhai Tunnel	Tannhaier Wasserlauf	1875	430 m	Links the Kellerhals Pond, Kellerhals Tunnel to Bockswiese, Wäsche Ditch

== See also ==
- Upper Harz
- Upper Harz Water Regale
- Upper Harz Ponds
- Upper Harz Ditches
- Mining in the Upper Harz
- Rösche - generic German mining term for water tunnels

== Sources ==
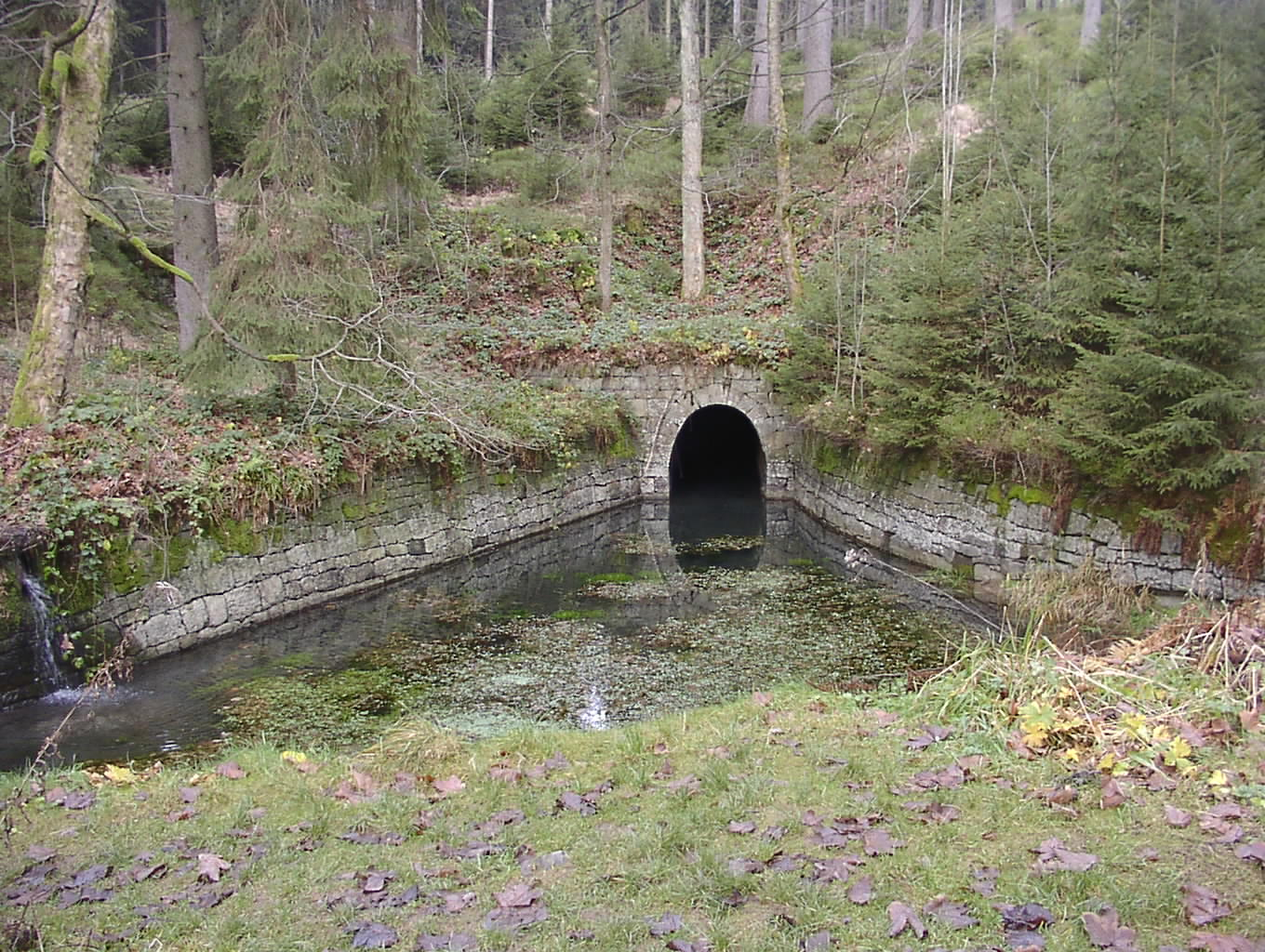
The Huttaler Widerwaage and the portal of the Huttal Tunnel

- Knissel, Walter; Fleisch, Gerhard (2004), Kulturdenkmal "Oberharzer Wasserregal" – eine epochale Leistung (in German), Clausthal-Zellerfeld: Papierflieger, ISBN 3-89720-725-7
- Schmidt, Martin (2002), Die Wasserwirtschaft des Oberharzer Bergbaus, Schriftenreihe der Frontinus-Gesellschaft (in German) (3rd ed.), Hildesheim: Harzwasserwerke, ISBN 3-00-009609-4
- Schmidt, Martin (2005), Das Kulturdenkmal Oberharzer Wasserregal (PDF) (in German), Clausthal-Zellerfeld: Harzwasserwerke, archived from the original (PDF) on 2009-04-19
