= Grundgraben =

Grundgraben may refer to:

- Grundgraben (Lohmgraben), a river in Bavaria, Germany, headstream of the Lohmgraben
- see Upper Harz Ditches: German for bottom ditch, used in the river names Zankwieser Grundgraben and Stadtweger Grundgraben
