= Gullet (disambiguation) =

Gullet, or esophagus, is an organ in vertebrates through which food passes.

Gullet may also refer to:

- Gulet, a Turkish sailboat
- Ruud Gullit (born 1962), Dutch football player and manager
- The valley between the teeth of a saw (Saw#Terminology)
- Gullet, opening hole or orifice of a mining gullet, see also the German mining term Rösche
- The Gullet, a narrow channel in Antarctica
