= Upper Harz Ditches =

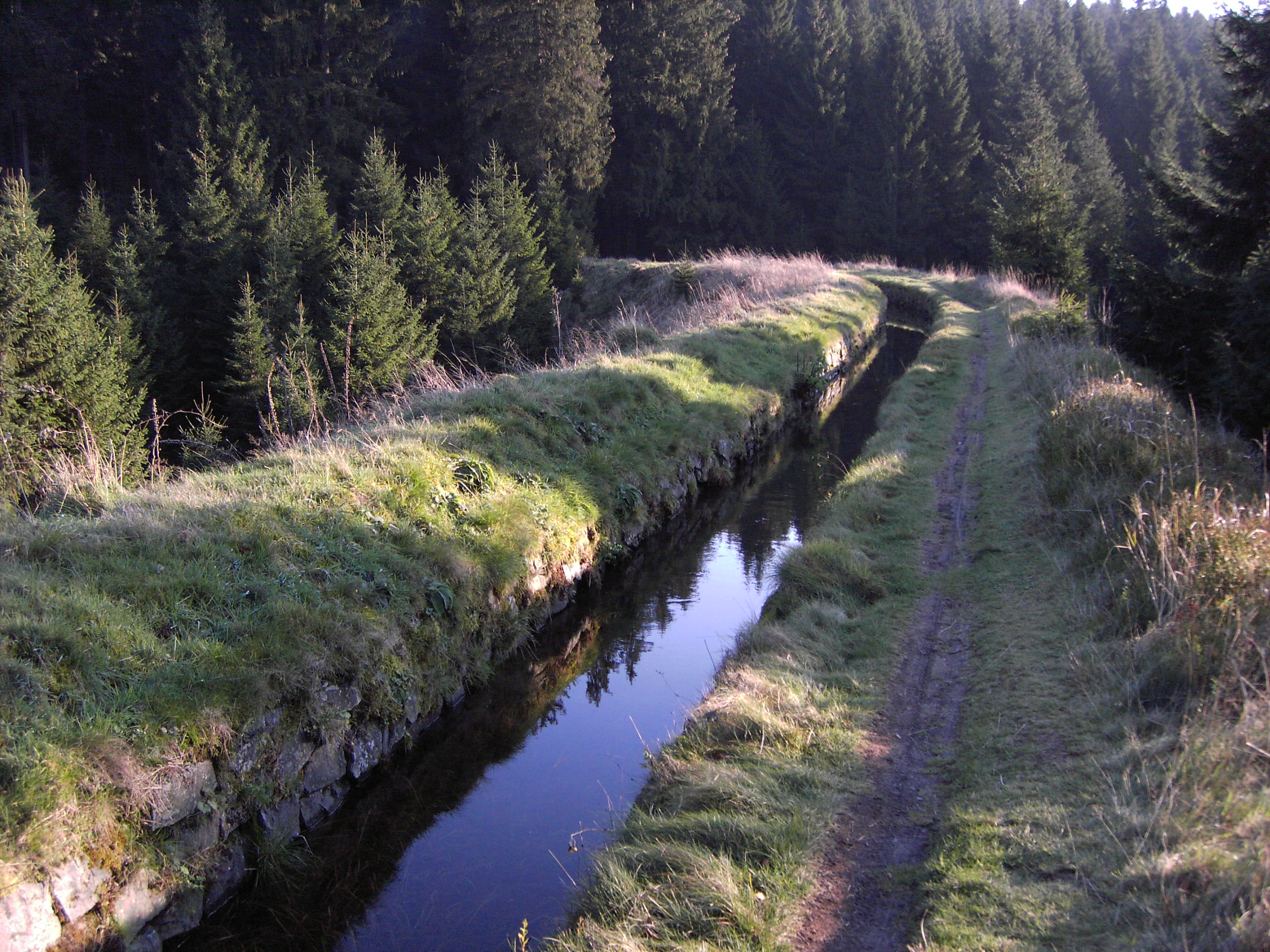
Hutthal Ditch

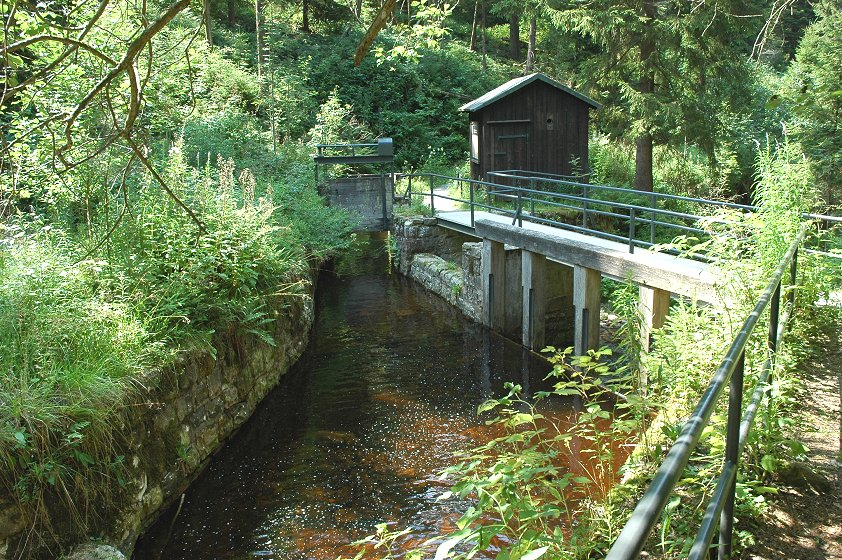
Control weir on the Dyke Ditch where it discharges into the Große Oker

The Upper Harz Ditches (German: Oberharzer Gräben, pronounced [ˌoːbɐhaːɐ̯tsɐ ˈɡʁɛːbm̩]) are hillside ditches, running roughly parallel to the contour lines, that were laid out in the Upper Harz in Germany from the 16th to the 19th centuries to supply water power to the silver mines there. They are an important component of the Upper Harz Water Regale, a historical water system that is now a cultural monument.

== Design ==
The ditches consist of a trench and an embankment (Grabenbrust) next to it, made of spoil piled up when the ditch was excavated. The embankments are frequently protected from erosion by a dry stone wall. In most cases, they also act as inspection paths for the ditch keepers (Grabenwärter) and, today, as public footpaths. The ditches are only inclined at about 1–2 ‰ (i.e. about 1 to 2 millimetres per metre). As a result, they run almost parallel to the contour lines of the terrain.

As protection against seepage the embankment and bed of the ditch are usually sealed with grass sods or clay. At inlets, where the ditch crosses forest streams, there are so-called Fehlschläge, small weirs, by which the water flow in the ditch can be regulated. When water levels are high these have to be opened, i.e. the boards controlling the flow must be removed.

The hydraulic capacity of most ditches is between 100 and 200 litres per second; on the Rehberg Ditch it is up to 600 L/s and on the Dyke Ditch up to 1000 L/s.

== List of the Upper Harz ditches ==
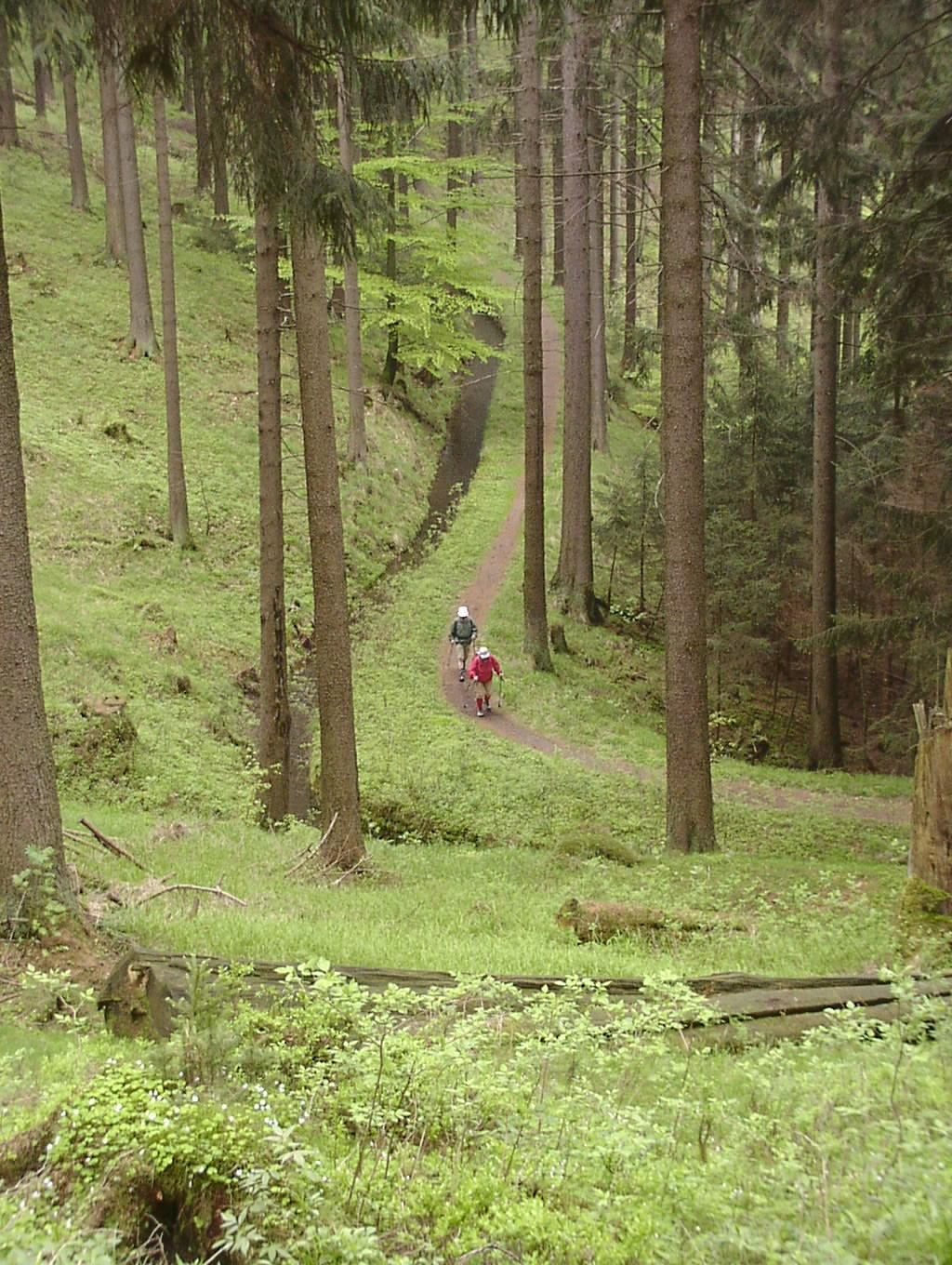
Walkers by the Morgenbrodstal Ditch near Dammhaus

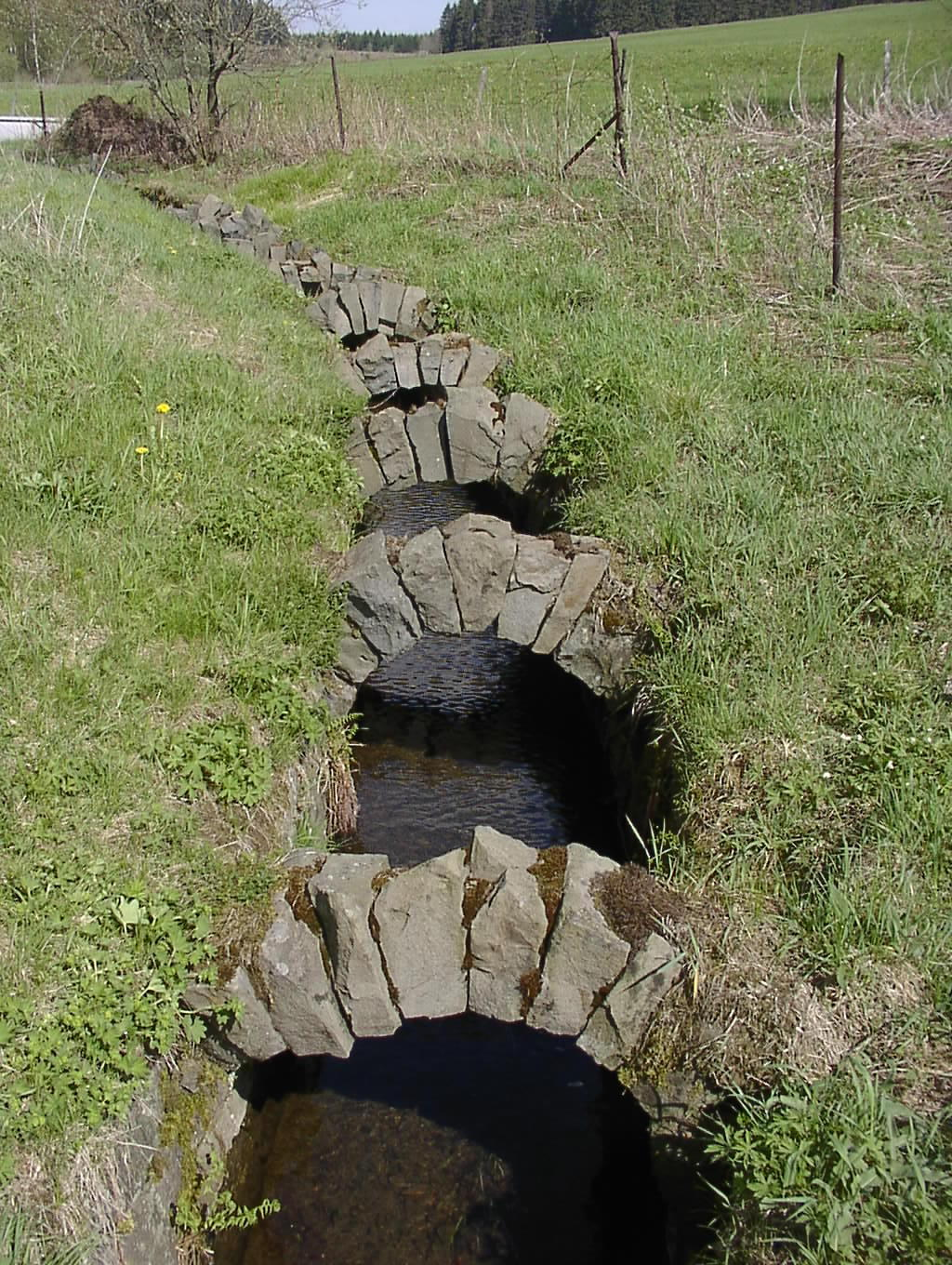
Zellerfeld Ditch with arches

The ditches are listed in an order which is based on the system by Preussag, who named the ditches in an order based on the power stations that could be supplied by them. At present only those working ditches still operated by the Harzwasserwerke are shown.

English name	German Name	Built	Length	Route
Abbe Ditch	Abbegraben	1827	1667 m	Drain from the Abbe east of Torfhaus to the Dyke Ditch
Flörichshai Ditch	Flörichshaier Graben	1827	1311 m	Part of the Oder west of Torfhaus to the Dyke Ditch
Clausthal Flood Ditch	Clausthaler Flutgraben	1827	4116 m	Drain from the source area of the Sieber and the Sonnenkappe to the Dyke Ditch
Dyke Ditch	Dammgraben	1732–1827	15.409 m	From the Brocken-Bruchberg area to the Upper Hausherzberg Pond
Morgenbrodstal Ditch	Morgenbrodstaler Graben		4111 m	Drain from the upper course of the Söse to the Dyke Ditch
Huttal Ditch	Huttaler Graben	1763	1168 m	Link from Huttal Pond (†) to the Huttaler Widerwaage
Jägersbleek Ditch	Jägersbleeker Graben		726 m	From Jägersbleek Pond to the Fortune watercourse
Dorothea Water Wheel Ditch	Dorotheer Kehrradsgraben		903 m	Stag Pond to the reciprocal water wheel (diameter 8.6 m) at the Dorothea Pit
Field Ditch	Feldgraben		2112 m	From the southern part of the town of Clausthal to the Middle Pfauenteich
Kellerhals Ditch	Kellerhalser Graben		508 m	Bypass for the Upper Kellerhals Pond
Upper Schalke Ditch	Oberer Schalker Graben		2721 m	From the southern part of the Schalke to Hahnenklee, original length almost 9 km
Lower Schalke Ditch	Unterer Schalker Graben		2721 m	From the southern part of the Schalke into Kiefholz Pond
Zankwiese Bottom Ditch (also Kahleberg Fault Ditch)	Zankwieser Grundgraben (also Kahleberger Bruchgraben)		329 m	From Widerwaage Zankwiese Pond into Kiefholz Pond
Zellerfeld Ditch	Zellerfelder Kunstgraben		4839 m	Originally 6.19 km long from the Middle Kellerhals Pond to Zellerfeld
Ringer Ditch	Ringer Graben		383 m	From the bottom outlet of the Middle Zechen Pond to the Ringe Zechenhaus
Upper Einersberg Ditch	Oberer Einersberger Graben		1250 m	From the bottom outlet of the Middle Zechen Pond towards Einersberg
4th Stamp Mill Ditch	4. Pochgraben		991 m	In the Zellerfeld valley, parallel to the Zellbach
Eschenbach Flood Ditch	Eschenbacher Flutgraben		874 m	From the Zellweg (Zellerfeld) into Lower Eschenbach Pond
Upper Eschenbach Chute	Oberer Eschenbacher Fallgraben		350 m	From Lower Eschenb. Pond (upper drain) to the Schinderloch
Lower Eschenbach Chute	Unterer Eschenbacher Fallgraben		291 m	From the Lower Eschenb. Pond (lower drain) to the Zellbach
Bremerhöhe Ditch	Bremerhöher Graben		1287 m	From the Schinderloch (Zellbach) to the Rosenhof mines
Schmidt's Ditch	Schmidtsgraben		453 m	Diversion of the Flambach around the two Flambach Ponds
Taubefrau Ditch	Taubefrauer Graben		574 m	Eastern inlet ditch for the Sumpfteich
Wäsche Ditch	Wäschegraben		420 m	From the bottom outlet of the Middle Grumbach Pond
Hedge Ditch	Heckegraben		326 m	Part of the Lower Rosenhof Ditches in the area of Pixhai Mill
Stadtweg Bottom Ditch	Stadtweger Grundgraben		193 m	From the bottom outlet of the Stadtweg Pond drain around the Mill Pond below
Jungfrau Ditch	Jungfrau Graben		300 m	From the Winterwiese tunnel into the Middle Zechen Pond
Elisabeth Ditch	Elisabether Graben		300 m	Diversion around the Lower Peacock Pond, formerly also intended to be part of the Dyke Ditch
Upper Rosenhof Chute	Oberer Rosenhöfer Fall		1299 m	Consists of four link ditches between the tunnels of the ORF
Lower Rosenhof Chute	Unterer Rosenhöfer Fall		637 m	four link ditches between the tunnels of the Lower Rosenhof Chute
Hühnerbrühe Ditch	Hühnerbrüher Graben	to 1725	775 m	Diversion of the Hühnerbrühe into the Oderteich (western Oderteich)
Königskopf Ditch	Königsköpfer Graben	to 1725	1467 m	Bypass for several streams of the Königskopf into the Oderteich (from the east)
Rehberg Ditch	Rehberger Graben	1699	7211 m	From the bottom outlet of the Oderteich to Sankt Andreasberg
Sonnenberg Ditch	Sonnenberger Graben	before 1600	3619 m	From parts of the Sonnenberg into the Rehberg Ditch

== See also ==
- Upper Harz
- Upper Harz Water Regale
- Upper Harz Ponds
- Upper Harz Water Tunnels
- Kunstgraben

== Sources ==
- Knissel, Walter; Fleisch, Gerhard (2005), Kulturdenkmal "Oberharzer Wasserregal" – eine epochale Leistung (in German) (2nd ed.), Clausthal-Zellerfeld: Papierflieger, ISBN 3-89720-725-7
- Schmidt, Martin (2002), Die Wasserwirtschaft des Oberharzer Bergbaus, Schriftenreihe der Frontinus-Gesellschaft (in German) (3rd ed.), Hildesheim: Harzwasserwerke, ISBN 3-00-009609-4
- Schmidt, Martin (2005), Das Kulturdenkmal Oberharzer Wasserregal (PDF) (in German), Clausthal-Zellerfeld: Harzwasserwerke, archived from the original (PDF) on 2009-04-19
- Schmidt, Martin (2007), WasserWanderWege (in German) (3rd ed.), Clausthal-Zellerfeld: Pieper, ISBN 3-923605-49-8
