= Kunstteich =

Historic German term

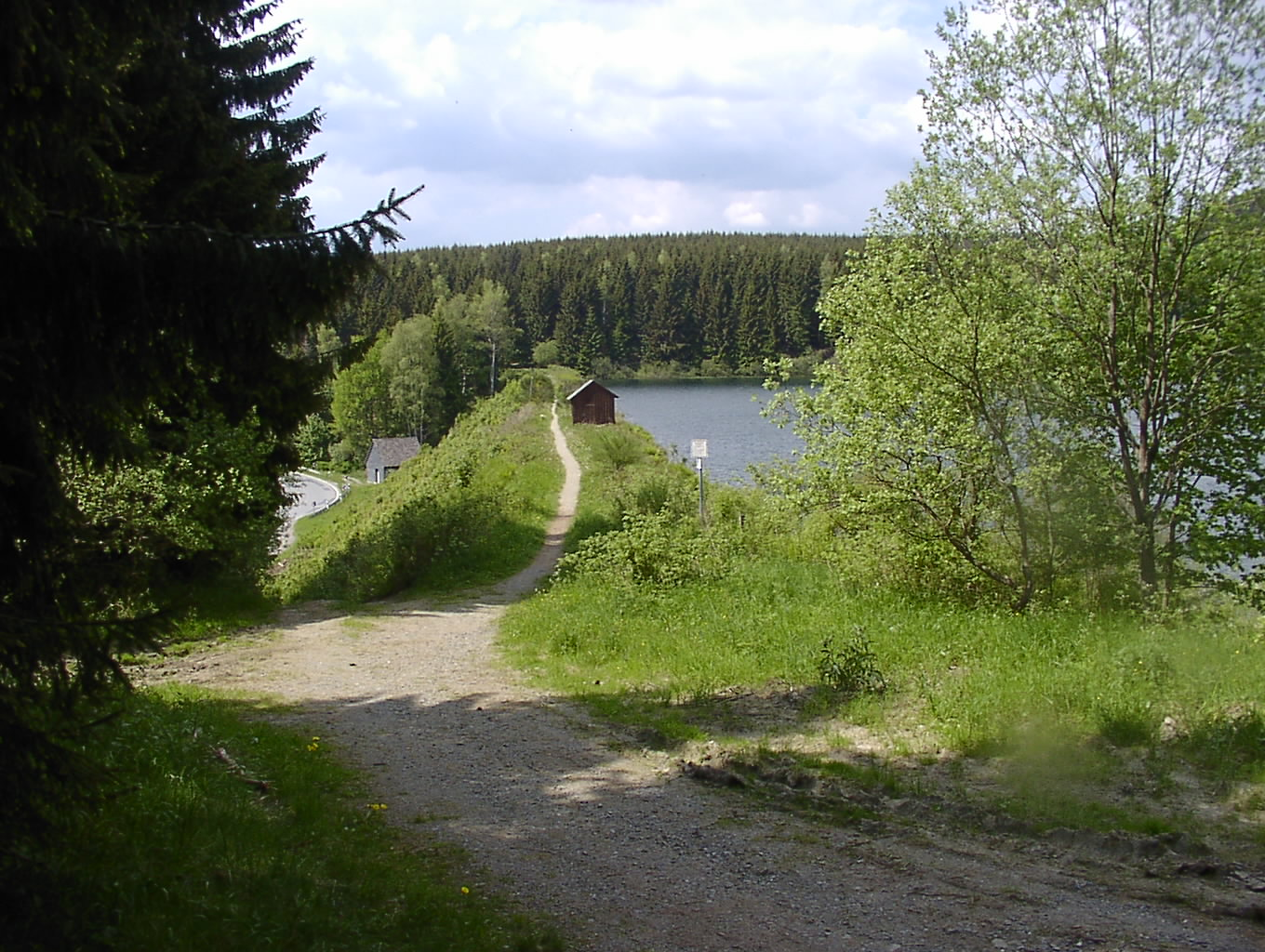
The dam of the Middle Kellerhals Pond, a Kunstteich in the Upper Harz Water Regale

A Kunstteich (plural: Kunstteiche) is an historic German term for a man-made lake or pond associated with the mining industry and its technology. These ponds were created by the construction of barriers, typically dams and embankments, and were used to supply hydropower and water to the mines. Water stored in the reservoir was used for a variety of purposes. It was used to turn water wheels that in turn drove the various mechanical devices used in mining in earlier centuries, such as man engines. It was also used to produce power and drain the mines, or in the processing of ore. In principle, all Kunstteiche are small dam and reservoir installations. The oldest working dams in Germany are Kunstteiche.

Water is supplied to and transported away from the ponds either above ground in artificial channels (Kunstgräben) or underground through so-called Röschen, small channels in the mine galleries. If the water from Kunstteiche is used in the smelting (Verhüttung) of ore they may be called Hüttenteiche or "smelter ponds".

An extensive, surviving system of Kunstteiche and Röschen is the Freiberg Mining Area Water System (Revierwasserlaufanstalt Freiberg) in the Ore Mountains in the former Freiberg mining region (10 ponds). Other very large systems are found in the Upper Harz around Clausthal-Zellerfeld (Upper Harz Water Regale, 65 ponds) and in the Lower Harz around Straßberg (Lower Harz Ditch and Pond System, 21 ponds with a capacity of 1.75 M m³).

== See also ==
- Mining in the Upper Harz
- Man engine
- Kunstgraben

== Literature ==
- Otfried Wagenbreth, Eberhard Wächtler: Der Freiberger Bergbau: Technische Denkmale und Geschichte. 2nd edn., Springer Spektrum Deutscher Verlag für Grundstoffindustrie, Berlin-Heidelberg, 1988, ISBN 978-3-662-44763-5.
- Wilfried Ließmann: Historischer Bergbau im Harz. 3rd edn., Springer Verlag, Berlin and Heidelberg, 2010, ISBN 978-3-540-31327-4.
