= Huttaler Widerwaage =

Reservoir in Germany

Coordinates: 51°47′08″N 10°22′40″E

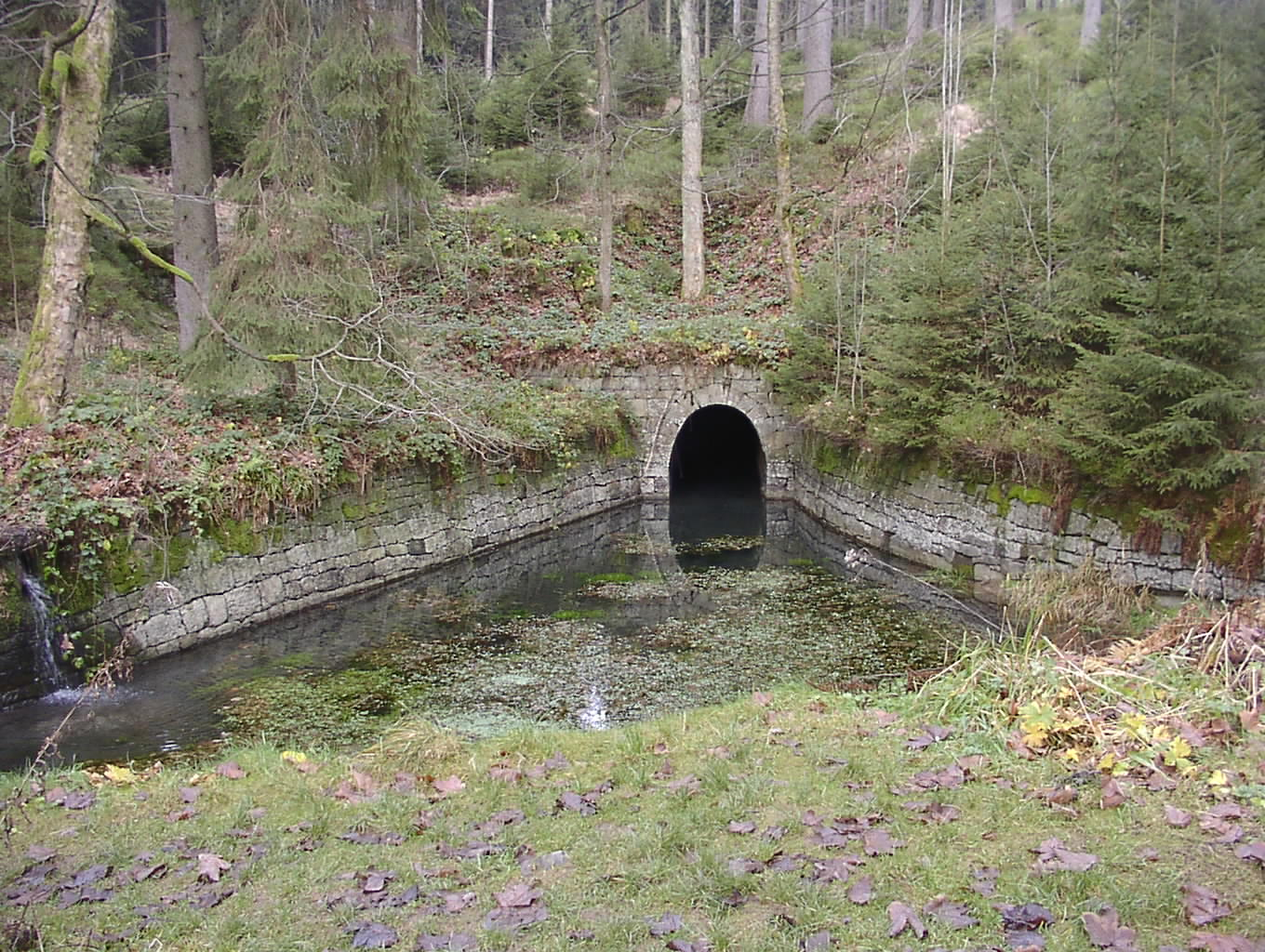
Huttaler Widerwaage and mouth of the Huttal Water Tunnel

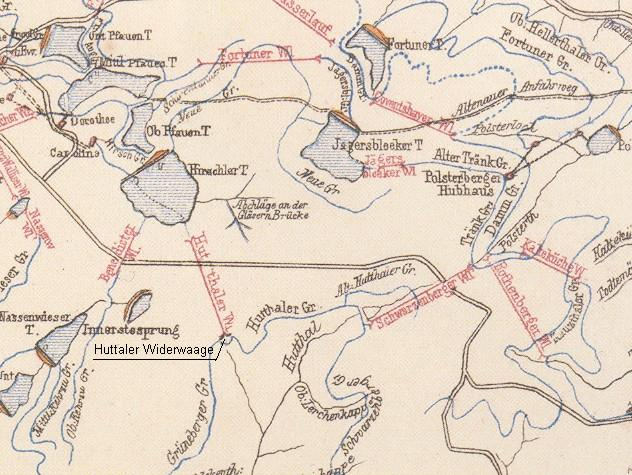
Plan of the Huttaler Widerwaage and the structures linked to it

The Huttaler Widerwaage is a small reservoir that is a part of the Upper Harz Water Regale, an old mining water management system in the Harz Mountains of Germany that is now a UNESCO World Heritage Site. The reservoir lies east of the mining town of Clausthal-Zellerfeld. It is designed to feed water from the Huttal river during times of low water to the reservoir pond of the Hirschler Teich and, during times of high water, to handle the overflow of water from it.

== Location ==
The Huttaler Widerwaage lies in the Upper Harz in the Harz Nature Park. It is located southeast of Clausthal-Zellerfeld around 550 metres east-southeast of the source of the Innerste and about 500 metres south of the B 242 at Huttaler Graben at about 605 m above sea level (NHN).

== Function ==
A Widerwaage is the name used in the region of the Upper Harz Water Regale for a small basin or small impoundment. This particular basin is impounded by a small wooden weir structure, a so-called Fehlschlag. It is linked by the Huttal Water Tunnel (Huttaler Wasserlauf) with the Hirschler Teich on the other side of the ridge and is designed so that the two reservoirs act as a communicating vessels. Water from the Schwarzenberg and the Polsterberg Pumphouse is supplied to the Widerwaage by the Huttal Ditch (Huttaler Graben). If the weir is full, water is drained out of it through the Huttal Water Tunnel to the Hirschler Teich. There it was used to supply hydropower for the very productive Caroline and Dorothea Pits.
