= Sperberhai Dyke =

Coordinates: 51°46′49″N 10°25′12″E

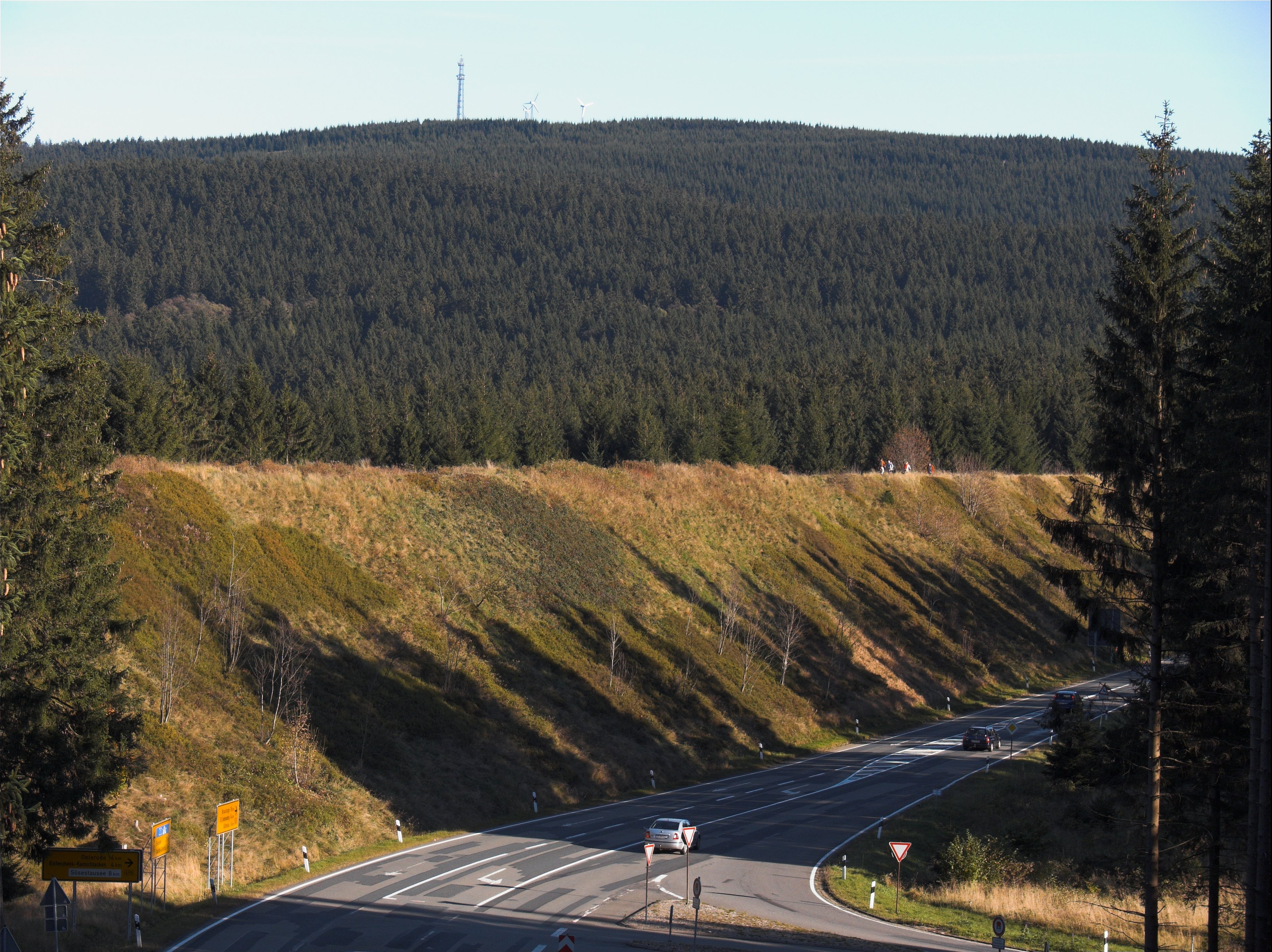
The centre section of the embankment; in the background the Acker ridge with wind generators and the Stieglitzecke transmission tower

The Sperberhai Dyke (German: Sperberhaier Damm) is in fact an aqueduct which forms part of the Upper Harz Water Regale network of reservoirs, ditches, dams and tunnels in the Harz mountains of central Germany. It carries the water of the Dyke Ditch over the depression of the Sperberhai to the Clausthal plateau.

The Sperberhai Dyke was built in 1732 - 34 in order to satisfy the rising demand for water power for the water wheels of the Clausthal mines. The water crossed the embankment in a channel along its crest. The channel is only visible today at its western end. Its hydraulic capacity at peak times was up to 1,000 litres per second.

== Sources ==
- Martin Schmidt (2002), "Die Wasserwirtschaft des Oberharzer Bergbaus", Schriftenreihe der Frontinus-Gesellschaft (in German), vol. Heft 13 (3 ed.), Harzwasserwerke, pp. 29–78
