= Upper Harz Water Regale =

Upper Harz Water Management System
UNESCO World Heritage Site
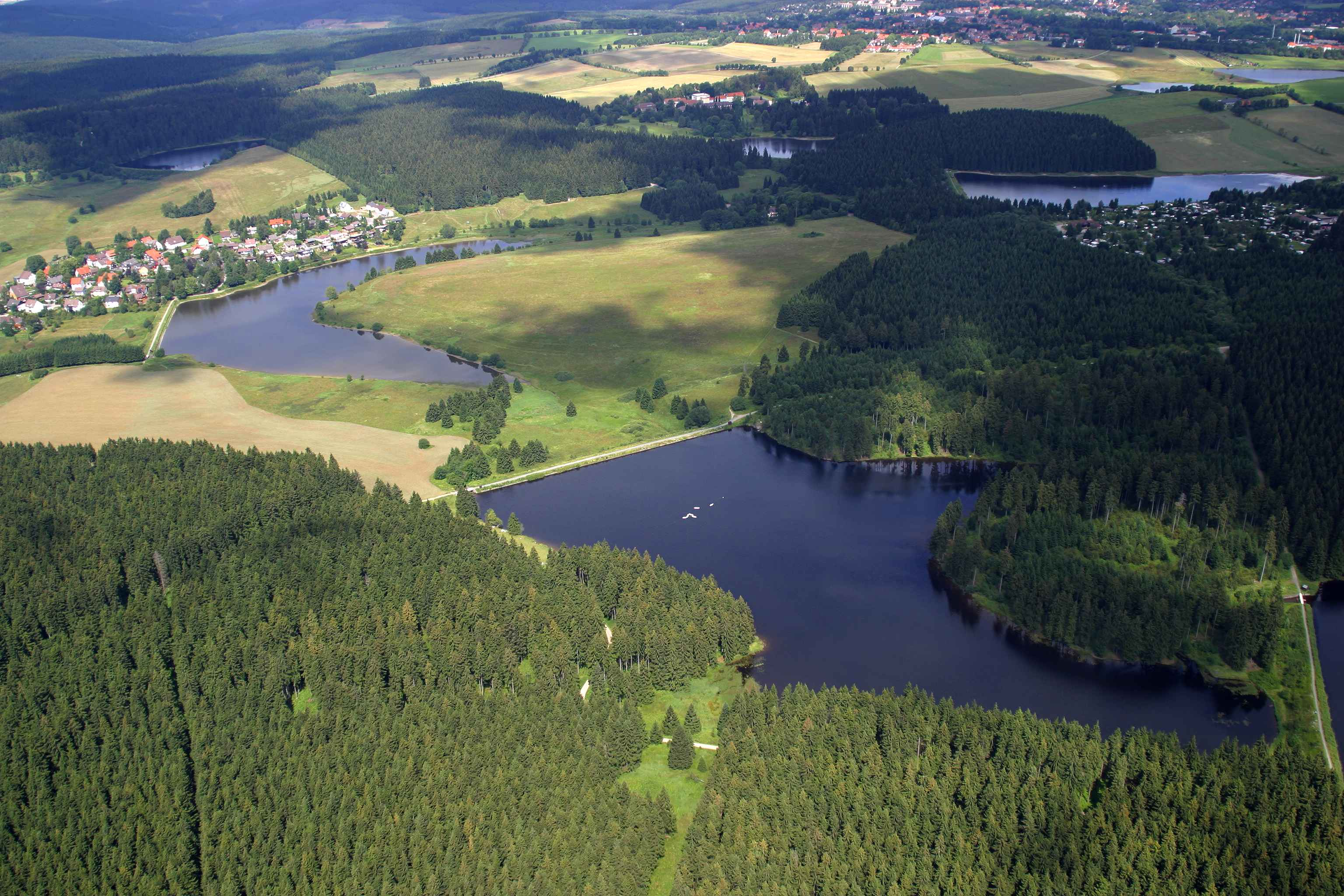

- Location within Germany Location within Lower Saxony
- Location: Upper Harz, Lower Saxony, Germany
- Part of: Mines of Rammelsberg, Historic Town of Goslar and Upper Harz Water Management System
- Includes: Upper Harz Ditches; Upper Harz Ponds; Upper Harz Water Tunnels
- Criteria: Cultural: (i)(ii)(iii)(iv)
- Reference: 623ter-002
- Inscription: 1992 (16th Session)
- Extensions: 2008, 2010
- Area: 1,009.89 ha (2,495.5 acres)
- Buffer zone: 5,654.69 ha (13,973.0 acres)
- Coordinates: 51°49′12″N 10°20′24″E

The Upper Harz Water Regale (German: Oberharzer Wasserregal, pronounced [ˌoːbɐhaːɐ̯tsɐ ˈvasɐʁeɡaːl]) is a system of dams, reservoirs, ditches and other structures, much of which was built from the 16th to 19th centuries to divert and store the water that drove the water wheels of the mines in the Upper Harz region of Germany. The term regale, here, refers to the granting of royal privileges or rights (droit de régale) in this case to permit the use of water for mining operations in the Harz mountains of Germany.

The Upper Harz Water Regale is one of the largest and most important historic mining water management systems in the world. The facilities developed for the generation of water power have been placed under protection since 1978 as cultural monuments. The majority are still used, albeit nowadays their purpose is primarily to support rural conservation (the preservation of a historic cultural landscape), nature conservation, tourism and swimming. From a water management perspective, several of the reservoirs still play a role in flood protection and the supply of drinking water. On 31 July 2010 the Regale was declared a UNESCO World Heritage Site affiliated with the Mines of Rammelsberg and the Historic Town of Goslar because of its importance in the development of mining techniques and testimony to the medieval history of ore mining.

The water system covers an area of roughly 200 square kilometres (77 sq mi) within the Lower Saxon part of the Harz, the majority of structures being found in the vicinity of Clausthal-Zellerfeld, Hahnenklee, Sankt Andreasberg, Buntenbock, Wildemann, Lautenthal, Schulenberg, Altenau and Torfhaus.

== The Water Regale ==
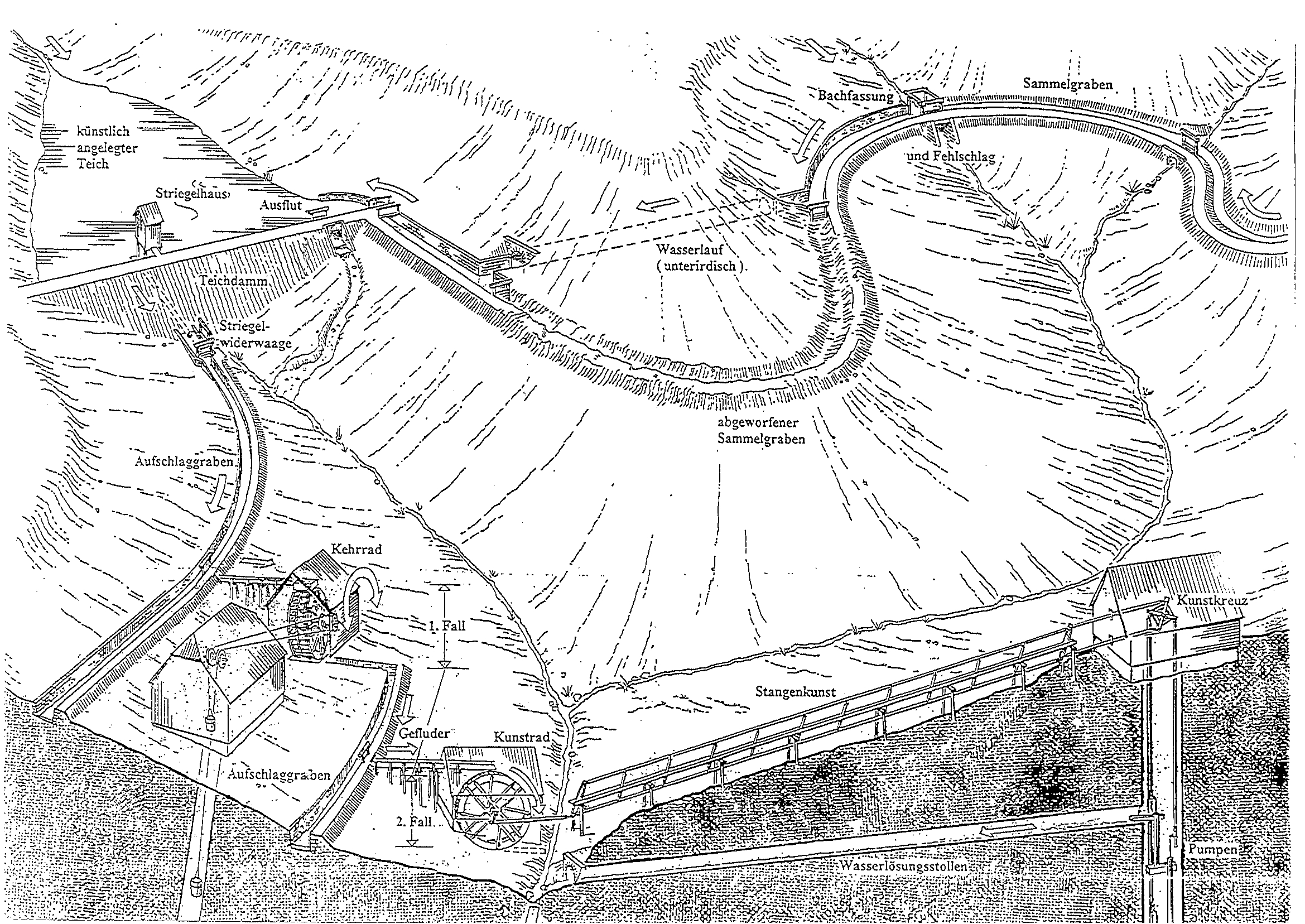
Schematic representation of the Upper Harz Water Regale showing the ponds, ditches and tunnels as well as the use of water power in the mines

Regale in this context means a royal prerogative. Through the so-called Bergregal, or "mining rights", the monarch granted the right to mine and, through the Wasserregal, he granted the right to use local water supplies for the purpose of mining. Other water users, particularly mill owners, had a lower priority. This 'water regale' or 'right to use water' was part of the overall Bergfreiheit or mining rights that were valid in Lower Saxony until the 1960s.

In German, the term Oberharzer Wasserwirtschaft ("Upper Harz Water Management") has also been frequently used to refer to these historic facilities. But this is not precise enough, because in the last hundred years an intensive, modern water management system has been put in place in the Upper Harz in the form of a number of new dams and their associated structures and ditches.

== The Upper Harz mining industry ==
The Upper Harz was once one of the most important mining regions in Germany. The major products of its mines were silver, copper, lead, iron and, from the 19th century, zinc as well. The main source of income, however, was silver. From the 16th to the middle of the 19th centuries about 40–50% of the entire German silver production originated in the Upper Harz. The taxes raised from this contributed significantly to the revenue of the royal houses in Hanover and Brunswick-Wolfenbüttel and helped to secure their positions of power and influence within the Holy Roman Empire.

Its lucrativeness justified a high commitment in terms of investment and effort. Hereby the Upper Harz mining industry produced a considerable number of innovations and inventions, including such important advances as the man engine, the water-column engine (Wassersäulenmaschine) and the wire cable.

== Mining and water ==
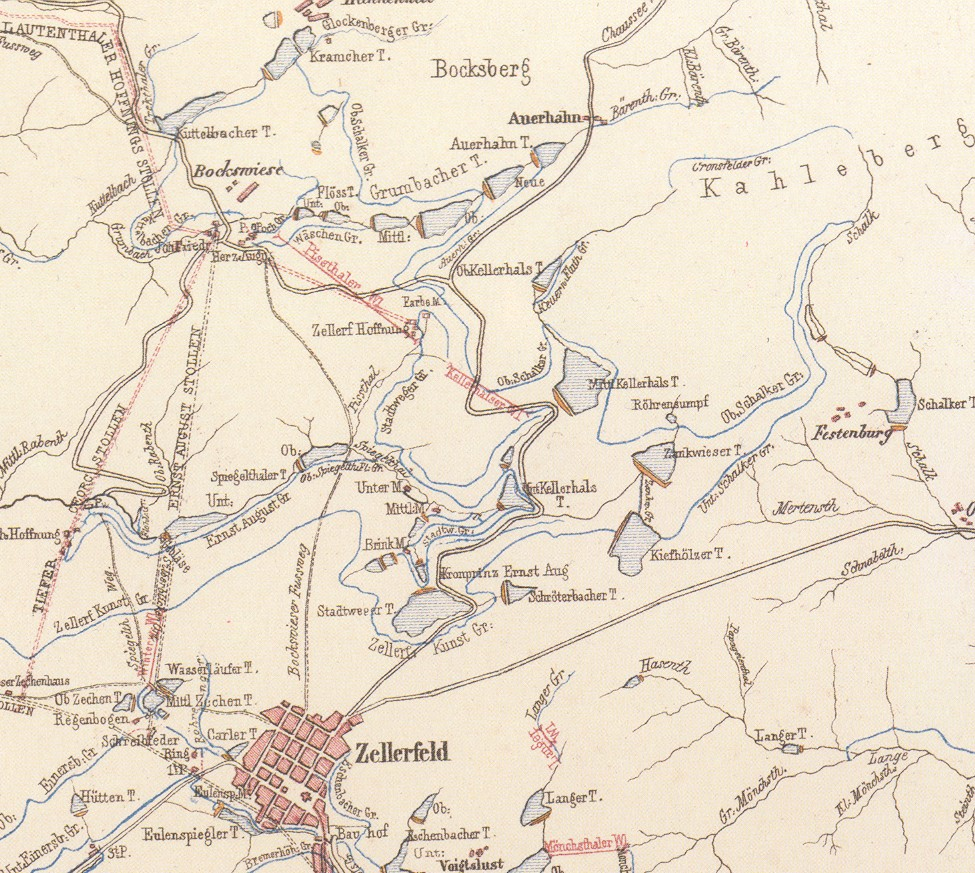
Sketch of ponds, ditches and tunnels between Zellerfeld and Bockswiese around 1868

Mining becomes a very energy-intensive activity as soon as excavation extends any significant distance underground. In the Upper Harz, vein mining (Gangerzbergbau) was the main form of extraction, with excavation following the near-vertical lodes straight down into the earth. Only a few metres down the ingress of water increased the difficulty of excavation considerably. Initially it was mopped up using men standing on ladders, the so-called Wasserknechten ("water servants"), with their leather buckets. Later, the introduction of horses and whims (Göpel) enabled larger quantities of water to be lifted. But horses were expensive and had to be changed every few hours. As a result, mines – particularly the richer, deeper ones – started to use hydropower systems, able to work continuously, 24 hours a day. To do this, streams were diverted onto water wheels that drove reciprocating pumps in order to raise water from greater depths and in greater quantities. The principle was to raise water with water.

To operate these water wheels, a continuous and substantial supply of water was needed. Although the Upper Harz, with an annual precipitation of over 1300 millimetres per year, received copious amounts of water, the mines often lay high up in the mountains close to the watersheds where there were only a few streams of any size. In addition the flow of mountain streams in the rocky terrain was very variable. It often only needed a few weeks of low rainfall for the water supply to the mines to be threatened. This led to several mines having to be closed.

In their heyday, the mines of the Upper Harz were among the deepest in the world. For example, as early as 1700, shaft depths of 300 metres were exceeded and, around 1830, a depth of 600 metres was attained; this was now so deep that the mine was actually below sea level – something which was considered significant at that time. Deep shafts, however, demanded correspondingly high levels of energy to lift ore and pit water. This high energy consumption, combined with the heavy demand for water, led to even more strenuous attempts to develop the available water power.

The miners usually built new water structures in those periods when no ore could be extracted due to the lack of water to power the wheels. When the water wheels stopped running, the underground water that ingressed the mine could no longer be removed; the mine drowned and the miners were driven out. During these phases work concentrated on upgrading the facilities of the Upper Harz Water Regale.

== Water diversion and storage elements ==
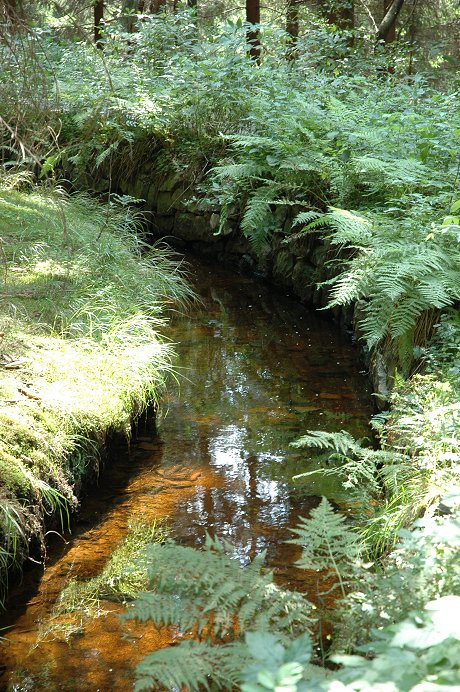
The Dam Ditch near Altenau

In all, 143 dammed ponds, 500 kilometres of ditch and 30 kilometres of tunnel were built for the collection, diversion and storage of the surface runoff water in the Upper Harz. In addition about 100 kilometres of drainage adits are included as part of the Regale. These facilities were not, however, all in operation at the same time. The Harzwasserwerke today operates and maintains 65 dammed ponds, 70 kilometres of ditch and 20 kilometres of tunnel. Several smaller dammed ponds still belong to the Lower Saxon State Forestry Department or are even in private hands.

The principle of water diversion is to collect the water in ditches, running almost parallel to the contours of the slope, and to divert it to the mining areas. These supply channels can easily be ten or more kilometres long (like the Dam Ditch or the Upper Schalke Ditch). Sometimes the water so collected was not fed directly to the water wheels, but into large, artificial, dammed ponds (Teiche) which acted as reservoirs, in order to ensure enough water was available for the wheels even in times of drought. From the bottom outlets of these ponds the water could be led into a ditch system in order to power the water wheels. Usually several wheels were arranged one after another, like a cascade, so that the water could be used to drive more than one wheel. In order to lead the water over as many wheels as possible, it had to be collected, stored and routed around at the highest possible elevation.

The technology of the time did not enable dams to be built with heights of more than about 15 metres. This meant that many small ponds had to be laid out rather than a few larger ones. By arranging the ponds in a cascade, water could be retained at a high elevation in order to drive as many water wheels as possible. A number of these pond cascades were built, comprising four to six ponds.

The majority of water wheels were used to drive pumps. Occasionally, the power they generated had to be transmitted over several hundred metres to the mine itself using flat rods (Feldgestänge). Important mines also had a reciprocal water wheel which was used to provide power for transporting the ore and the material to be crushed. All water wheels were of the overshot type. Apart from a few reconstructions, the water wheels all disappeared during the last century.

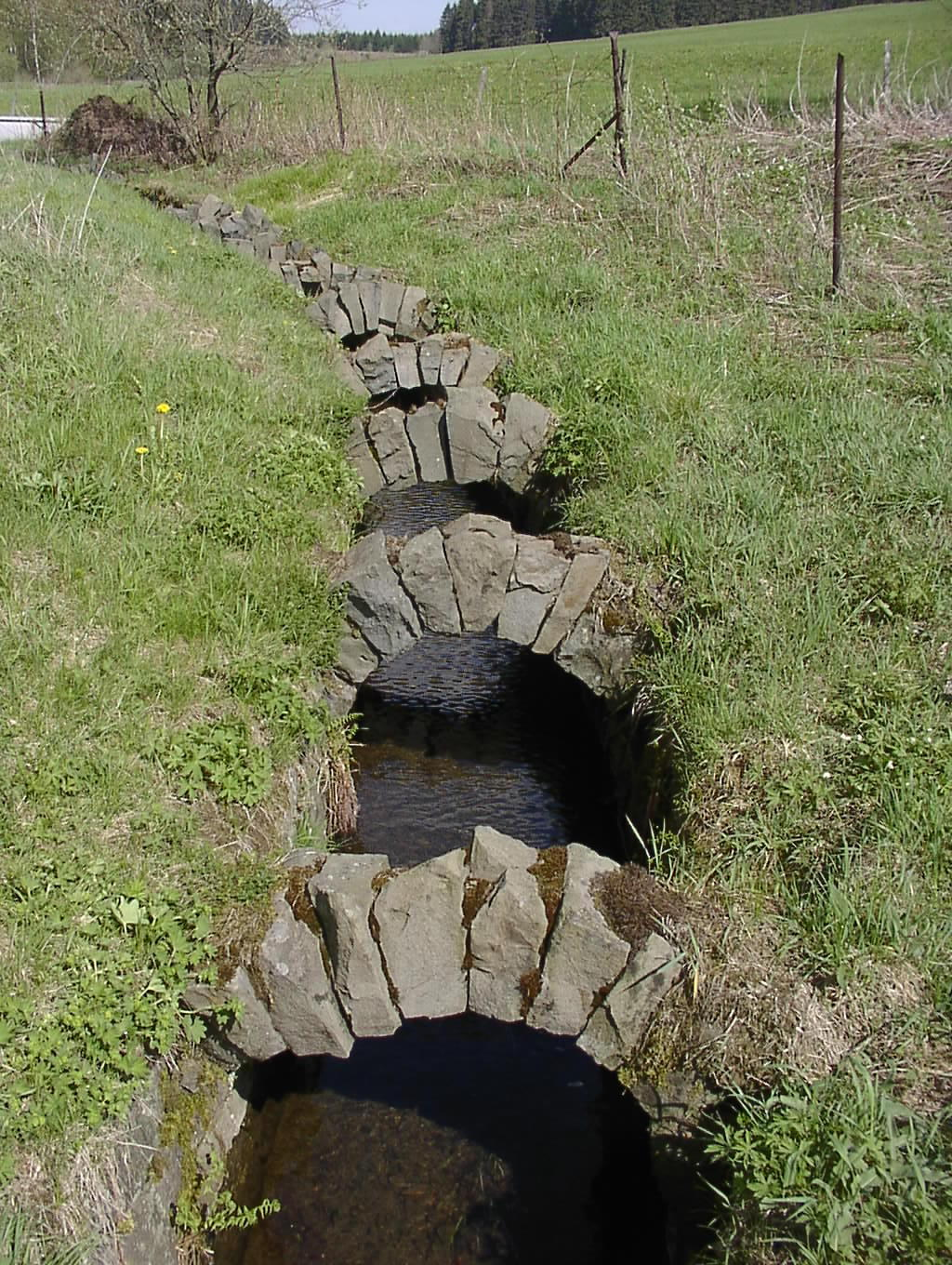
Arches on the Zellerfeld Ditch

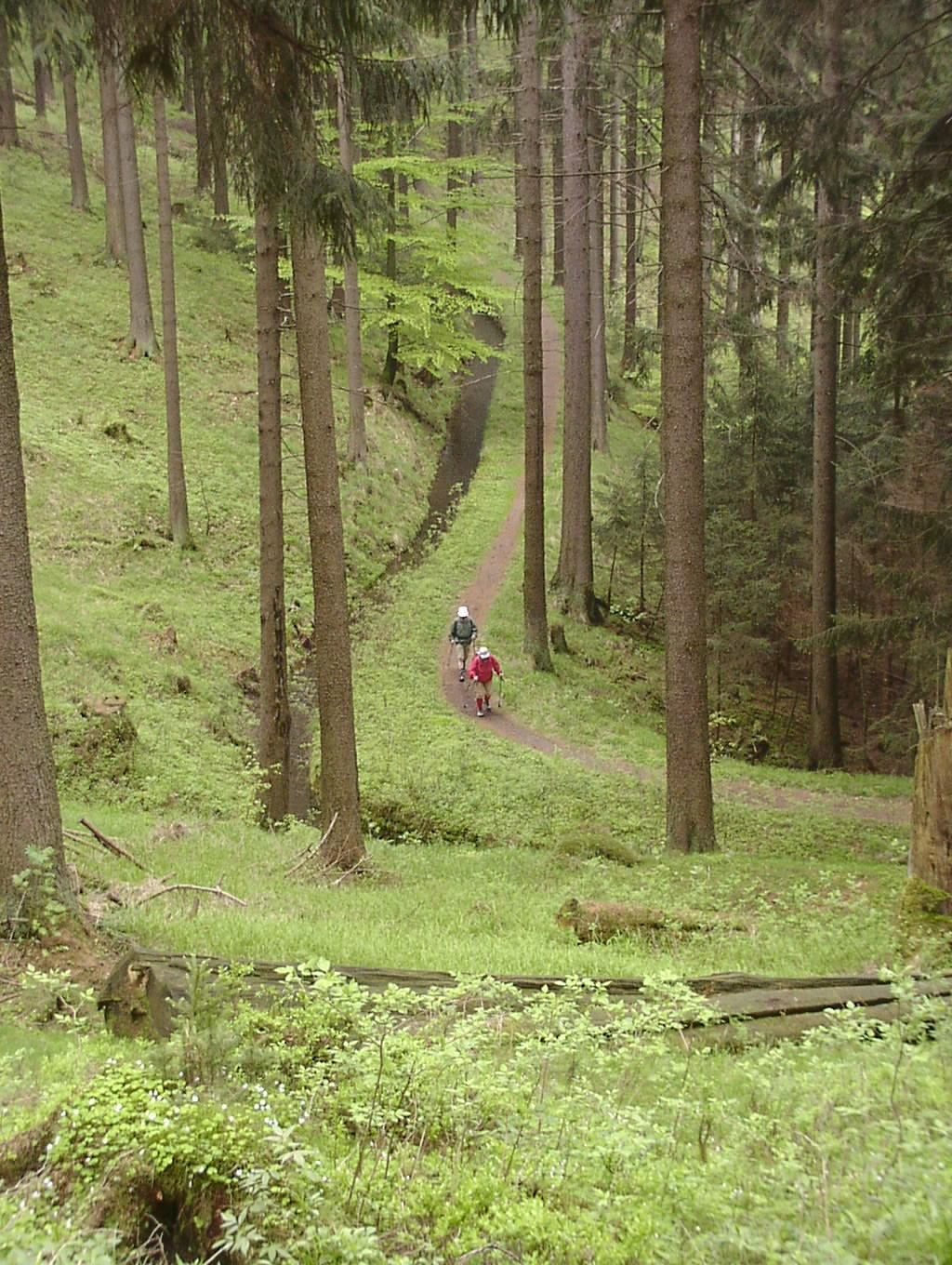
Walkers by the Morgenbrodstal Ditch near Dammhaus

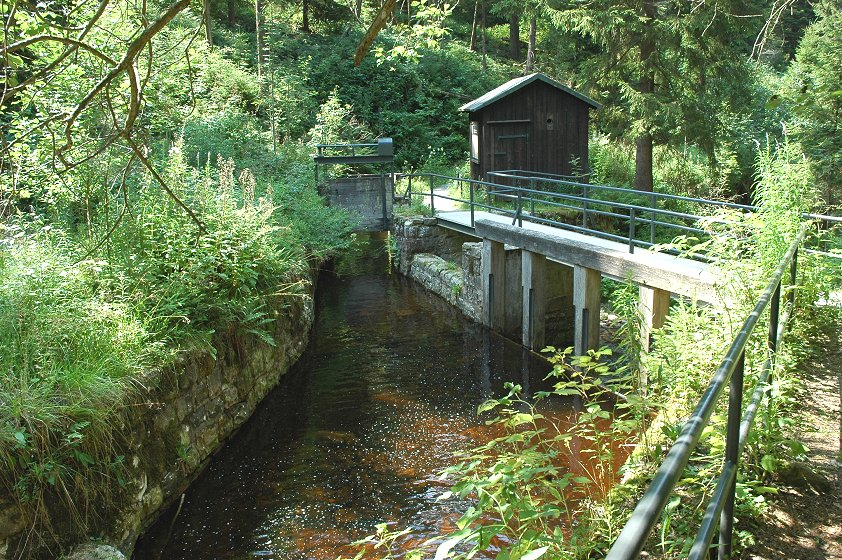
Regulating equipment for water supply on the Dam Ditch

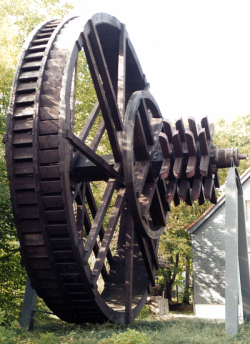
Reconstruction of a reversible water wheel, with a 9.5 metre diameter, in Clausthal-Zellerfeld

=== Structures ===
Reservoirs

The 143 reservoirs or storage ponds, known as Teiche (singular: Teich), were impounded using earth-fill dams. Dam heights varied between 4.0 and 15.0 metres; impoundment volumes were, on average, about 150,000 cubic metres.

Ditches

The ditches are supply channels almost parallel to the terrain contours, with a very slight incline of around 1–2 per mille and are accompanied by an inspection path.

Tunnels

The underground water tunnels of between 20 and 1000 metres long were the most expensive investments in the Upper Harz Water Regale. They were worth the cost however because of their low operating costs and high hydraulic capacity.

Special structures

- The Sperberhai Dyke is an aqueduct built from 1732 to 1734 with a length of over 900 metres and a height of 16 metres.
- The Oderteich differs considerably from the other Upper Harz ponds with regard to its construction materials and dimensions. Following its completion in 1722 to the start of the modern dam building period in 1892, it was the largest dam in Germany.
- In the Polsterberg Pumphouse water could be pumped from the Dam Ditch to a height of 8 metres using hydropower.
- The Huttaler Widerwaage is also frequently mentioned in this connexion: it is quite complex and enables water to flow in two different directions.
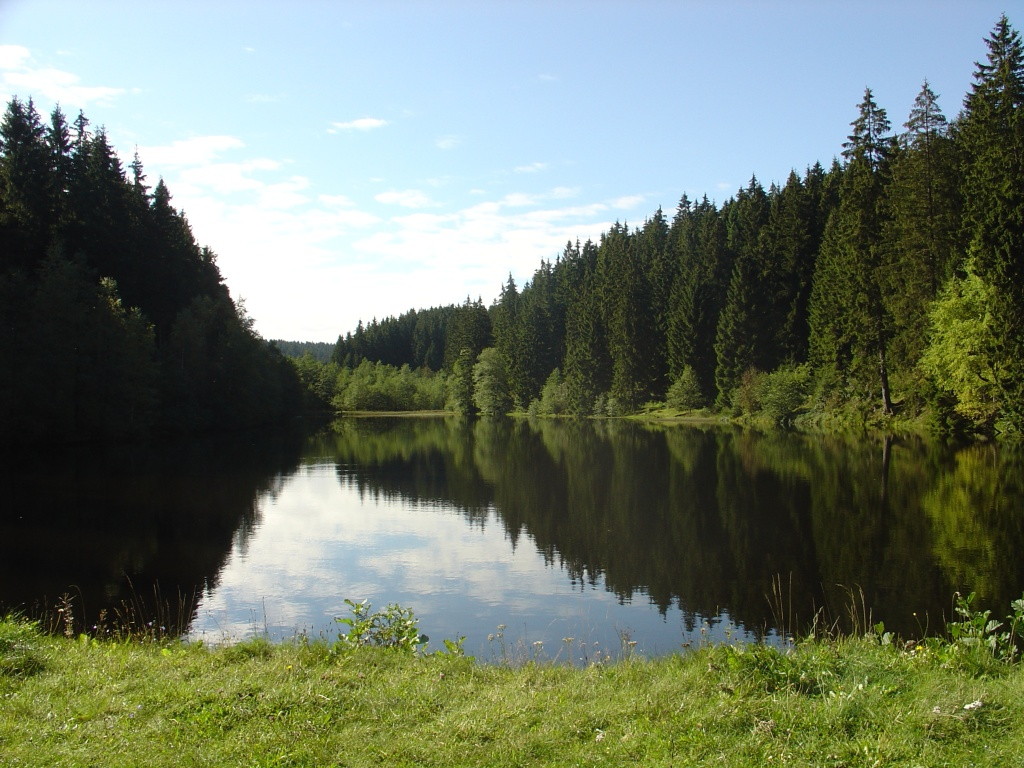
The Smelter Pond (Hüttenteich) near Altenau

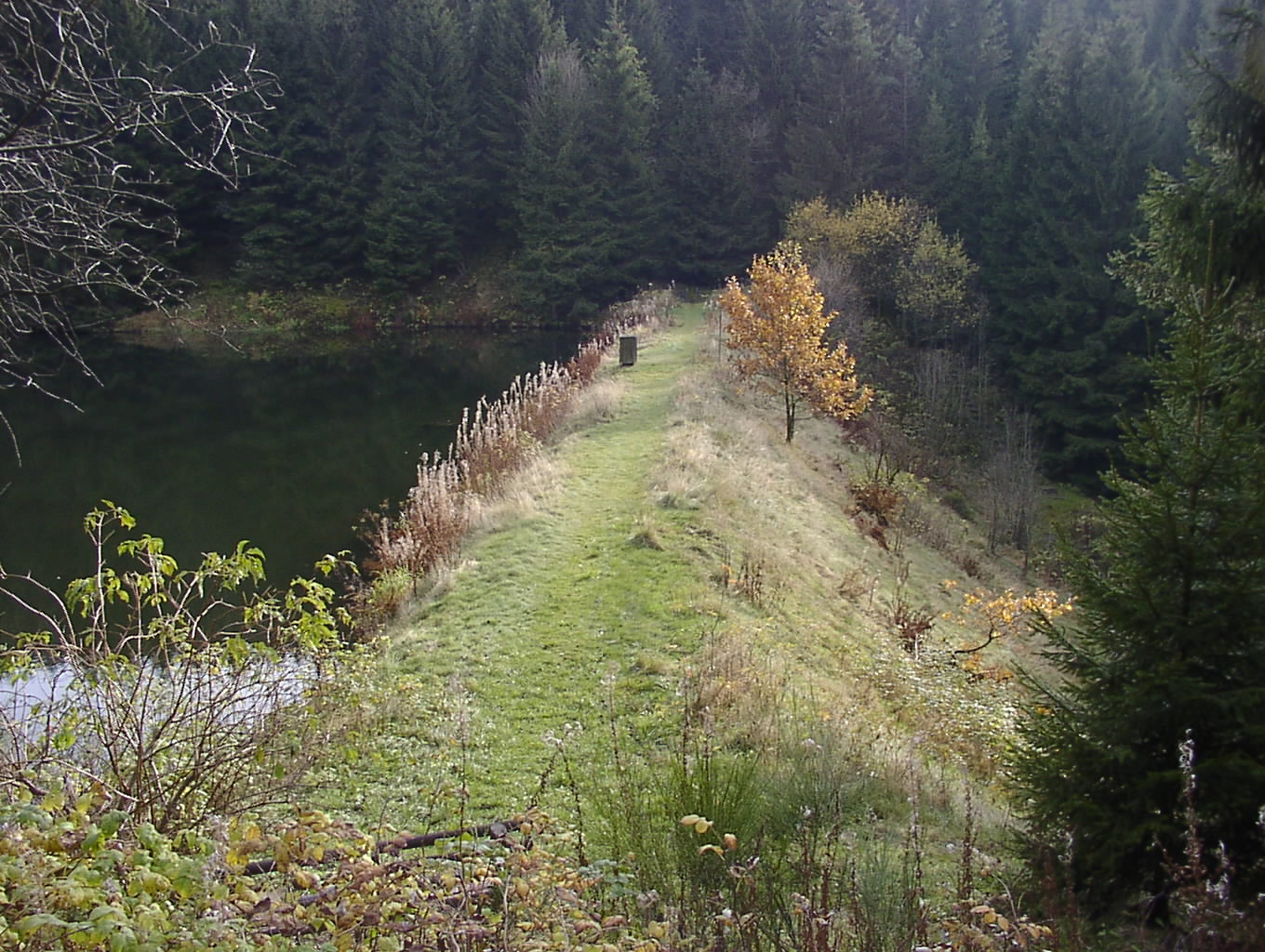
The dam of the Klein Clausthal Pond

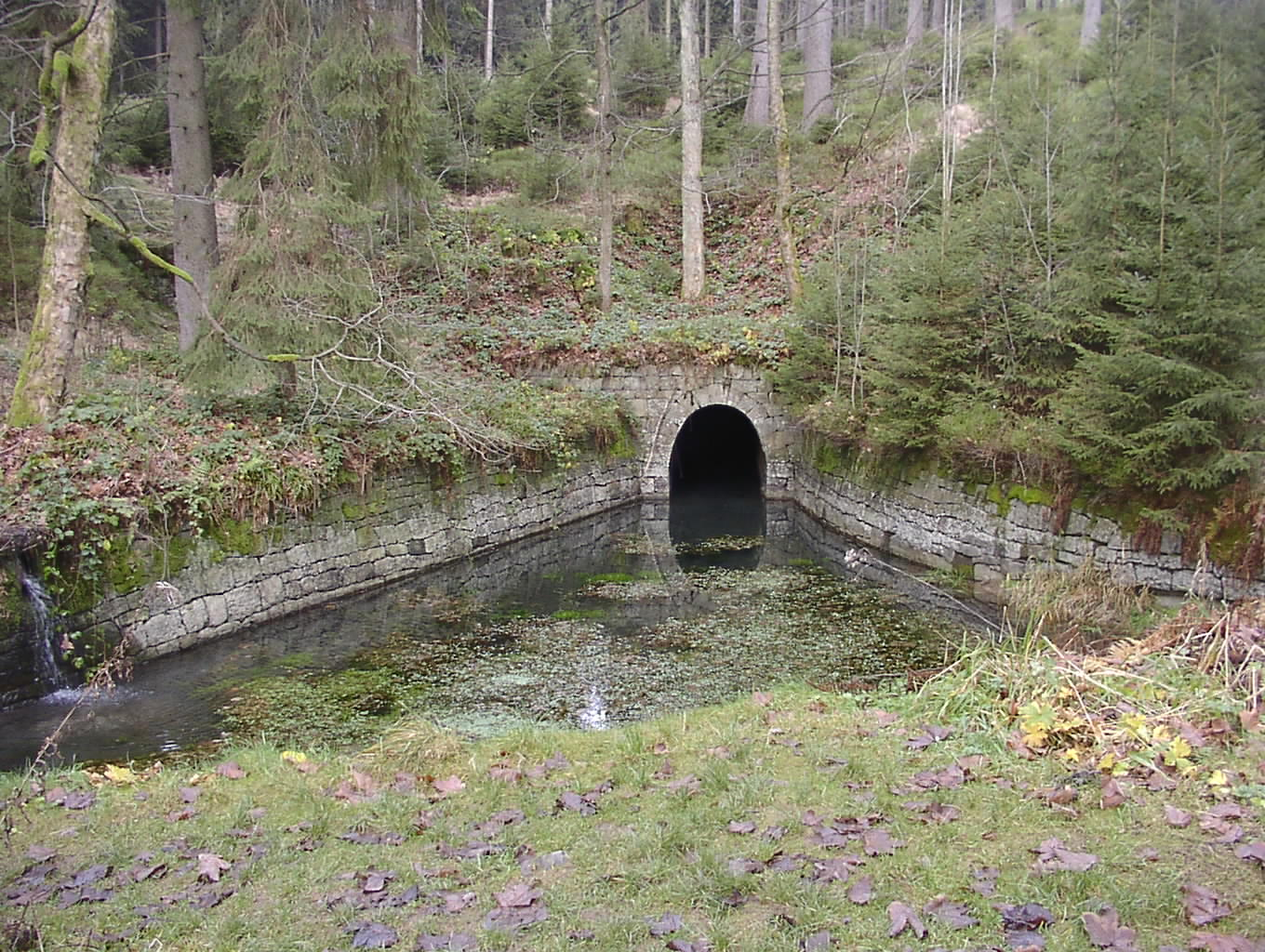
The Huttaler Widerwaage and portal of the Huttal Tunnel

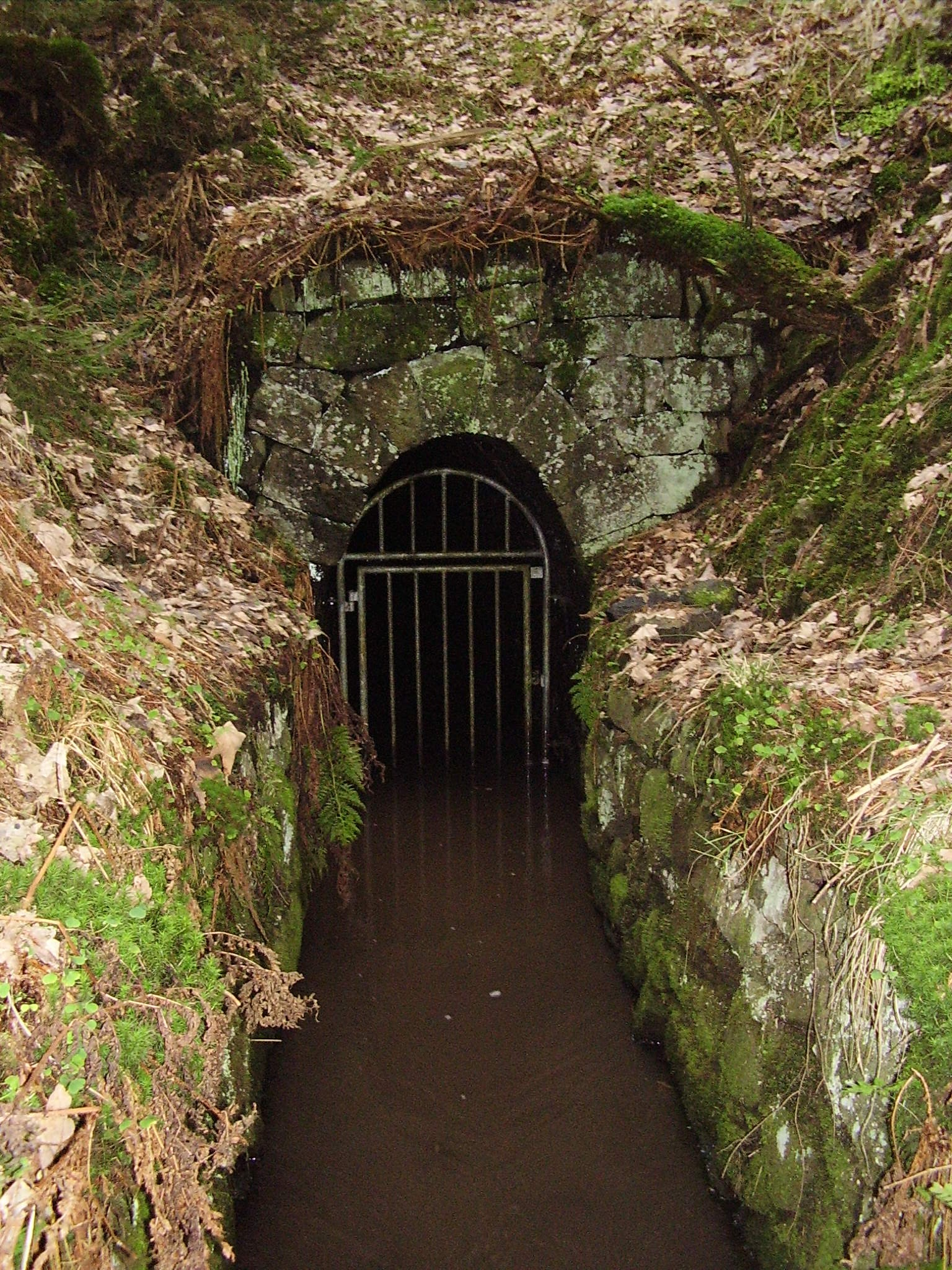
Exit portal of the Lower Hasenbach Tunnel

== Tourism ==
Due to the sheer number of structures and the length of the ditches the Upper Harz Water Regale is best explored on foot. Thanks to the Harzwasserwerke a large number of waterside footpaths have been created in recent years: the so-called Wasserwanderwege. Visitors can get to know about the typical elements that make up the Upper Harz Water Regale by means of information boards along the clearly marked routes. With a few exceptions, most of the ponds can be used by swimmers during the summer months. The majority are also leased to local angling clubs.

== History ==
=== Construction ===
Mining activity in the Harz goes back to the 10th and 11th centuries. The first water wheels in the Harz were erected in the 13th century in the Pandelbach valley southeast of Seesen. At that time mining, including this early use of the so-called waterworks (Wasserkünste) for the mines, was managed by the Cistercian abbey at Walkenried.

The Black Death in the Middle Ages depopulated the Harz to a great extent and almost brought mining operations to a standstill. Another factor was probably that mining had reached its technical limits at the time with depths of up to about 60 metres.

A clear recovery followed from about 1520 onwards, initially at the instigation of the Duke of Brunswick-Wolfenbüttel, Henry the Younger. But it was his son, Julius, Duke of Brunswick-Lüneburg, who gave added impetus to existing mining operations in the Upper Harz and initiated the creation of a large number of ponds and ditches.

It was the extensive use of hydropower that made the mining boom in the Upper Harz possible. As the mines became ever deeper over time they needed more and more energy. The lack of water following months of little rain or long periods of frost was time and again a limiting factor for the mines. The expansion of the water system was achieved by raising the existing pond dams, building new dams, laying new ditches and extending existing ditch runs.

=== Further improvements: water tunnels and drainage adits ===
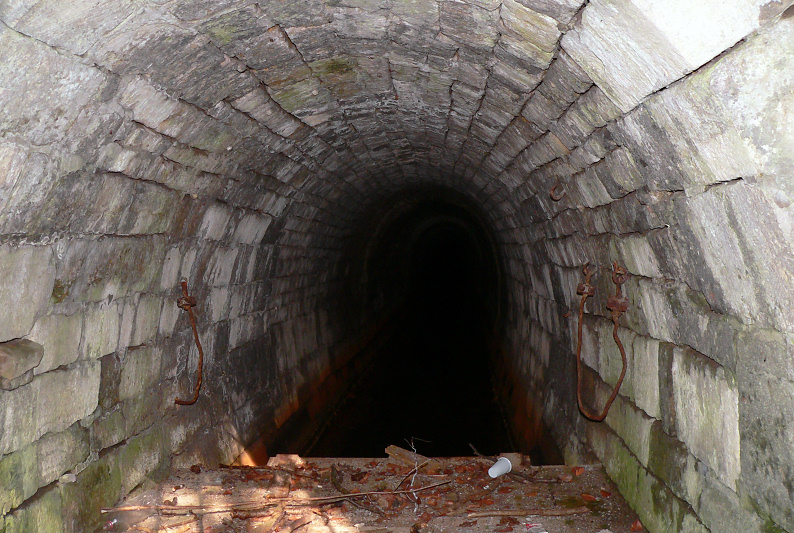
The Ernst August Adit

One example of the expansion of the Water Regale network was the optimisation of several ditch courses (the Dam Ditch, Upper and Lower Rosenhof Chutes), mainly during the 19th century, by the construction of so-called Wasserläufen (also Wasserüberleitungsstollen) or water tunnels. These enabled the distance travelled by the water to be significantly shortened. It also guaranteed winter working, because the water running underground did not freeze up. In addition the maintenance cost of a short section of tunnel was much cheaper than that of a long ditch run. But a particularly important advantage was the higher discharge capacity. The tunnels descended the same height difference over a shorter distance and therefore had a steeper incline. Initially the underground sections were laboriously hewn out with hammer and chisel. Later gunpowder was used as an explosive, making the construction of water tunnels considerably easier and faster.

Because most of the energy was needed to drain the mines of water and because the need for that continued to grow as mines became deeper, there were attempts early on, to dewater mines using drainage adits (Wasserlösungsstollen). This entailed driving tunnels from the mines to the valleys, through which water could drain away under gravity. The deeper the level of drainage, the longer the adit had to be. The longest of these tunnels is the Ernst August Adit, built in the mid-19th century, which is 35 kilometres long. It collected water from the mines in Bockswiese, Lautenthal, Zellerfeld, Clausthal and Wildemann and led it to Gittelde on the edge of the Harz.

=== Heyday and decline ===
About 80–90% of the ponds in the Upper Harz Water Regale were created in the 16th and 17th centuries, whilst the system of dam ditches was further expanded in the 19th century. These structures contributed significantly to the Harz becoming the largest industrial region of Germany in the early modern period. The invention of the steam engine and the discovery of electrical energy did not immediately change the use of hydropower. These other forms of energy were introduced relatively gradually in the Upper Harz. Of course, with the introduction of the steam engine, the difficulties of acquiring coal in sufficient quantities was also a factor until the construction of the Innerste Valley Railway.

With the nationalisation of the mines on 1 January 1864 by the Kingdom of Hanover, not only did mining rights now transfer to the state, but also the rights to water usage. So the Kingdom of Hanover also claimed the Water Regale, which was first legally defined in the Prussian Water Law (Preußisches Wassergesetz) of 1913 in sections 16 and 381. Following the absorption of the Kingdom of Hanover into the Kingdom of Prussia, the Royal Prussian Mining Inspectorate (Königlich-Preußische Bergbauinspektion) and, later, Preussag took over the operation of mines in the Upper Harz.

An inventory dating to the year 1868 reveals that a total of 198 water wheels of various diameters and a total capacity of about 3000 horsepower were driven by the Upper Harz Water Regale .

Around 1900, mining shaft depths of 1,000 metres were attained. But the cost of mining at greater and greater depths continued to rise. At the same time the industry had to compete with other metal mining areas at home and abroad in an era of improving transportation. Overexploitation during the First World War and plummeting metal prices during the Great Depression caused, at its peak, a great wave of closures, as large mines in Clausthal-Zellerfeld, Bockswiese and Lautenthal had to shut down. In Bad Grund, however, mining in the Upper Harz continued until 1992, but it only needed to use a small fraction of the facilities of the Upper Harz Water Regale.

=== Hydroelectric power ===
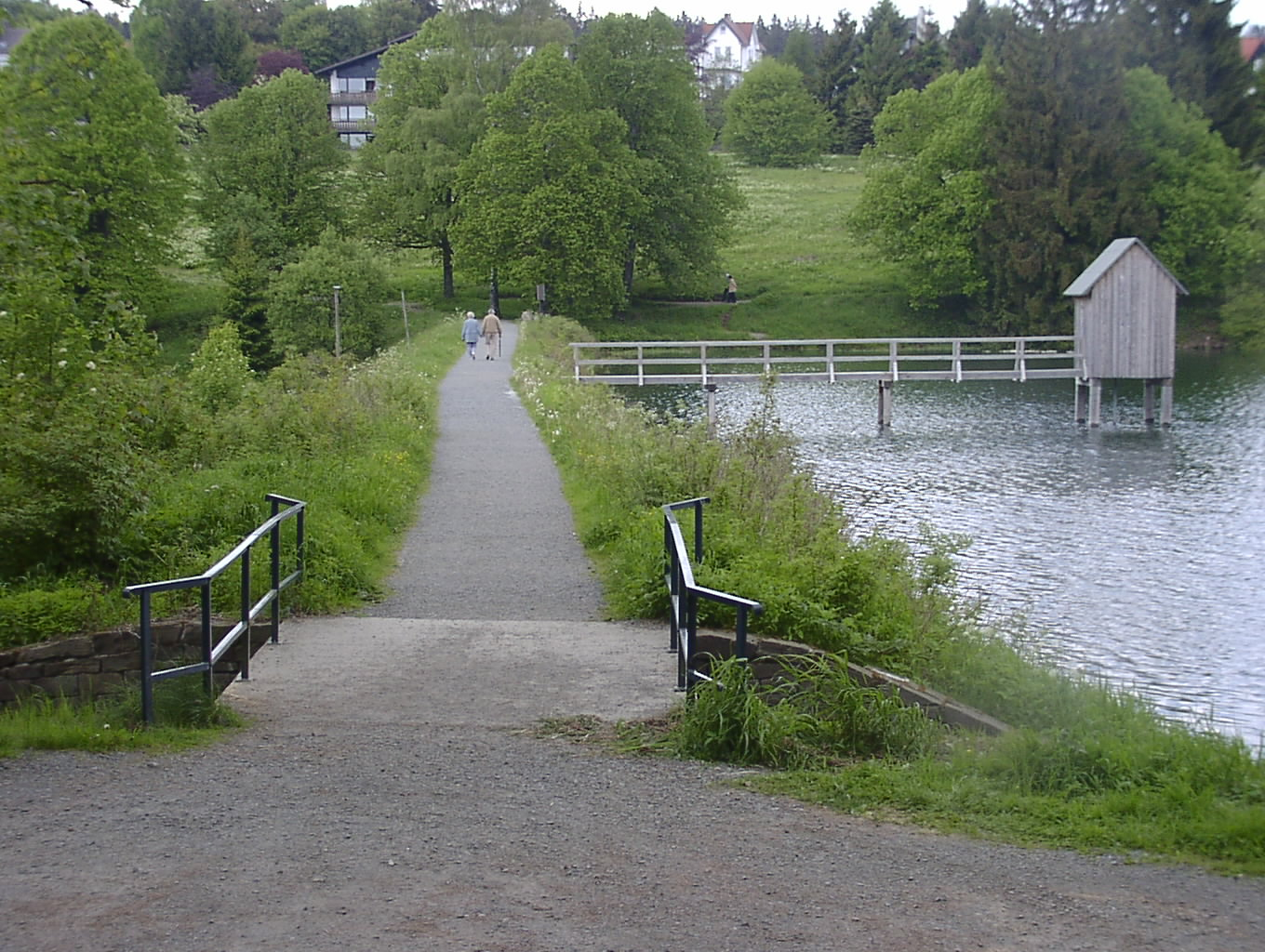
The Crane Pond (Kranicher Teich) near Hahnenklee with its control hut (Striegelhaus)

Following the demise of the mining industry in 1930, water from the Upper Harz Water Regale was switched to generating electricity, some new structures being built as a result. The generation of electricity was carried out by Preussag until 1980 in the Kaiser Wilhelm (maximum output 4.5 MW) and Ottiliae (maximum output 1.5 MW) mines. These hydropower stations were closed in the early 1980s when water rights had expired and the profitability of power stations steadily declined against a background of sharply increasing wages and stagnating energy prices. Nevertheless, in Sankt Andreasberg the water of the Oderteich, transferred along the Rehberg Ditch, is still used to generate electricity today. In addition to the Teichtal and Grundstraße power stations, there are two stations in the Samson Pit: the Grüner Hirsch power station at a depth of 130 metres and the Sieberstollen power station at 190 metres.

=== The Water Regale today ===
Following the closure of power stations the facilities of the Water Regale were initially transferred to the Lower Saxony State Forestry Department, which maintained them through the Clausthal-Schulenberg Forestry Office at the cost of much labour and money. In order to relieve the state purse, in 1991 the Harzwasserwerke was given the task of operating and maintaining 65 reservoirs, 70 kilometres of ditch and 20 kilometres of water tunnel. The Harzwasserwerke has delegated the management of the Upper Harz Water Regale to its Clausthal office. No public money is spent; the cost of maintenance, a seven-figure sum annually, has to be borne by the Harzwasserwerke through its sale of drinking water.

In addition to the facilities entrusted to the Harzwasserwerke there is a large number of dam ruins, tunnel entrances and several hundreds of kilometres of ditches that are not maintained. These structures enjoy the status of a so-called passive protected monument. That means that they are like the ruins of castles, subject to very gradual decay, but which may not be destroyed by modern measures without legal permission under conservation law.

The Hirschler Pond is used by the public utilities of Clausthal-Zellerfeld to supply drinking water to Clausthal-Zellerfeld and Altenau; similarly Zellerfeld uses the Upper and Middle Kellerhals Ponds. Hahnenklee gets its drinking water from the Auerhahn Pond, the New Grumbach Pond and the Upper Kellerhals Pond.

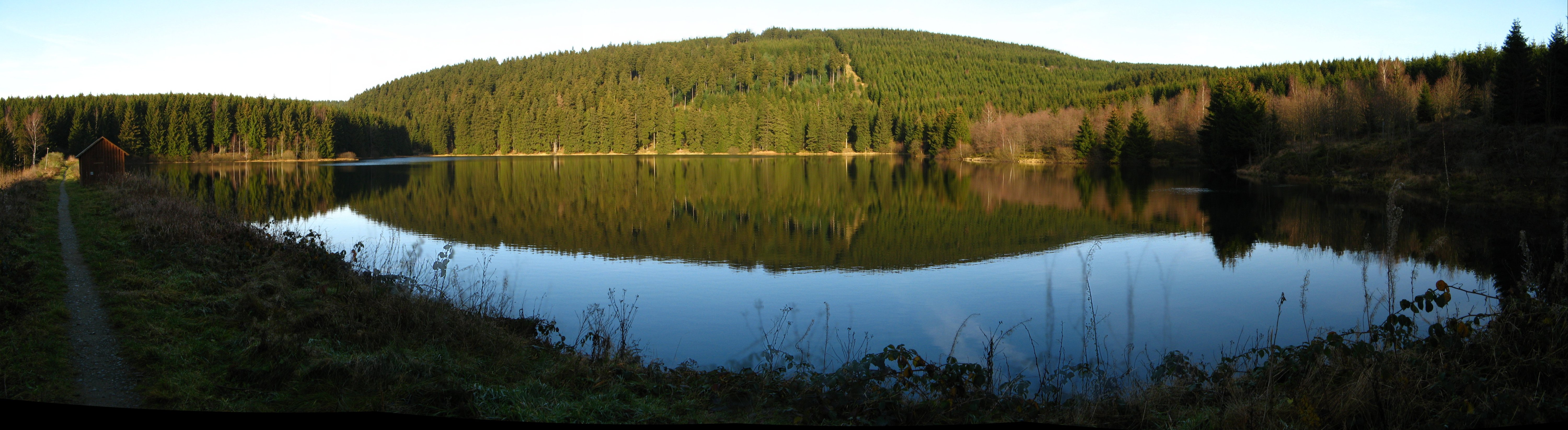
Large Kellerhals Pond, in the background the Kahle Berg, the western side of the Schalke

== Similar systems ==
There are similar water supply systems in the historic silver mining region near Freiberg in Saxony, in Norwegian Kongsberg, in Schemnitz (today part of Slovakia) and in Sweden, and records show that there was a regular exchange of experience and know-how between these regions. Nevertheless, the Upper Harz Water Regale, is the largest and most interconnected system of its kind in Europe, with significantly more dams and ditches as well as larger structures than all its counterparts elsewhere.

== See also ==
- Lower Harz Pond and Ditch System
- Kunstteich
- Kunstgraben
