= Kunstgraben =

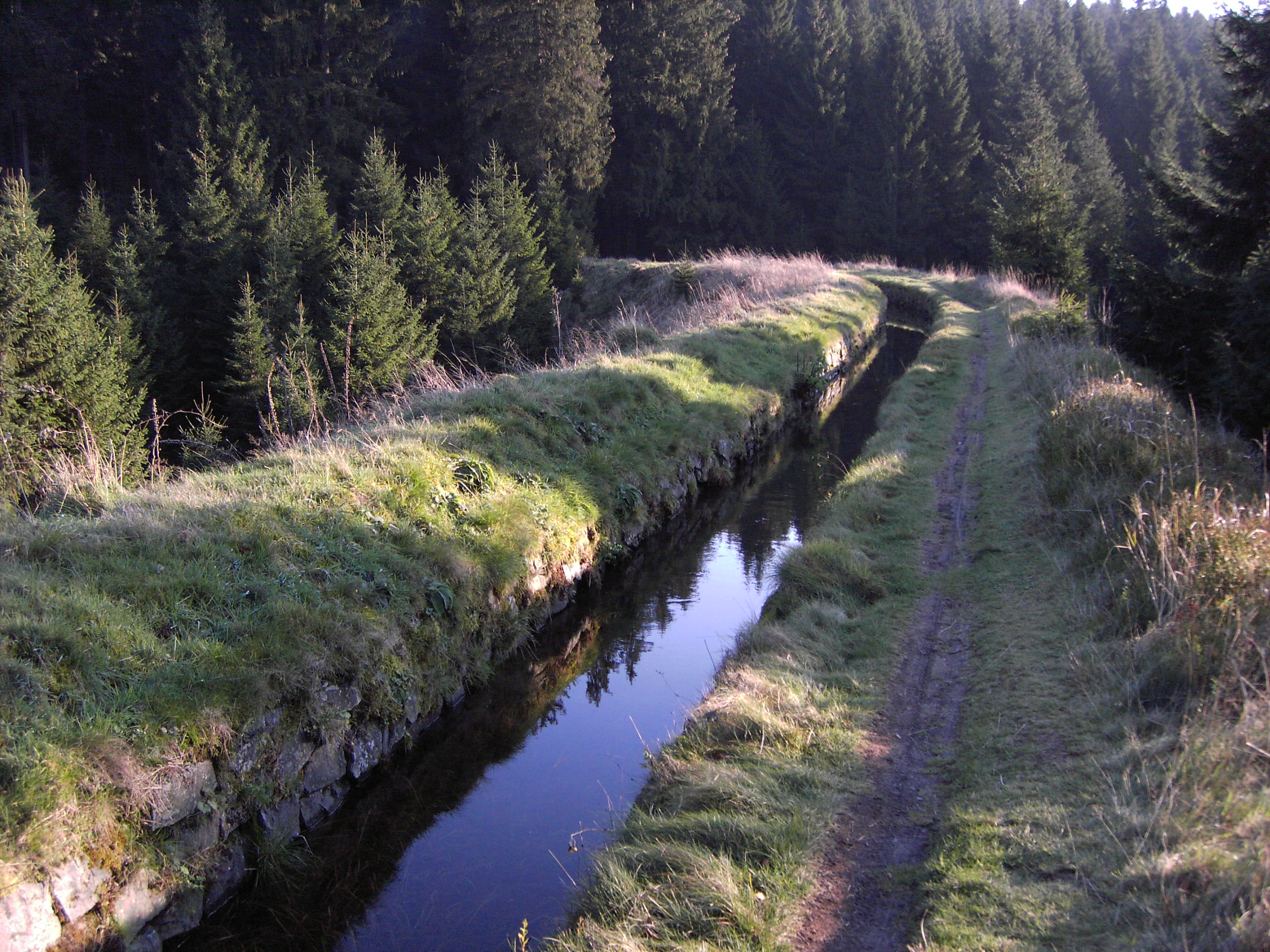
The Hutthal Ditch at the Unterer Hutthaler Teichdamm aqueduct

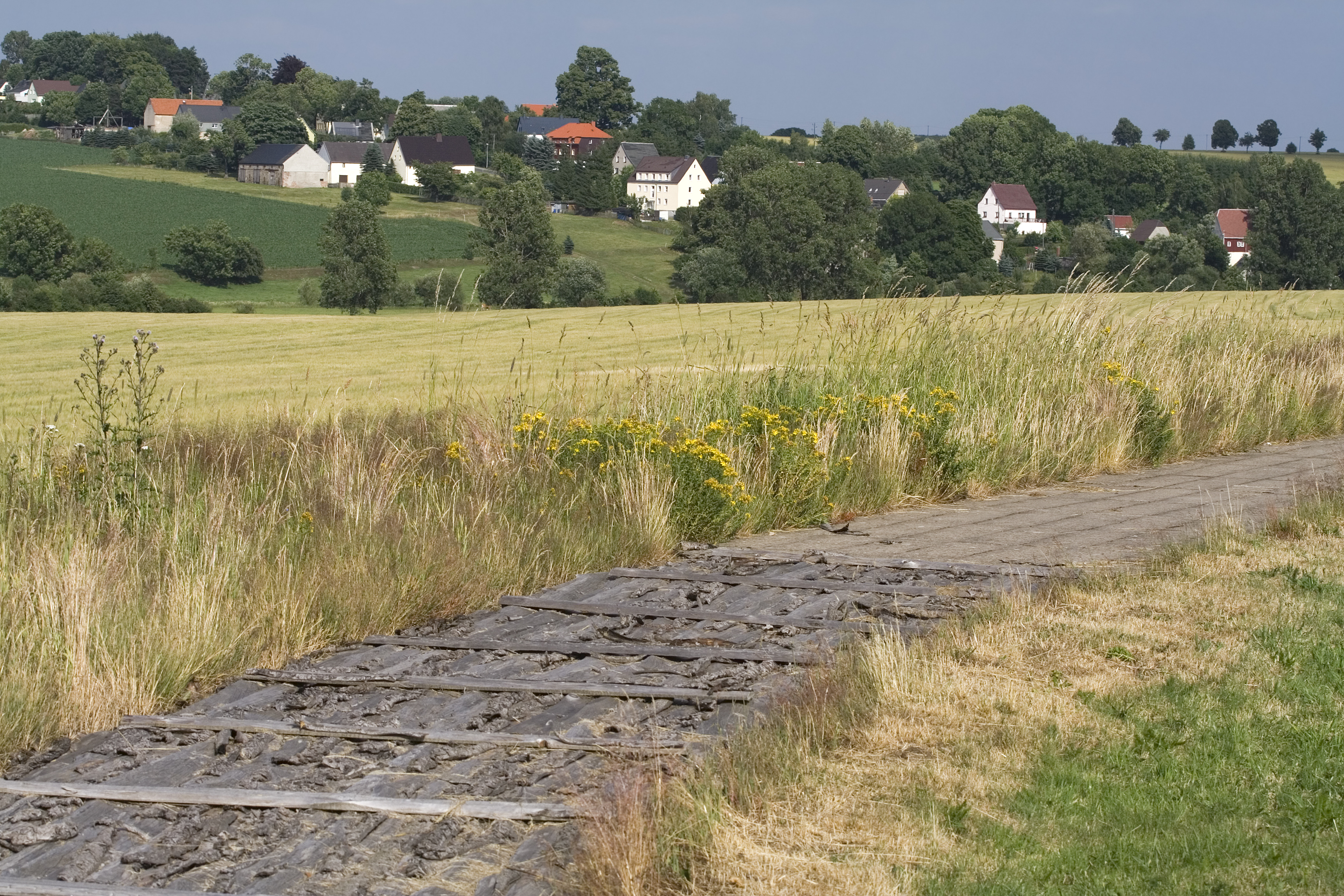
Covered section of the Hohbirker Kunstgraben near Brand-Erbisdorf

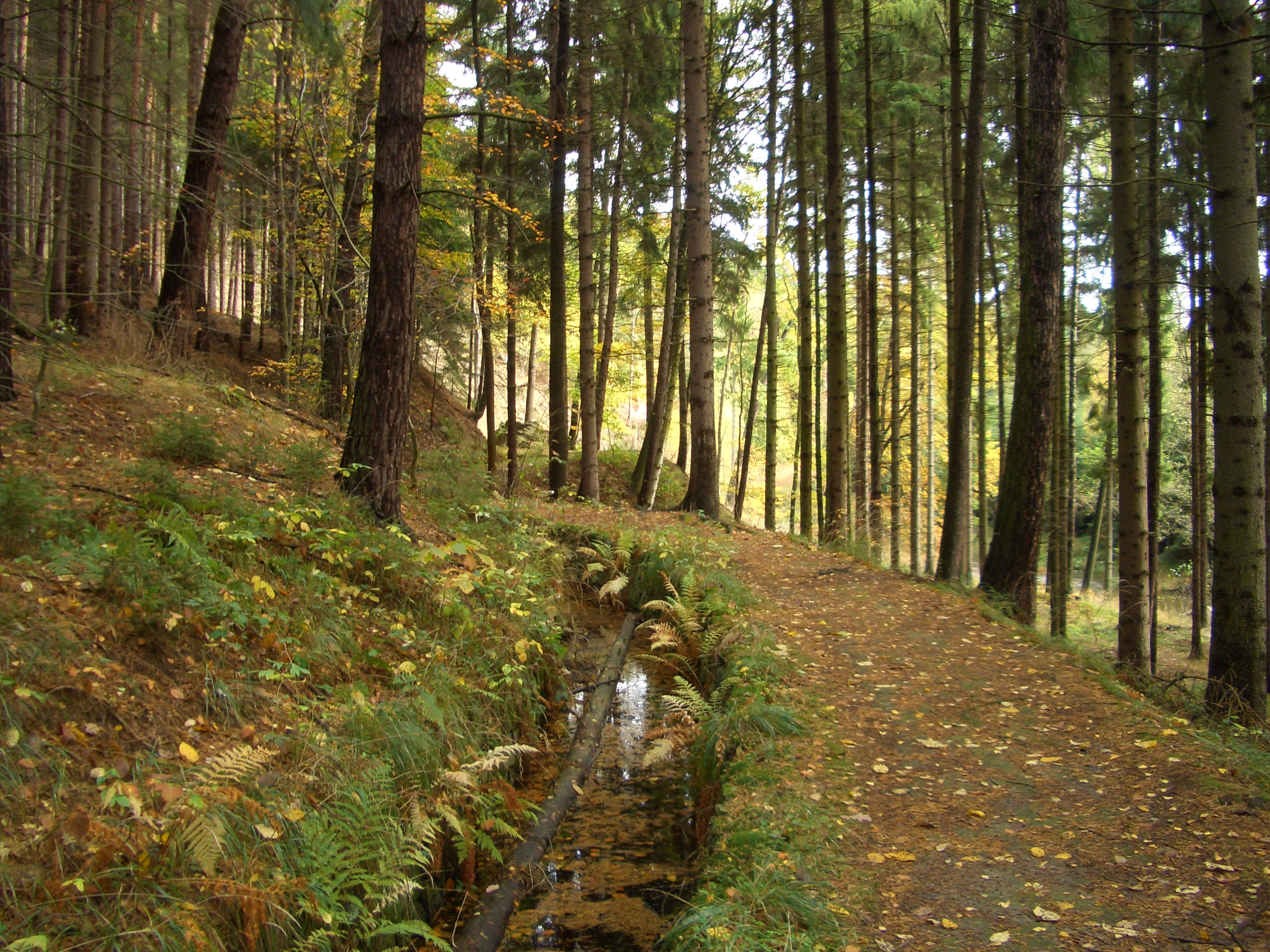
The Grabentour, Kunstgraben supplying ventilation shaft nos. IV and V of the Rothschönberg Gallery

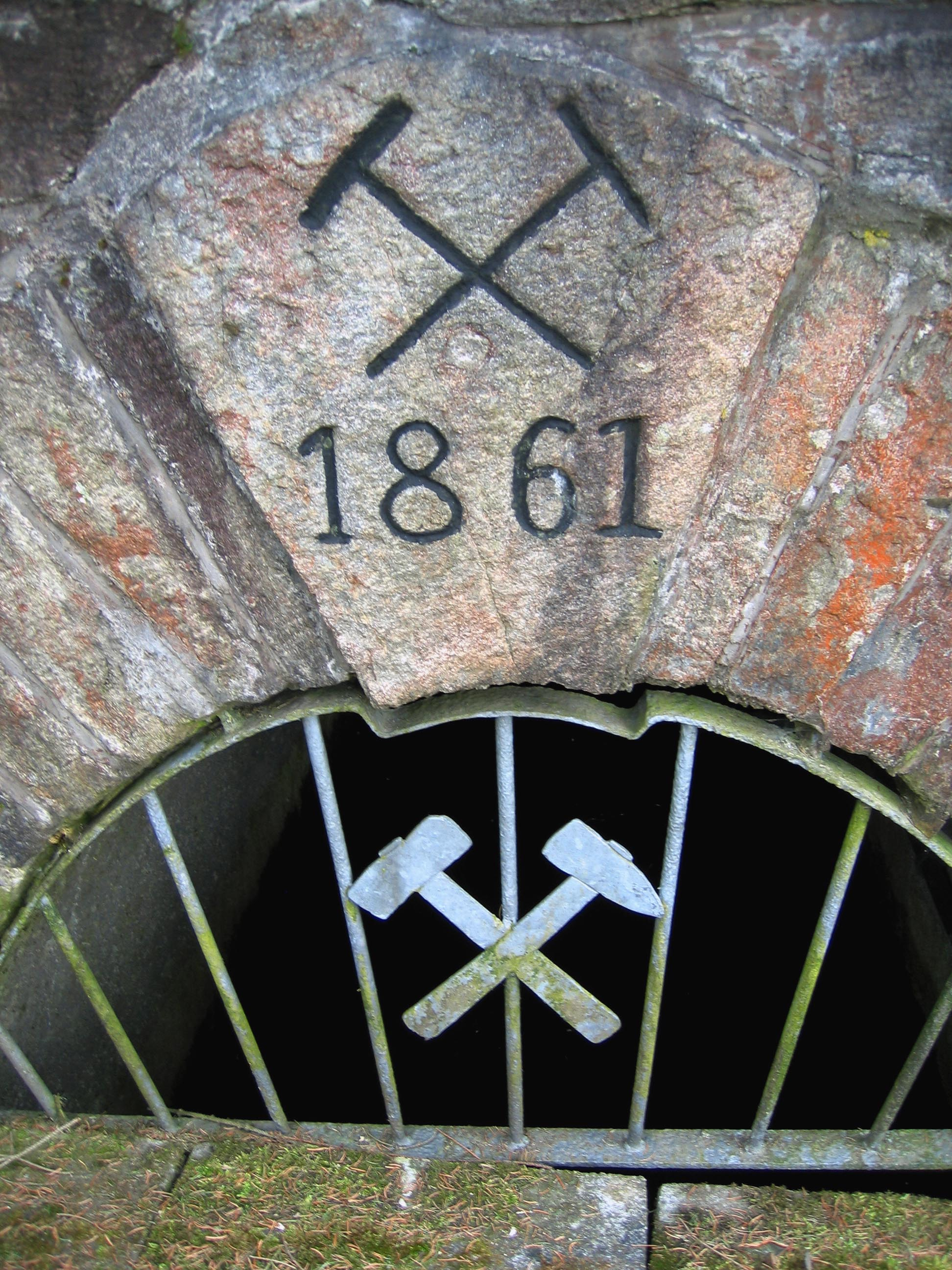
One of the portals of the Neuwernsdorfer Kunstgraben in Cämmerswalde

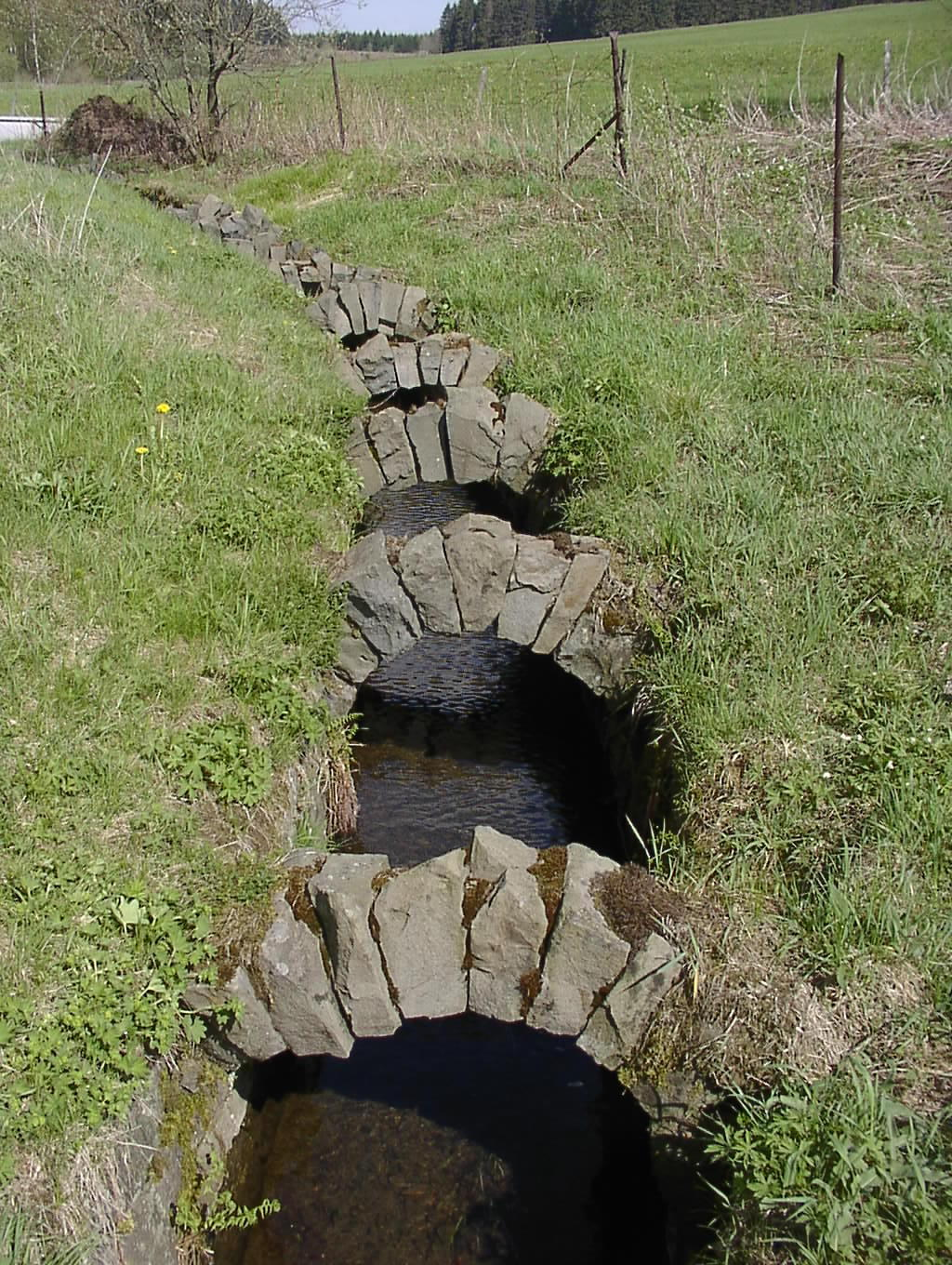
Vaulted arches over the Zellerfeld Kunstgraben

A Kunstgraben is a type of man-made water channel that was once used by mines to drive the water wheels needed for power, mine drainage and a host of other purposes. The term is German (plural: Kunstgräben). Similar ditches supplying water mills in England are called leats.

== Background ==
Until the invention of the steam engine, water power was the main source of energy utilised by the various mechanical engines employed in the mining industry, such as water wheels, reversible water wheels, water-column engines or water turbines.

To enable mine workings to be driven ever deeper, more and more power was needed. The water available in the vicinity of the pits was insufficient for that purpose and springs frequently dried up as a result of be diverted for use in the mines. As a result, the water needed for the mine workings sometimes had to be transported over long distances.

== Usage ==
The aim was to have the greatest possible height difference at the site of the water power engine. This difference is known as the height of impact (Aufschlaghöhe). To achieve this the Kunstgräben were laid with only a very slight gradient, so that they resembled contours in the terrain and followed all the twists and turns of the valleys. In order to overcome natural obstacles Kunstgräben were frequently led along the bottom of tunnels in so-called Röschen or, more rarely, over aqueducts; the best-known Kunstgraben aqueducts being the Altväter Bridge near Halsbrücke and the Sperberhai Dyke in the Harz Mountains.

Typically a Kunstgraben started at a weir or divert (Wasserteiler) and ran along Röschen and via water storage ponds or Kunstteiche to the pit. The water power engine usually had a headrace and a tailrace (Aufschlagrösche and Abzugsrösche). A footpath was laid parallel to the Kunstgraben that acted as an access route for the ditch overseer (Grabensteiger), whenever he went to the weir to adjust the paddles. These paths are frequently used as walking trails today, where they have survived.

The Kunstgräben were often covered by rough boards (Schwarten). These acted, on the one hand, to keep the ditches clear and protect them from becoming overgrown and, on the other hand, to protect the ditches from destruction by cattle. It also helped to defend the owners of the ditches from the claims of neighbouring landowners, who had otherwise to be compensated for the loss of income and land resulting from the construction of Kunstgräben and who often brought claims as a result of allegedly drowned livestock and game.

== Well-known examples ==
- Dyke Ditch (Dammgraben)
- Neugrabenflöße
- Upper Harz Ditches
- Upper Harz Water Tunnels

== See also ==
- Lower Harz Pond and Ditch System
- Upper Harz Water Regale
- Kunstteich
- Leat

== Sources ==
- Georg Agricola (2006), De Re Metallica Libri XII: Zwölf Bücher vom Berg– und Hüttenwesen (unveränderter Nachdruck der Erstausgabe des VDI-Verlags 1928 ed.), Wiesbaden: Marixverlag, ISBN 3-86539-097-8
- Gunther Galinsky, ed. (1988), Reymann: Fotodokumentaristen der Bergstadt Freiberg 1865–1945 (in German) (2. verbesserte ed.), Leipzig: Fotokinoverlag, ISBN 3-7311-0003-7
- Lysann Petermann (2005), "Der Rothschönberger Stolln", Reihe Bergbauhistorie der Klosterregion Altzella (in German), Reinsberg
- Herbert Pforr: Das erzgebirgische Kunstgrabensystem und die Wasserkraftmaschinen für Wasserhaltung und Schachtförderung im historischen Freiberger Silberbergbau. In: Bergbau Heft 11/2007, S. 502-505 (Digitalisat)
- Siegfried Sieber (1954), Zur Geschichte des erzgebirgischen Bergbaues (in German), Halle (Saale): Wilhelm-Knapp-Verlag, p. 135
- Otfried Wagenbreth (1988), Eberhard Wächtler (ed.), Der Freiberger Bergbau: Technische Denkmale und Geschichte (in German) (2nd ed.), Leipzig: Deutscher Verlag für Grundstoffindustrie, ISBN 3-342-00117-8

== See also ==
- Mining in the Upper Harz
- Man engine
