= Rösche =

German mining term

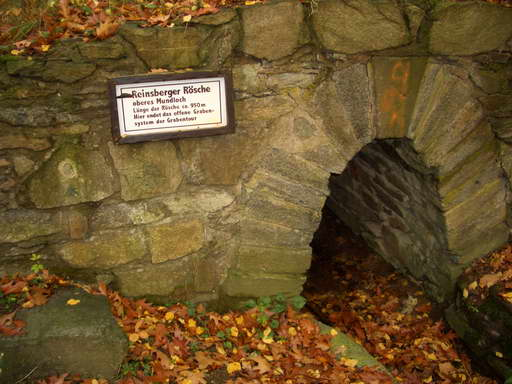
Upper gallery mouth of the Reinsberger Rösche

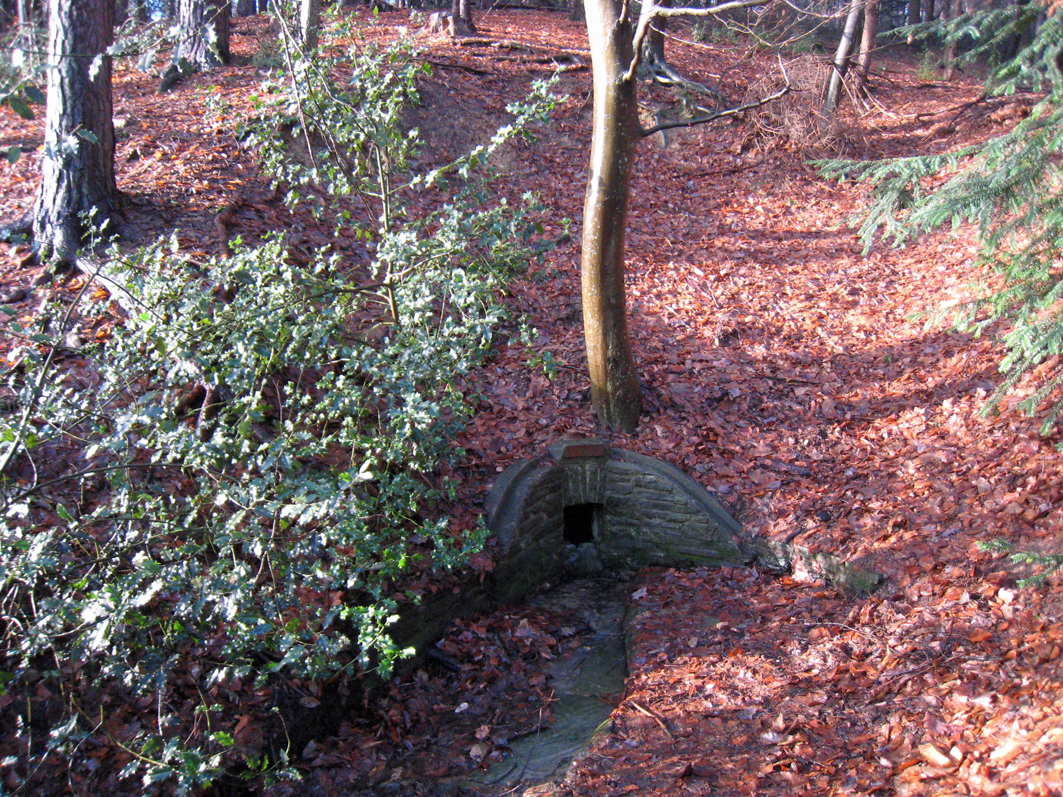
Broken gallery mouth of the Idria Pit in Bergisch Gladbach. The Rösche, reinforced by stonework, still drains the mine of water.

A Rösche is a German mining term that refers inter alia to a gullet (Wasserseige), a trench for draining water in the lower part of a mine gallery. In order to keep the actual gallery entrance (Stollenmundloch) free and guard against backflooding the Röschen were, in many cases, extended to below the entrance or led even further away, underground, to the nearest stream or river.

By contrast the term Rösche was also used to describe the channels or "leats" through which the driving water for mining equipment was led into the pit (Aufschlagrösche or driving water leats) or out of the pit (Abfallrösche or drainage leats). Unlike a gallery, a leat will have a gentle incline into the pit.

Also referred to as a Rösche are the tunnel-like sections of mining ditch (Kunstgraben) systems. These are not underground structures. In the Harz Mountains of Germany such a tunnel is also known as a Wasserlauf. See Upper Harz Water Tunnels.

A recess in the stowage for the extraction of ventilation in mining is called a Wetter-Rösche.
