= Margaret Owen =

Margaret Owen may refer to:

- Margaret Owen (actress), American burlesque actress and decoy
- Margaret Owen (plantswoman) (née Mackay 1930–2014), expert in snowdrops
- Margaret Owen (author), American novelist
- Margaret Lloyd George (née Owen, 1864–1941), wife of David Lloyd George
- Margaret Ursula Jones (née Owen, 1916–2001), British archaeologist
