= William McNamara (disambiguation) =

William McNamara (born 1965) is an American actor.

William McNamara may also refer to:

- William J. McNamara (1879–?), mayor of Edmonton
- William Craig McNamara (1904–1984), president of the Canadian Wheat Board and Canadian Senator
- Bill McNamara (1876–1959), Australian rules footballer
- William McNamara (soldier) (1835–1912), Irish-born soldier in the 4th U.S. Army Cavalry
- William McNamara (horticulturist), American horticulturist
