= Baby Bio =

Two bottles of Baby Bio. The traditional brown version on the left and the more modern formula for Orchids on the right.

Baby Bio is the brand name for a range of house plant and, more recently, outdoor plant care products created by Pan Britannica Industries Ltd (PBI) and currently owned by French company, SBM Life Science.

== History ==
The most popular and first Baby Bio product was a house plant feed, or fertilizer, which is a dark brown concentrate that must be diluted with water before use. Coming in a bottle styled after an old fashioned perfume bottle, it contains Nitrogen, Phosphorus and Potassium, ensuring that the plant receives the necessary macronutrients. Baby Bio is a very popular house plant feed in the UK and can be used all year round, even on Bonsai plants, with the text on the bottle promising greener leaves and vibrant colours. Part of the popularity of the brand in the UK arose from the success of Dr Hessayon's series of Expert books, which also came from PBI starting in 1958.

As well as concentrate bottles of Baby Bio, it has now been produced in ready dilute spray and 1 litre bottles that contain pesticides too, 'Roota', a rooting hormone and fungicide solution designed to be used on the roots of plant cuttings, and leaf wipes for cleaning house plant leaves. An orchid feed is available which comes in the same bottle as the original Baby Bio except the liquid and design has a pink theme. The concentrated liquid fertilizer is exactly half of what can be found in the traditional bottle.

Baby Bio is also often used in biology experimentation when studying algal growth.
