= Bertie Thomas Percival Barker =

British horticulturalist (1877-1961)

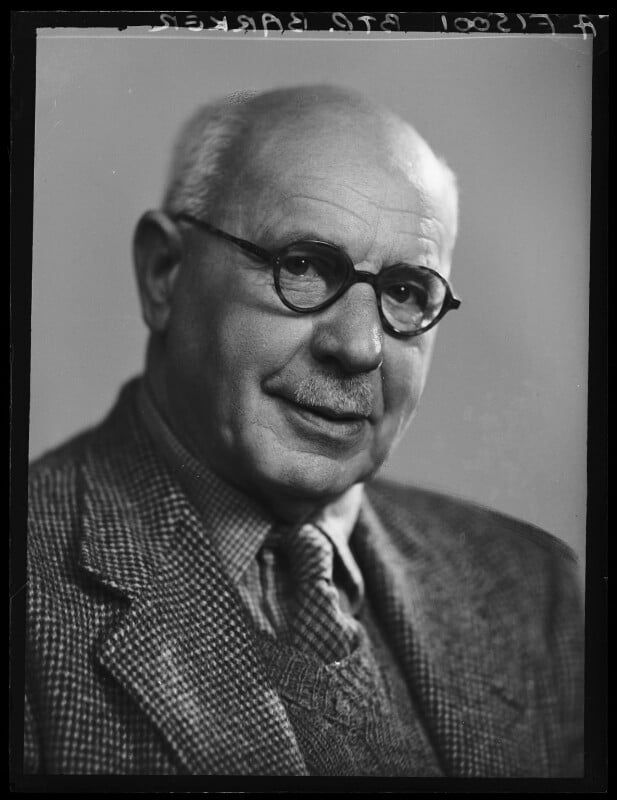
Barker in 1952

Bertie Thomas Percival Barker CBE (9 August 1877 – 19 December 1961) was an English horticulturalist, plant pathologist, mycologist, and botanist. He is known for his research in the pomology of apples and the applied science of cider production.

== Education and career ==
Barker was born and grew up in Cambridge. After education at The Perse School, he matriculated in 1895 at Gonville and Caius College, Cambridge. There he graduated with B.A. in 1899 and M.A. in 1902. From 1899 to 1904 he did mycological and botanical research under the supervision of Harry Marshall Ward and held the post of demonstrator in the botany department of the University of Cambridge. For his research, Barker was awarded in 1901 the Walsingham Gold Medal.

In 1904 Barker became the assistant director of the National Fruit and Cider Institute, which was established in 1903 at Long Ashton. He was given the responsibility of doing research on cider-making and cider-orcharding, under the direction of Frederick James Lloyd. In 1905 Lloyd resigned and Barker became the institute's director and sought collaborators from the University of Bristol, about 6.5 km (4 miles) distant. Barker and Joseph Hubert Priestley developed the institute and enhanced its prestige, helping cider production for large-scale factory operations and improved quality control. In 1912 the National Fruit and Cider Institute was renamed the Long Ashton Research Station and its legal status was changed to the University of Bristol's Department of Agricultural and Horticultural Research. From 1912 until his retirement in 1943, Barker was the director of the Long Ashton Research Institute and also held an appointment as Professor of Agricultural Biology at the University of Bristol. During WW I, he and his co-workers did research on fruit preservation by canning and bottling, as well as manufacturing jams and jellies. As an outgrowth of this research, the Chipping Campden Research Station was established in 1918 and Barker was its director from 1921 to 1935. Barker's knowledge of cider-making led him to be one of the judges for national competitions involving cider-making for agricultural shows, such as the Royal Show, the Royal Bath and West Show, and the Three Counties Show. He did important research on orchard applications of sulphur-based insecticides and fungicides, as well as the fungicide Bordeaux mixture. For many years Barker served as an examiner for the National Diploma in Horticulture of the Royal Horticultural Society. From 1924 to 1944 he was, with Sir Ronald Hatton, joint editor of the Journal of Pomology and Horticultural Science. The Journal of Pomology and Horticultural Science was published from 1919 to 1947 and then superseded from 1948 to 1997 by the Journal of Horticultural Science, which was renamed in 1998 the Journal of Horticultural Science and Biotechnology.

In 1952 Barker was awarded the Veitch Memorial Medal and was also created Commander of the Order of the British Empire (CBE).

== Family ==
In 1906 Bertie Thomas Percival Barker married Ethel Norman (1882–1937). They had three daughters and two sons. In July 1938 B. T. P. Barker married Alicia Erskine Maunsell (1905–1971). Bertie and Alicia Barker had a daughter Shirley.

== Selected publications ==
- Barker, B. T. P. (1900). "A Fragrant 'Mycoderma' Yeast, Saccharomyces anomalus (Hansen)". Annals of Botany. 14 (54): 215–244. doi:10.1093/oxfordjournals.aob.a088775. JSTOR 43235103.
- Barker, B. T. P. (1901). "IX. A conjugating "yeast."". Philosophical Transactions of the Royal Society of London. Series B, Containing Papers of a Biological Character. 194 (194–206): 467–485. doi:10.1098/rstb.1901.0010.
- Barker, B. T. P. (1901). "Sexual Spore-Formation Among the Saccharo-Mycetes". Annals of Botany. 15 (60): 759–764. doi:10.1093/oxfordjournals.aob.a088848. JSTOR 43236594.
- Barker, B. T. P. (1903). "The Morphology and Development of the Ascocarp in Monascus". Annals of Botany. 17 (65): 167–236. doi:10.1093/oxfordjournals.aob.a088910. JSTOR 43235667.
- Pearce, Elsie B.; Barker, B. T. P. (1908). "The Yeast Flora of Bottled Ciders". The Journal of Agricultural Science. 3: 55–79. doi:10.1017/S0021859600000745.
- Barker, B. T. P. (1908). "The Rate of Fermentation of Ciders and Perries". The Journal of Agricultural Science. 3: 1–21. doi:10.1017/S002185960000071X.
- Barker, B. T. P.; Russell, Edward (1909). "The composition of cider". The Analyst. 34 (397): 125b. Bibcode:1909Ana....34..125B. doi:10.1039/AN909340125B.
- Barker, B. T. P. (1911). "The Principles and Practice of Cider Making". Journal of the Institute of Brewing. 17 (5): 425–451. doi:10.1002/j.2050-0416.1911.tb04707.x.
- Barker, B. T. P.; Gimingham, C. T. (1911). "The Fungicidal Action of Bordeaux Mixtures". The Journal of Agricultural Science. 4: 76–94. doi:10.1017/S0021859600001489.
- Barker, B. T. P.; Hillier, V. Florian (1912). "Cider Sickness". The Journal of Agricultural Science. 5: 67–85. doi:10.1017/S0021859600001799.
- Barker, B. T. P. (1913). "Further Observations on Cider Sickness". Journal of the Institute of Brewing. 19 (2): 58–83. doi:10.1002/j.2050-0416.1913.tb02306.x.
- Barker, B. T. P.; Grove, Otto (1913). "The Acetification of Cider and Perry". Annual Report of the Agricultural and Horticultural Research Station: 29–33.
- Barker, B. T. P.; Grove, O. (1926). "Sulphur Dioxide as a Preservative for Fruit". Journal of Pomology and Horticultural Science. 5: 50–60. doi:10.1080/03683621.1925.11513288.
- Barker, B. T. P. (1927). "Investigations on the Fungicidal Action of Sulphur". Annual Report of the Agricultural and Horticultural Research Station: 72–80.
- Barker, B. T. P. (1937). Cider Apple Production. Volume 104 of Bulletin (Great Britain. Ministry of Agriculture, Fisheries and Food). London: H. M. Stationery Office.
  - 2nd edition. 1954. LCCN 54037735; iv+64 pages, illustrated
- Barker, B. T. P. (1953). "Long Ashton Research Station, 1903-53". Journal of Horticultural Science. 28 (3): 149–151. doi:10.1080/00221589.1953.11513779.
- 3 chapters in: Wallace, Thomas; Marsh, R. W., eds. (1953). Science and Fruit: Commemorating the Jubilee of the Long Ashton Research Station, 1903-1953.
  - Long Ashton Research Institution: its origin and development, 1903–1953 by T. Wallace & B. T. P. Barker, pp. 11–27
  - Cider and cider-making fifty years ago by B. T. P. Barker, pp. 29–44
  - Cider apple varieties then and now; a survey of vintage-quality trials by B. T. P. Barker & L. F. Burroughs, pp. 45–55
