= James Beard (disambiguation) =

James Beard (James Andrews Beard, 1903–1985) was an American chef and food writer.

James Beard may also refer to:

- James Henry Beard (1814–1893), American painter
- James Beard (architect) (1924–2017), New Zealand architect
- James B. Beard (1935–2018), American agronomist
- Jim Beard (1960–2024), American musician
