= Thomas Wallace (horticulturalist) =

British horticulturalist (1891–1965)

Thomas Wallace MC FIC FRS CBE (5 September 1891 – 1 February 1965) was a British professor of horticultural chemistry. He gained fame as one of the world's leading experts on mineral deficiencies in plants.

== Early life and education ==
Thomas Wallace had five older sisters, one younger sister, and two older brothers. Their father Thomas Sr. was a blacksmith and agricultural mechanic. As a boy, Thomas Jr. worked as a farm hand and attended a local primary school in Burradon until 1905 when he won a County of Northumberland scholarship to Rutherford College of Technology in Newcastle. In 1910 he matriculated at Armstrong College, University of Durham. There he had a brilliant academic career, studying principally chemistry, but also physics, mathematics, botany, and zoology. He was College Prizeman in inorganic, organic and analytical chemistry and Alder Scholar in zoology. In 1913 he graduated with a BSc degree in chemistry.

== WW I service ==
At Armstrong College, Wallace joined the University of Durham Officers’ Training Corps and distinguished himself by his outstanding conduct. At the outbreak of WW I, he was commissioned in the Special Reserve of Officers and assigned to the 3rd Border Regiment. He was soon sent to France and as an officer, attached to the Royal West Kent Regiment, fought in France and Belgium in the early part of WW I. He received in 1914 the Mons Star. In 1915 he was reattached to the Border Regiment which was part of the 29th Division serving in Gallipoli. He participated in the actions at Cape Helles and Suvla Bay. Near Krithea in Cape Helles, he won one of the UK's earliest Military Crosses to be awarded in the Gallipoli campaign. After surviving unwounded in his Gallipoli service, Wallace was in 1916 sent to France as an adjutant in 11th Sussex Regiment. In July 1916 at Richebourg-l'Avoué he was severely wounded, leaving him with permanent, serious joint stiffness in his left knee. After sufficient recovery from his wounds, Wallace was assigned to the Anti-Gas Department of the Royal Engineers. He attained the rank of captain. Wallace's first research was done on the chemistry of gases used in WW I.

== Career at the University of Bristol ==
After working for a brief time as an industrial chemist for the Castner-Kellner Alkali Company, Wallace became in May 1919 a research chemist at the Long Ashton Research Station (part of the University of Bristol). Simultaneously, he was the Advisory Officer in Agricultural Chemistry for the Bristol Province. At the Long Ashton Research Station, he was from 1923 to 1943 the deputy director and from 1943 to 1957 the Director. After previously holding appointments as Lecturer and Reader, Wallace was appointed Professor of Horticultural Chemistry in the University of Bristol in 1943 and retained his professorship until 1957 when he retired as professor emeritus.

Wallace was the author or co-author of about 100 scientific articles. In 1921 he published an important contribution to pomology by showing that leaf scorch was sometimes due to a soil deficiency of potassium and could be cured by manurial treatment or adding potash. He did research on many aspects of horticulture. He published on the problem of winter-killing of vegetable crops and frost damage to apple trees. From 1943 to 1958 he was joint editor of the Journal of Horticultural Science.

== WW II and food production in the UK ==
In 1939 Wallace organised the Long Ashton section of the Local Defence Volunteer. The section eventually became a Company of the 7th Somerset Home Guard. He was given the rank of major and became second in command of the battalion which grew to a strength of over 3000 men. During WW II the British government sponsored a campaign for increased food production involving large-scale conversion of pasture for grazing animals into land for raising crops. Such conversion sometimes failed, or partially failed, because the soil had mineral composition unfavourable for food crops. When the land to be sloughed up had a soil type which might prove deficient in some minerals, Wallace recommended the use of indicator plots. The plots had several crops selected to display symptoms of mineral deficiencies. Different fertiliser treatments of the three major plant nutrients, nitrogen (N), phosphorus (P), and potassium (K), as well as various combinations of micronutrients, were implemented in the indicator plots for comparison with the control plot (which was fully fertilised with N, P, K, and the micronutrients). For Wallace's method to work, it was necessary to have a comprehensive, illustrated book displaying in colour the various possibilities for mineral deficiencies that might occur in the crops planted in the indicator plots. The required book with photographic images in colour was financed by Agricultural Research Council and printed by H. M. Stationery Office in London. The book was given a high priority and published in 1943 with the title The diagnosis of mineral deficiencies in plants by visual symptoms: a colour atlas and guide. There was a 2nd edition in 1951 and a 3rd edition in 1961. The book became a standard reference with a world-wide demand that continued for decades.

Wallace was a thorough and sophisticated researcher. He and his co-workers sometimes grew plants in sand culture in which the concentration of the element under examination was reduced beyond the limits of detection even by extremely sensitive chemical methods. Such experimental horticulture in sand culture often required great skill and diligence. Many different problems were encountered in practical applications. A necessary plant nutrient might not be absent from the soil but instead chemically bound by unfavourable chemical conditions in such a way that it was not bio-available to the plant. The unfavourable chemical conditions in the soil needed to be dealt with. In such a case, Wallace would conduct a series of field trials on a typically deficient soil using a variety of treatments. He was satisfied only when the intended crop was flourishing where it had previously failed.

== Work overseas ==
In 1926 Wallace toured agricultural and horticultural research institutes and colleges in the United States and Canada. After WW II, there was considerable international demand for his advice on soils, plant nutrition, and fruit production. In 1947, at the invitation of the French Society of Soil Science, he joined soil expeditions in the Montpellier region and in Algeria. In 1948 Johns Hopkins University appointed him to chair a sub-committee that drafted reconmendations which resulted in the establishment of the McCollum-Pratt Institute for the Investigation of Micronutrient Elements. While he was in the United States in 1948, he gave a series of lectures at Cornell University and elsewhere. In 1949 he travelled extensively in Australia and New Zealand to observe different soil types in various climates and to lecture. In 1950 he visited the Netherlands to participate in the International Soil Congress, to lecture, and to visit agricultural research centres and areas of special agricultural importance. In 1951 he went to Spain and lectured in the Universities of Madrid, Zaragossa, Valencia and Granada and, later in the year, went to Rome, where he attended the 2nd International Fertilizer Conference. In 1954 in Paris, he attended the 8th International Botanical Congress. In 1958, at the request of the UK's Colonial Office, he went to Jamaica to chair a scientific team appointed to investigate what research might be needed for the British Caribbean's citrus industry. Two other prominent members of the team were Dr Arthur Forrest Camp, director emeritus of the University of Florida Citrus Experiment Station, and Mr H. R. Hinton of the UK Ministry of Agriculture, Fisheries and Food. After visiting Jamaica, British Honduras, Trinidad, and Florida, the scientific team wrote a report, enabling citrus planters in Jamaica to improve the quality and productivity. Later in 1958, Wallace attended to Madrid to attend the 6th Congress of the International Potash Institute.

== Awards and honours ==
In 1931 Wallace was awarded the D.Sc. by the University of Durham. The Royal Institute of Chemistry elected him in 1918 an Associate and eventually elected him a Fellow. He was appointed in 1946 a corresponding member of the French Academy of Science (Section IX — l'economie rurale) and in 1957 a foreign member of the French Academy of Agriculture. In 1951 he was appointed Honorary Councillor of Spain's Higher Council for Research. The Royal Horticultural Society awarded him the Veitch Memorial Medal and in 1952 the Victoria Medal of Honour. The Worshipful Company of Fruiterers awarded him the Ridley Gold Medal for research in fruit growing. For his work during WW II, Wallace was created in 1947 Commander of the Order of the British Empire. In 1953 he was elected a Fellow of the Royal Society.

== Personal life ==
In 1917 Wallace married Gladys Mary Smith. They had a daughter, Jean, and a son, Alan. Gladys Wallace died in 1936. In 1938 Thomas Wallace married Elsie Stella Smyth, who worked at the Long Ashton Research Station during and after her PhD research. There was one sone, Nigel, from Thomas Wallace's second marriage. Jean Wallace served in WW II in the Royal Naval Volunteer Reserve as a medical officer with the rank of surgeon lieutenant. In December 1946 she married Reginald Arthur Shooter. The Shooters had a son and three daughters. Alan Wallace was wounded in WW II, qualified in medicine, and went to New Zealand as Medical Officer of Health in the District of Taranaki. Eventually Alan Wallace left New Zealand to work for the World Health Organization. On a mission in Africa in 1963, he and his young wife were killed in an aeroplane crash, leaving their two young children as orphans. Thomas and Elsie Wallace took responsibility for Thomas's two orphaned grandchildren.

== Selected publications ==
=== Articles ===
- Mann, C. E. T.; Wallace, T. (1925). "The Effects of Leaching with Cold Water on the Foliage of the Apple". Journal of Pomology and Horticultural Science. 4 (3): 146–161. doi:10.1080/03683621.1925.11513278.
- Wallace, T. (1927). "Leaf Scorch on Fruit Trees". Journal of Pomology and Horticultural Science. 6 (4): 243–281. doi:10.1080/03683621.1927.11513325.
- Bracewell, Mary Forrest; Wallace, Thomas; Zilva, Sylvester Solomon (1931). "The antiscorbutic potency of apples. III". Biochemical Journal. 25 (1): 144–146. doi:10.1042/bj0250144. PMC 1260621. PMID 16744560.
- Wallace, T. (1932). "The Nutrition of Woody Plants (With Special Reference to Cultivated Fruit Plants)". Forestry: An International Journal of Forest Research. 6: 9–26. doi:10.1093/oxfordjournals.forestry.a063272.
- Wallace, T. (1932). "The Effect of Orchard Factors on the Storage Qualities of Fruits". The H.e.a. Year Book. 1: 71–75. JSTOR 45123865.
- Wallace, Thomas; Zilva, Sylvester Solomon (1933). "The antiscorbutic potency of apples. VI". Biochemical Journal. 27 (3): 693–698. doi:10.1042/bj0270693. PMC 1252932. PMID 16745146.
- Wallace, T. (1940). "Magnesium-Deficiency of Fruit Trees". Journal of Pomology and Horticultural Science. 17 (2): 150–166. doi:10.1080/03683621.1940.11513536.
- Wallace, T.; Spinks, G. T. (1941). "A Long Period Field Experiment on the Manuring of Apple Trees". Journal of Pomology and Horticultural Science. 18 (3): 182–192. doi:10.1080/03683621.1941.11513562.
- Wallace, T.; Jones, J. O. (1941). "Boron in Relation to Bitter Pit in Apples". Journal of Pomology and Horticultural Science. 18 (2): 161–176. doi:10.1080/03683621.1941.11513560.
- Wallace, T.; Hewitt, E. J. (1946). "Studies in Iron Deficiency of Crops. I. Problems of Iron Deficiency and the Interrelationships of Mineral Elements in Iron Nutrition". Journal of Pomology and Horticultural Science. 22 (3): 153–161. doi:10.1080/03683621.1946.11513640.
- Wallace, T. (1957). "Trace Elements in Plant Nutrition with Special Reference to Crops". Journal of the Royal Society of Arts. 105 (5004): 515–534. JSTOR 41366086. 1957

=== Books ===
- Wallace, Thomas (1943). The diagnosis of mineral deficiencies in plants by visual symptoms: a colour atlas and guide. London: H. M. Stationery Office. LCCN 44003007; vi+116 pages, including colour plates and tables
  - Wallace, Thomas (1951). The Diagnosis of Mineral Deficiencies in Plants by Visual Symptoms: A Colour Atlas and Guide (2nd ed.). LCCN 52004058; vii+107 pages
  - 3rd edition (3rd ed.). 1961. LCCN 64028816; vii+125 pages
- Wallace, Thomas; Marsh, R. W., eds. (1953). Science and Fruit: Commemorating the Jubilee of the Long Ashton Research Station, 1903–1953. University of Bristol.
- Wallace, Thomas; Martin, John Thomas, eds. (1954). Insecticides and Colonial Agricultural Development. Colston papers, volume 6 . Proceedings of the sixth symposium of the Colston Research Society, held at the University of Bristol, 23–27 March 1953. London: Butterworths Scientific. LCCN 73009227; x+169 pages; illustrated; one paper in French
- Wallace, Thomas; Bush, R. G. W., eds. (1956). Modern Commercial Fruit Growing. Country Life Ltd.
