= Sonoma Botanical Garden =

Botanical garden in California, U.S.

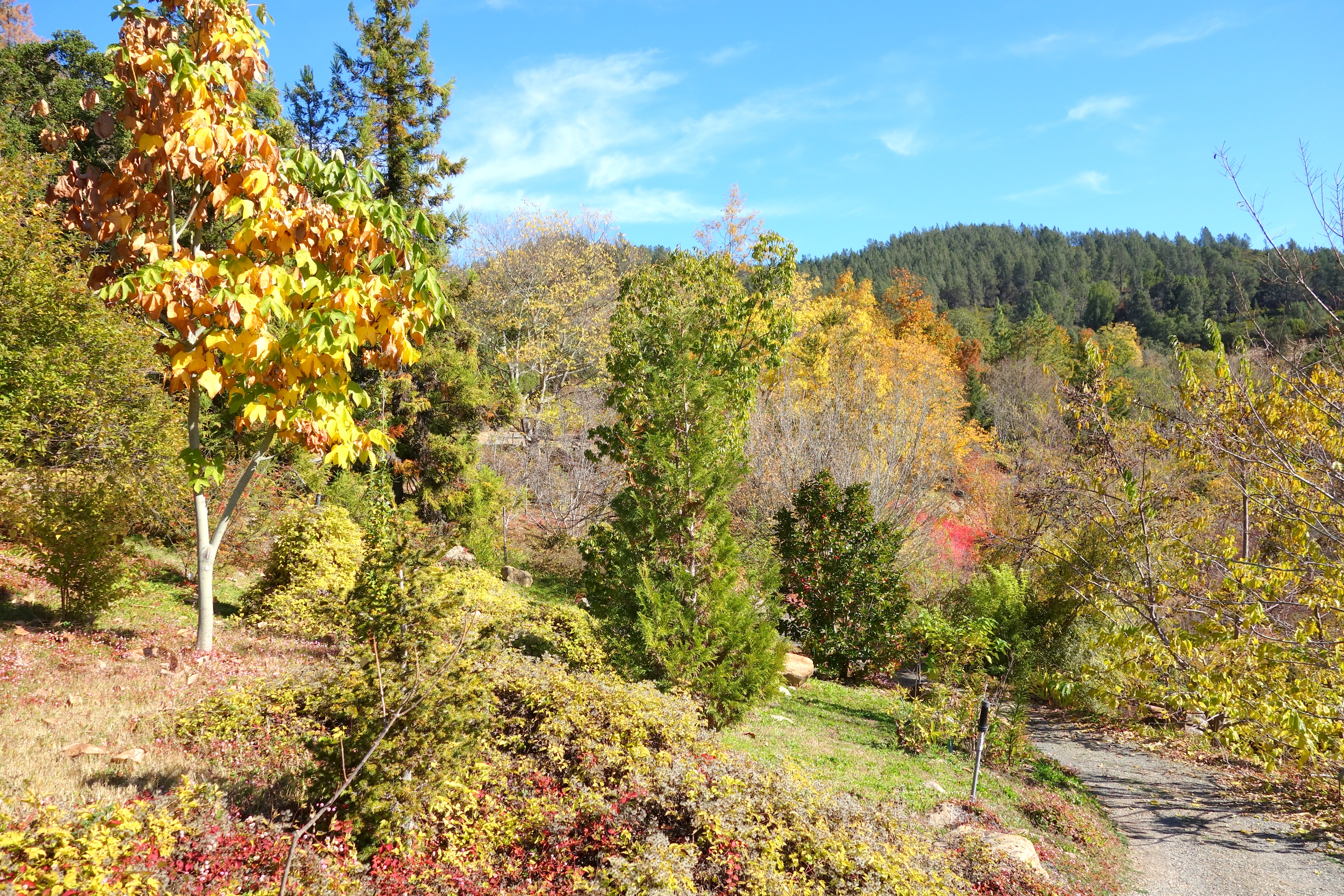
- Sonoma Botanical Garden

- Location within California Location within the United States
- Type: Botanical garden
- Location: Glen Ellen, California, United States
- Coordinates: 38°22′29″N 122°30′51″W
- Area: 61 acres (25 ha)
- Opened: 1968
- Website: sonomabg.org

Sonoma Botanical Garden (formerly Quarryhill Botanical Garden) is a 501(c)(3) private nonprofit education and research botanical garden, home to one of the largest collections of scientifically documented, wild-source Asian plants in North America and Europe.

== History ==
The Sonoma Botanical Garden property was originally a sandstone quarry that previously produced road foundation stone.

In 1964, the Nuns Canyon Fire burned more than 10,000 acres in the Mayacamas Mountains above Glen Ellen, California.

In 1968, San Francisco resident Jane Davenport Jansen purchased forty-plus acres northeast of Glen Ellen for a summer home. In 1970 she planted cabernet vineyards on the valley floor of the property.

In 1982, Jane began to consider the uncultivated parts of the property inspired by a partnership with Roger Warner. After a flood around Jane's house in 1982, Jane was introduced to Roger who redesigned the landscape reminiscent of an English garden with a selection of California native plants and rarities from China. In 1985, a landscape partnership between Jane and Roger was formed and plans for a 25-acre hillside botanical garden began.

In 1987, Jane sponsored the first collecting expedition to Asia. In that year, the relationship between her and Roger Warner suddenly dissolved and Lord Howick of the Howick Arboretum helped Jane refocus her vision for the garden. They planned for a conservation of rare and endangered Asian species.

In 1988, cooperative expeditions with the Royal Botanical Gardens, Kew Gardens, and the Howick Arboretum began. The property was named Quarryhill Botanical Garden and a small nursery was established to cultivate the wild-collected seeds. Planting began in 1990. Preserving these threatened species and celebrating biodiversity was the foundation for the garden's mission.

Jansen appointed William A. McNamara Director in 1994 and he became executive director in 2007. In 1998, an additional 22 acres, Three Springs Ranch, was purchased.

== Seed-collecting expeditions ==
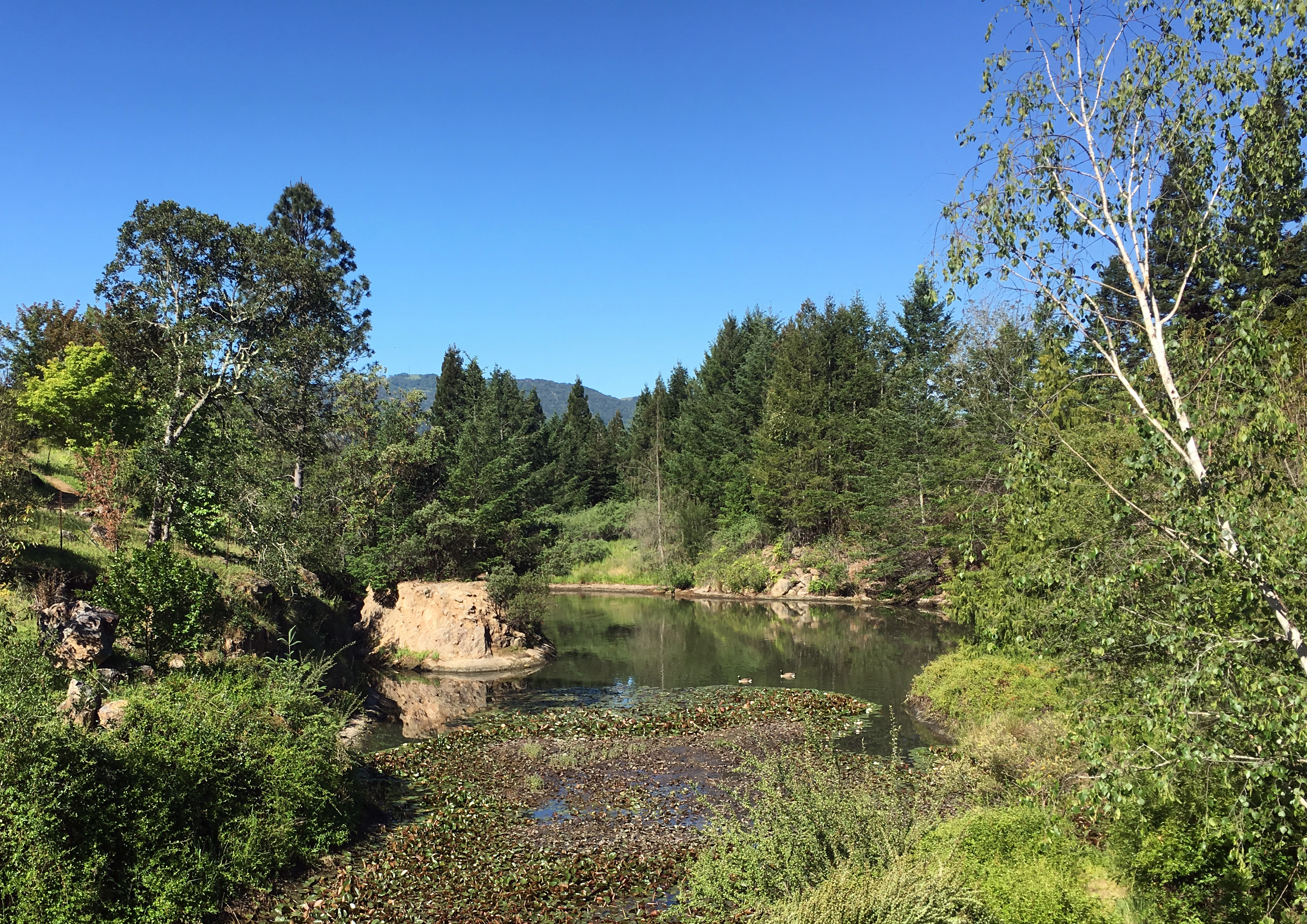
A view looking northeast across the lower pond at Sonoma Botanical Garden, an internationally recognized wild Asian woodland garden in Sonoma Valley

From its founding in 1987 through 2017, staff of the garden went on annual expeditions to collect seeds and herbarium specimens from the following Asian regions: Hubei, Sichuan, Taiwan, Tibet, Yunnan; India - Himachal Pradesh; Japan - Hokkaidō, Honshū, Kyūshū, Shikoku, Yakushima; and Nepal. A few other expeditions collected in North America. The garden has also received wild-collected seed courtesy of Index Seminum publications from Japan, Taiwan and South Korea, as well as Asian seed and plants from North American gardens.

The garden's collection of includes approximately 25,000 wild origin plants, representing over 2,000 individual species. Most of these planting took place annually beginning in 1990. Some of the garden's plants are available for sale in the garden's Gift Shop.

== See also ==
- List of botanical gardens in the United States
