= H. G. H. Kearns =

Professor Howard George Henry (H. G. H.) Kearns
- Born: 13 May 1902; Friern Barnet, London
- Died: July 1986 (aged 84); Sedgemoor, Somerset
- Known for: Entomology
- Spouse: Molly Cousins (m. 1930–1973)

Howard George Henry Kearns, OBE (13 May 1902 in Friern Barnet, London – July 1986 in Sedgemoor, Somerset) was a researcher in entomology whose knowledge of entomology and engineering influenced the design of spraying equipment before and after the Second World War.

He was a long-time researcher at the University of Bristol and the Deputy Director of its Long Ashton Research Station. He was awarded an Honorary Degree (Doctor of Science) by the University of Bath in 1967.

== Bibliography ==
- KEARNS, H.G.H., B.Sc., Ph.D., Dip. Agric., Research Station, Long Ashton, nr ... -
- Hutchinson, H.P. & Kearns, H.G.H. - Insect Pests of Willows - Nature, cxxv, nos 3145 & 3147, pp201 & 276 London, February 1930

Nature, Volume 125, Issue 3147, pp. 276 (1930). - IN a letter in NATURE of Feb. 8, p. 201, by H. P. Hutchinson and myself, a serious error in the proof escaped notice. Galerucella luteola Müll was quoted as a common pest of Salix triandra varieties in Great Britain. The species, of course, should have been G. lineola Fabr. The former Chrysomelid beetle is common on the Continent and is not indigenous to Great Britain. doi:10.1038/125276e0

- Kearns, H.G.H. 1931. The larval and pupal anatomy of Stenomalus micans Ol. (Pteromalidae), a chalcid endo-parasite of the gout-fly of barley (Chlorops taeniopus Meig.) with some details of the life history of the summer generation. Parasitol. 23: 380-95.
- KEARNS, H.G.H. and WALTON C. L. Experiments on the control of the greenhouse centipede (Scutigerelia immaculata) Ann. Rept. Univ. Bristol. Ag. Hort. Res. Sta. 97-101
- KEARNS, H.G.H. (1933). Control of apple sawfly. Fruitgrower, .... AND APPLIED ENTOMOLOGY. J. B. GOODEY. MARY T. FRANKLIN ... -
- KEARNS, H.G.H. 1942 The control of flies in country and town. Ann. Appl. Biol. 29:310-313.
- KEARNS, H.G.H. & MORGAN, N. G., 1951. An experimental "air flow" small volume sprayer and duster. Abridged specification. Rep. agric. hort. Res. Sta. Bristol, 1950: 132-137, 8 figs.
- KEARNS H.G.H., 1953, SCI FRUIT, V217
- KEARNS, H.G.H. 1965

== Personal life ==
Kearns was born on 13 May 1902 in Friern Barnet to Henry Kearns (1871–1937) and his wife Elizabeth Ann (née Baker) (1871–1958)

On 30 August 1930, at Christ Church, Purley, Surrey, he married Molly Yvonne Cousins (25 October 1902 – 1973).

He died in July 1986.

== Obituary ==
1902–1986. "From 1930 to 1970 Howard Kearns' unique symbiosis of entomology and engineering exerted a major influence on the design of spraying equipment and ..."
