= Miles Hadfield =

English writer (1903–1982)

- Born: Miles Heywood Hadfield; 15 October 1903; Handsworth, Staffordshire, England
- Died: 31 March 1982 (aged 78)
- Occupations: Garden writer and journalist
- Notable work: A History of British Gardening (1960)

Miles Heywood Hadfield (15 October 1903 – 31 March 1982) was an English writer on gardening and one of the founders, and the first president, of the Garden History Society. He was awarded the Royal Forestry Society's gold medal and the Royal Horticultural Society's Veitch Memorial Medal.

Hadfield studied engineering before taking a job at Best and Lloyd, who made light fittings, where he worked from 1924 to 1930 locally and in London. He then became a full time writer and illustrator on botanical and forestry topics, producing books such as The Gardener's Companion (1936), Everyman's Wild Flowers and Trees (1938), British Trees: A guide for everyman (1957), and the work he is best known for, A History of British Gardening (1960), which has become the standard work on the subject.

During the Second World War he worked for the Ministry of Food ensuring food supplies in the English Midlands. In later life he became involved with the National Trust, working on the reconstruction of historic gardens such as Westbury Court in Gloucestershire which had fallen into disrepair. The gardens were subsequently grade II* listed with Historic England.

== Early life and family ==
Miles Hadfield was born in Handsworth, Staffordshire (now Birmingham), on 15 October 1903, the oldest son of Heywood George Hadfield (1872–1946), a solicitor, and Hilda Bragg (1876–1959) who was the daughter of the jewellery manufacturer Charles Bayley Bragg (1850–1933). He was schooled at Bradfield College in Berkshire and afterwards enrolled to study engineering at the University of Birmingham in 1921.

The family were prosperous during Miles's youth and lived in Hamstead Mount, a house built by Charles Bragg, but later suffered a financial reverse which necessitated the letting of half the house.

Miles's brother was John Hadfield who later worked as an editor at J. M. Dent who became his publishers.

== Career ==
Hadfield's first job was at Best and Lloyd, a Birmingham firm who made light fittings where he worked from 1924 to 1930 locally and in London. At the same time he became an evening student at the Birmingham School of Art and, after leaving Best and Lloyd, a full time author and artist on botanical, gardening, and forestry subjects. His first book was The Gardener's Companion (1936) which he illustrated himself. This was followed by Everyman's Wild Flowers and Trees in 1938.

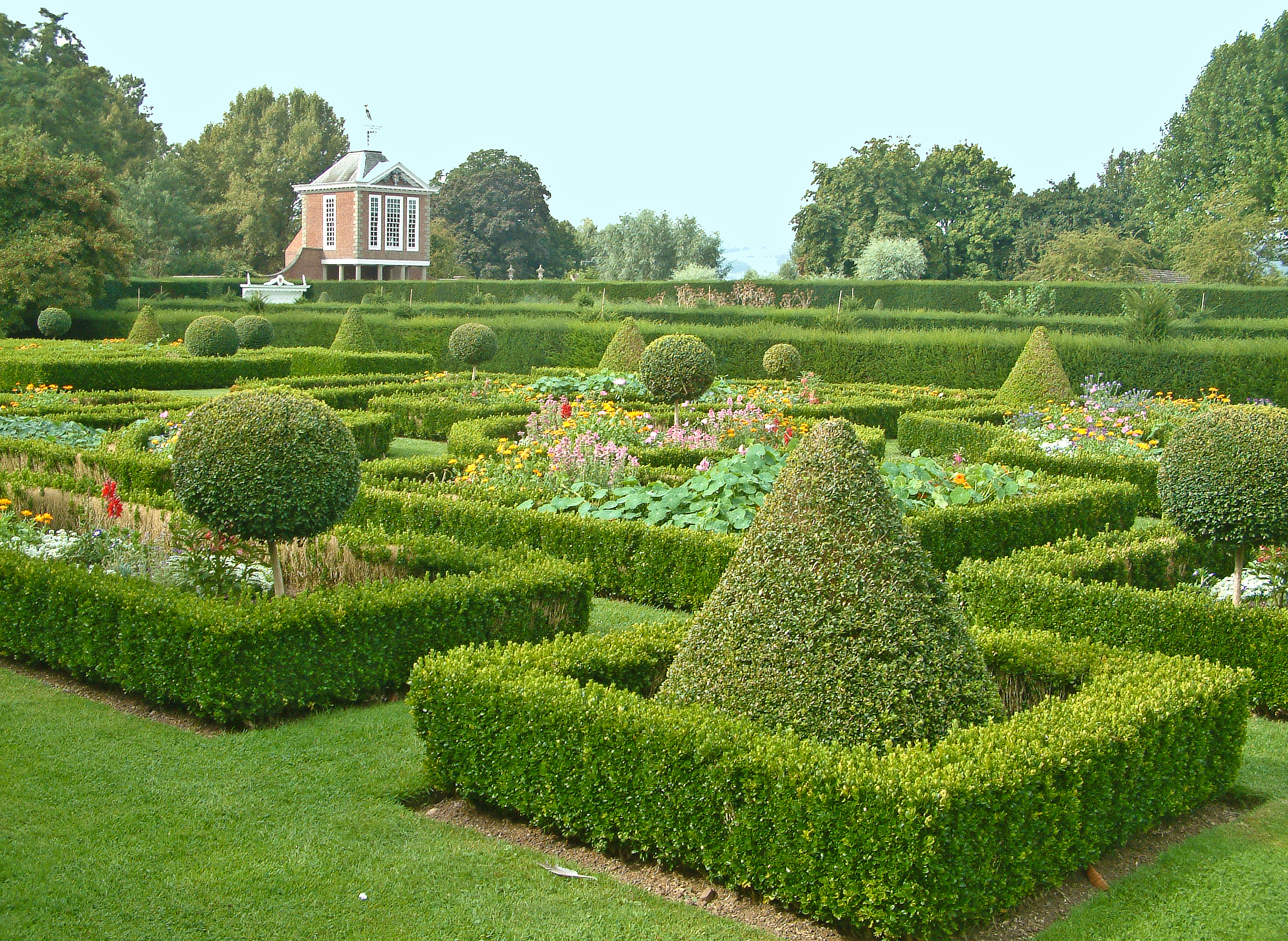
The restored Westbury Court garden

During the Second World War he worked for the Midland Division of the Ministry of Food, rising to the position of deputy controller of food for the Midlands, where he helped to ensure food supplies to the city of Coventry during the Blitz. He resigned in 1949 and returned to garden writing, having articles published in periodicals such as Country Life, The Gardeners' Chronicle, and House and Garden. In 1957 he produced British Trees: A guide for everyman, which he also illustrated, and in 1960 A History of British Gardening which was described by the University of Reading as the standard work on the subject.

In 1966 he was a co-founder of the Garden History Society and its first president. He began to work with the National Trust on the reconstruction of historic gardens such as Westbury Court in Gloucestershire which had fallen into disrepair. The gardens were grade II* listed with Historic England in 1986. He was awarded the Royal Forestry Society's gold medal and in 1962 the Royal Horticultural Society's Veitch Memorial Medal.

== Death and legacy ==
Following the death of his mother, Hamstead Mount was sold, and in 1962 Hadfield moved to Dillon's Orchard, Wellington Heath, near Ledbury in Herefordshire. He married Rachel Hughes in 1975 but the same year suffered a fall and increasingly poor health and eye-sight. He died in 1982. His papers are held in the special collections of the University of Reading and include extensive material relating to Hadfield's friend, the photographer Edward Cahen.

== Selected publications ==
- The Gardener’s Companion. Dent, London, 1936. (Editor and illustrator)
- Everyman’s Wild Flowers and Trees. Dent, London, 1938.
- Pioneers in Gardening. Routledge & Kegan Paul, 1955.
- British Trees: A guide for everyman. Dent, London, 1957. (Illustrated by the author)
- A History of British Gardening. Hutchinson, London, 1960.
- Gardens of Delight. Cassell, London, 1964. (With John Hadfield)
- Landscape With Trees. Country Life, London, 1967. ASIN B0000CNGWP
- A Book of Country Houses. Country Life Books, Feltham, 1969. ISBN 0600430278
