= Chen Hang =

Chinese botanist

Chen Hang (Traditional Chinese: 陳杭; Simplified Chinese: 陈杭) was born in 1931. She is a botanist and horticulturist.

== Career ==
Chen was born in Guangde County, Anhui Province. In 1949, she studied in the Department of Horticulture, Zhejiang University. In 1953, she graduated from the Department of Horticulture, Zhejiang Agricultural College (previous and current Zhejiang University.

Chen has worked in Beijing for a long time. Chen is a main founder of the modern Beijing Vegetable Research Center (BVRC; 北京蔬菜研究中心), and she is the current Director of the center. Chen is the Vice-president and a researcher of the Beijing Agriculture and Forestry Research Institute (北京農林科學院/北京农林科学院). She is also a part-time professor at Zhejiang University.

== Recognition ==
Chen is a director of the Chinese Horticultural Society.

In 1990, Chen was awarded the Veitch Memorial Medal (Gold), by the Royal Horticultural Society (RHS). She is the first Chinese to receive this honour.
