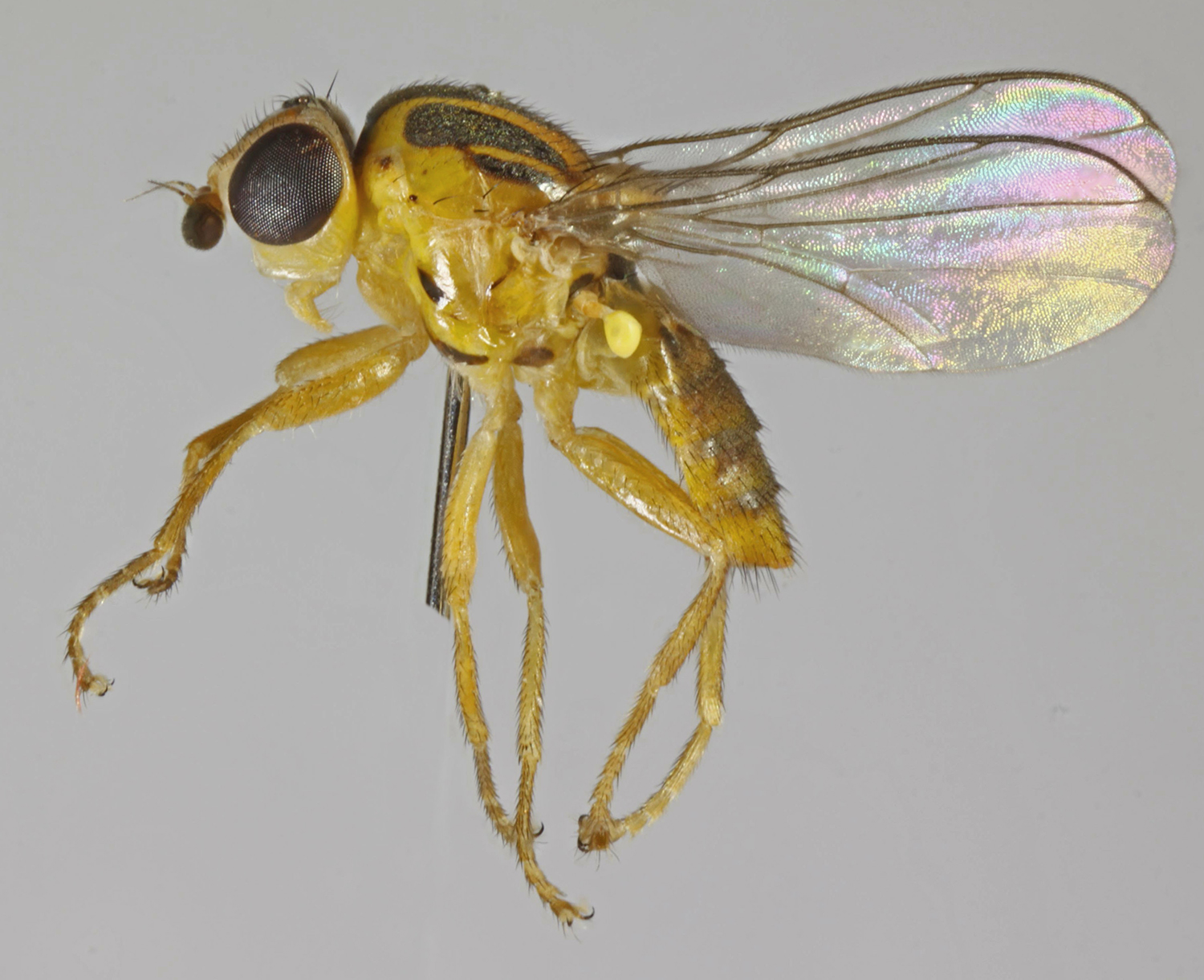
- Chlorops planifrons North Wales

Scientific classification
- Kingdom: Animalia
- Phylum: Arthropoda
- Class: Insecta
- Order: Diptera
- Family: Chloropidae
- Genus: Chlorops
- Species: C. planifrons

Binomial name
- Chlorops planifrons (Loew, 1866)

Synonyms
- Oscinis planifrons Loew, 1866; Oscinis lineola Zetterstedt, 1848; Chlorops triangularis Becker, 1910

= Chlorops planifrons =

Species of fly

Chlorops planifrons is a species of fly in the family Chloropidae. It is found in the Palearctic.
