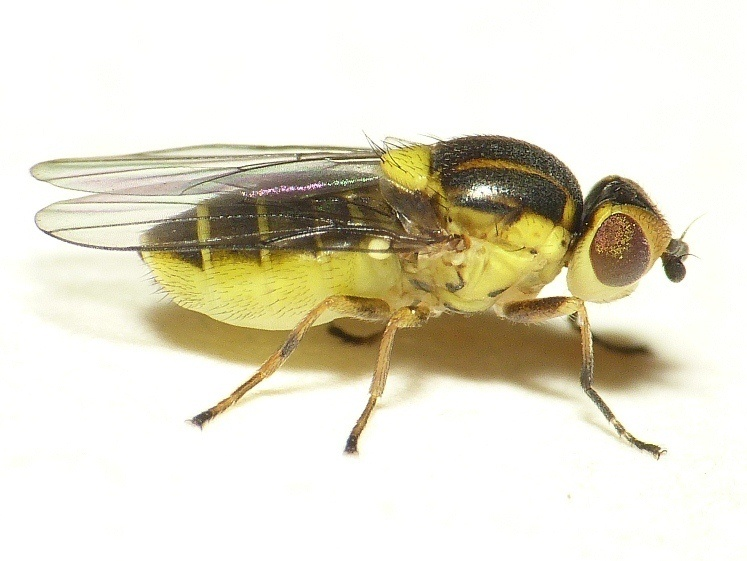
- Chlorops pumilionis from the Netherlands.
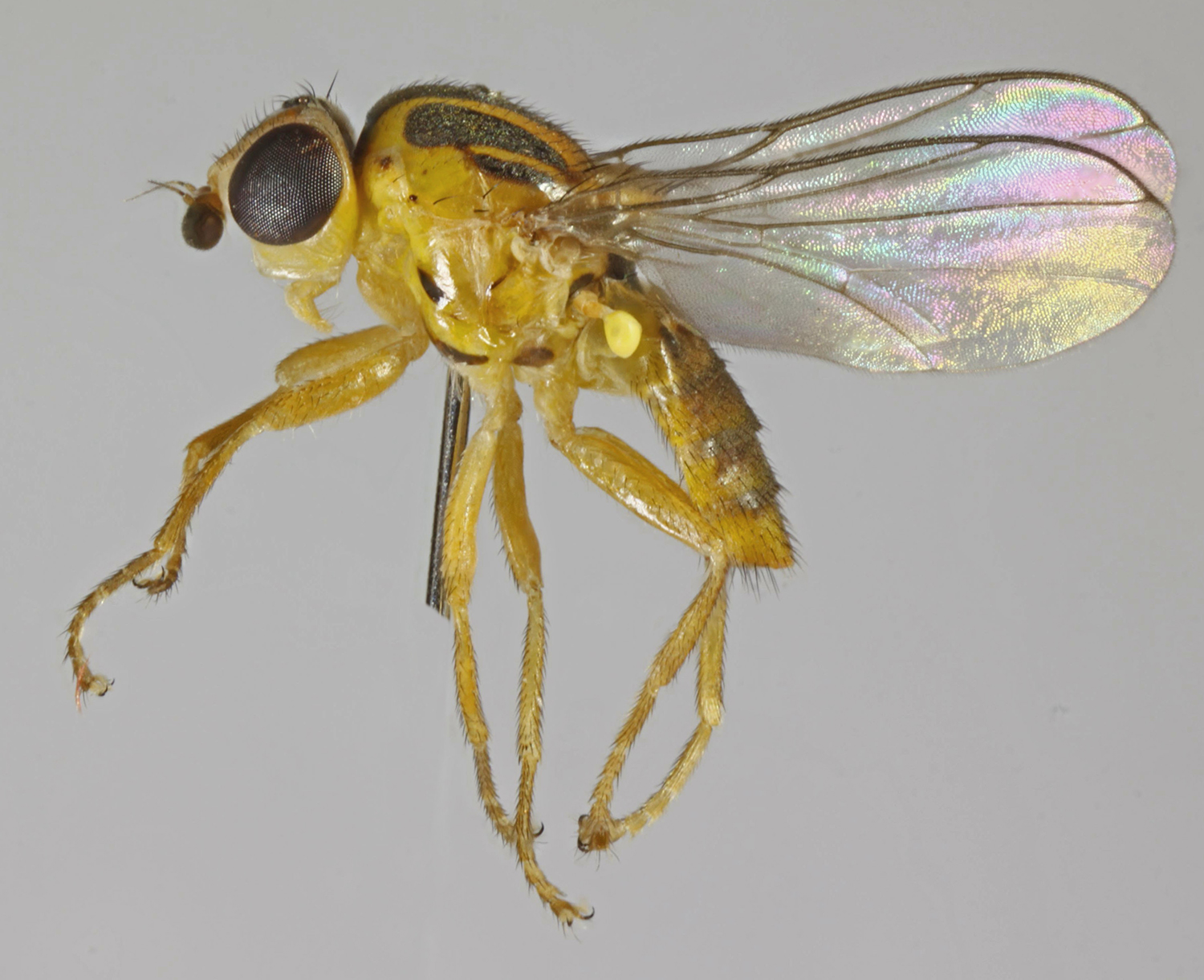
- Chlorops planifrons from North Wales.

Scientific classification
- Kingdom: Animalia
- Phylum: Arthropoda
- Clade: Pancrustacea
- Class: Insecta
- Order: Diptera
- Family: Chloropidae
- Subfamily: Chloropinae
- Genus: Chlorops; Meigen, 1803

Species
- See text

Synonyms
- Anthracophaga Loew, 1866

= Chlorops =

Genus of flies

Chlorops is a genus of fly that belongs to the family Chloropidae (frit flies). They can be found worldwide.

The color pattern of this genus is often very similar to genus Thaumatomyia. They are distinguished from Thaumatomyia with a more convexed scutellum on top that is very flat with a sharp margin. A few species have a distinctive pattern on the top of the head which consists of dark round spots on the front and on a pale background.

== Taxonomy ==
This genus is a dipteran that belongs to the family Chloropidae. More specifically, it is a member of the subfamily Chloropinae.

Chlorops sp. feeding on a common tansy (Tanacetum vulgare) in Burgwald, Hesse, Germany.

The genus was described by Johann Wilhelm Meigen, a German entomologist known for his pioneering work on dipterans.

=== Species ===
This genus contains many species. A list of species can be found below;

- C. adjunctus Becker, 1910
- C. adamsi Sabrosky, 1935
- C. alpicolus Becker, 1910
- C. amabilis Duda, 1933
- C. angustifrons Becker, 1910
- C. annulipes Macquart, 1835
- C. anthracophagoideus Strobl, 1901
- C. atra Macquart, 1851
- C. babosae Dely-Draskovits, 1978
- C. bohemicus Zuska, 1960
- C. brevifrons Loew, 1866
- C. brunnipennis Becker, 1912
- C. calceatus Meigen, 1830
- C. centromaculatus (Duda, 1933)
- C. certima Adams, 1904
- C. cinerapennis Adams, 1903
- C. cinerellus Séguy, 1934
- C. constricta Becker, 1912
- C. crocota Loew, 1863
- C. dasycerus Loew, 1866
- C. declinata (Becker, 1912)
- C. dissimulans (Duda, 1933)
- C. egregia Becker, 1912
- C. emiliae Smirnov, 1967
- C. fasciatus Meigen, 1830
- C. figuratus (Zetterstedt, 1848)
- C. finitimus Becker, 1910
- C. flavipilus Smirnov, 1964
- C. frontosus Meigen, 1830
- C. geminatus Meigen, 1830
- C. genarum Becker, 1912
- C. gracilis Meigen, 1830
- C. hypostigma Meigen, 1830
- C. infumatus (Becker, 1910)
- C. interruptus Meigen, 1830
- C. kirigaminensis Kanmiya, 1978
- C. laccatus Nartshuk, 2002
- C. laetus Meigen, 1830
- C. laevis Becker, 1912
- C. languida Becker, 1912
- C. lasciva Adams, 1904
- C. limbatus Meigen, 1830
- C. liturata Adams, 1903
- C. longipalpis (Duda, 1933)
- C. longulus Meigen, 1838
- C. marchali Mesnil in Balachowki & Mesnil, 1935
- C. meigenii Loew, 1866
- C. melanocera Loew, 1863
- C. nigrimanus Macquart, 1835
- C. nigripalpis (Duda, 1933)
- C. nigroscutellatus (Duda, 1933)
- C. novakii Strobl, 1902
- C. oblita Becker, 1912
- C. obscurellus (Zetterstedt, 1838)
- C. obscuricornis Loew, 1863
- C. oryzae (Matsumura, 1915) Rice stem maggot
- C. pallidiventris (Duda, 1933)
- C. pallifrons Strobl, 1909
- C. palpalis Adams, 1903
- C. palpatus Smirnov, 1959
- C. pannonicus Strobl, 1893
- C. pennatus (Duda, 1933)
- C. perflava Walker, 1849
- C. planifrons (Loew, 1866)
- C. producta Loew, 1863
- C. proximus Say, 1830
- C. pubescens Loew, 1863
- C. pumilionis (Bjerkander, 1778)
- C. puncticornis Loew, 1866
- C. quercophila Beschovski, 1979
- C. rectinervis Becker, 1912
- C. ringens Loew, 1866
- C. riparius Smirnov, 1958
- C. rossicus Smirnov, 1955
- C. rubicunda Adams, 1903
- C. rubrivittata Adams, 1904
- C. rufescens Coquillett, 1910
- C. rufinus (Zetterstedt, 1848)
- C. rufiventris Macquart, 1835
- C. ruginosa Becker, 1912
- C. sabulona Becker, 1912
- C. sahlbergii Loew, 1863
- C. scalaris Meigen, 1830
- C. scutellaris (Zetterstedt, 1838)
- C. seminigra Becker, 1912
- C. serenus Loew, 1866
- C. signatus Dely-Draskovits, 1978
- C. socia Becker, 1912
- C. sordidella Becker, 1912
- C. speciosus Meigen, 1830
- C. stigmata Becker, 1912
- C. stigmaticalis Becker, 1912
- C. strigulus (Fabricius, 1794)
- C. subnigra Coquillett, 1910
- C. sulphurea Loew, 1863
- C. suturalis Séguy, 1934
- C. tarsalis Becker, 1912
- C. tectifrons Becker, 1910
- C. testacea Macquart, 1851
- C. triangularis Becker, 1910
- C. troglodytes (Zetterstedt, 1848)
- C. varsoviensis Becker, 1910
- C. zernyi (Duda, 1933)
