= Hortus =

- Language: Horticulture
- Edited by: David Wheeler (gardener and writer)

Publication details
- History: 1987–present
- Frequency: Quarterly

Standard abbreviations
- ISO 4: Hortus

Indexing
- ISSN: 0950-1657

Links
- Journal homepage

Hortus is a quarterly journal covering gardens and horticulture, privately published in the United Kingdom. The journal was founded in 1987 by David Wheeler.

== See also ==
- List of horticultural magazines
