= Ashley Stephenson (horticulturalist) =

Brirish horticulturalist (1927–2021)

Robert Ashley (Shute) Stevenson (1 September 1927 – 3 February 2021) was a British horticulturalist who worked for the Royal Parks. He was the Bailiff of the Royal Parks from 1980 until 1990.

== Career ==
Stephenson was the first Bailiff of the Royal Parks who did not come from a privileged background. The Bailiff the Royal Parks is responsible for overall management of the royal parks of London, places that are now officially public parks designated by the Crown Lands Act (1851) but which originated as possessions of the monarch. Stephenson and his family lived in an official residence, the Ranger's Lodge in Hyde Park.

After attending Walbottle Secondary School, Stephenson joined the Parks Department of Newcastle-Upon-Tyne Corporation as an apprentice. He completed national service in Palestine and Cyprus within the Royal Army Service Corps and then worked for a private garden and a landscaping company. In 1954 he gained formal qualifications with a Diploma in Horticulture from studying at the Royal Horticultural Society garden in Wisley. From 1954 until retirement in 1990 he worked in The Royal Parks. He was promoted to Superintendent of Central Royal Parks in 1972 and was appointed Bailiff of Royal Parks in 1980. After he retired he was a consultant and also gave lectures on cruises until 2005.

Stephenson was the gardening correspondent of The Times from 1982 until 1987 and wrote a weekly column in The Evening News newspaper under the pen name of Queen's Gardener as well as articles in Amateur Gardening magazines. He also wrote a book, The Garden Planner, published in 1981. He was active in committees of the Royal Horticultural Society and was a judge in flower shows. He was vice chair of London in Bloom in 1984 and also chaired South and South East in Bloom for several years. He was president of the British Pelargonium and Geranium Society from 1983 until 1995.

== Personal life ==
Stephenson was born on 1 September 1927, in Newcastle upon Tyne. His parents were James and Agnes Maud Stephenson. In 1955 he married Isabel Dunn BEM (died 2020) and they had two children together. Stephenson died on 3 February 2021.

== Awards ==
Stephenson was elected a Fellow of the Chartered Institute of Horticulture in 1998, after having been a Member since 1987. He was made a Member of the Royal Victorian Order in 1979 and promoted to a Lieutenant of the Royal Victorian Order in 1990. He was awarded the Veitch Memorial Medal in 1989 by the Royal Horticultural Society.

The Pelargonium x domesticum 'Ashley Stephenson' was named for him.
