= Eric John Hewitt =

British plant physiologist

Eric John Hewitt, FRS (27 February 1919 – 1 January 2002) was a British plant physiologist who pioneered the study of plant nutrition in the 20th century.

He is commonly known for compiling the nutrient recipes for the Long Ashton Nutrient Solution in his landmark book on sand and water culture methods, first published in 1952 and revised in 1966.

Hewitt was educated at Whitgift School, graduated with a first-class BSc in botany and chemistry from King's College London, and completed his PhD at the University of Bristol in 1948. Hewitt's laboratory at Long Ashton Research Station opened in 1956. He was a Reader in Plant Physiology at the University of Bristol from 1967 to 1984.

He was made a Fellow of the Royal Society in 1982.
