= Nellie Roberts =

British botanical artist

- Born: Nellie Roberts; 15 October 1872
- Died: 29 March 1959 (aged 86)
- Resting place: Lambeth Cemetery, Blackshaw Road, Tooting, London
- Known for: orchid painting
- Awards: Veitch Memorial Medal; 1953

Nellie Roberts (or Nelly Roberts) (15 October 1872 – 29 March 1959) was an English botanical and scientific illustrator.

Roberts was brought up in Brixton, London and lived there throughout her life. Her father was a watchmaker and she lived and did most of her painting above what was originally his shop in Loughborough Road.

She was the first and longest serving Royal Horticultural Society (RHS) orchid artist. Roberts was employed from 1897 until 1953 to paint life-sized illustrations of orchids that had gained RHS awards. These built a reference collection of images of cultivars and hybrids for the Society that are held within the RHS Lindley Library. She also made duplicates for use by the owner of the orchid. She was also commissioned to provide some illustrations required by the Manchester and North of England Orchid Society. She is estimated to have made at least 4500 illustrations of orchids.

She was awarded the RHS Gold medal in 1900 and a silver Veitch Memorial Medal in 1954 for the quality of her art.

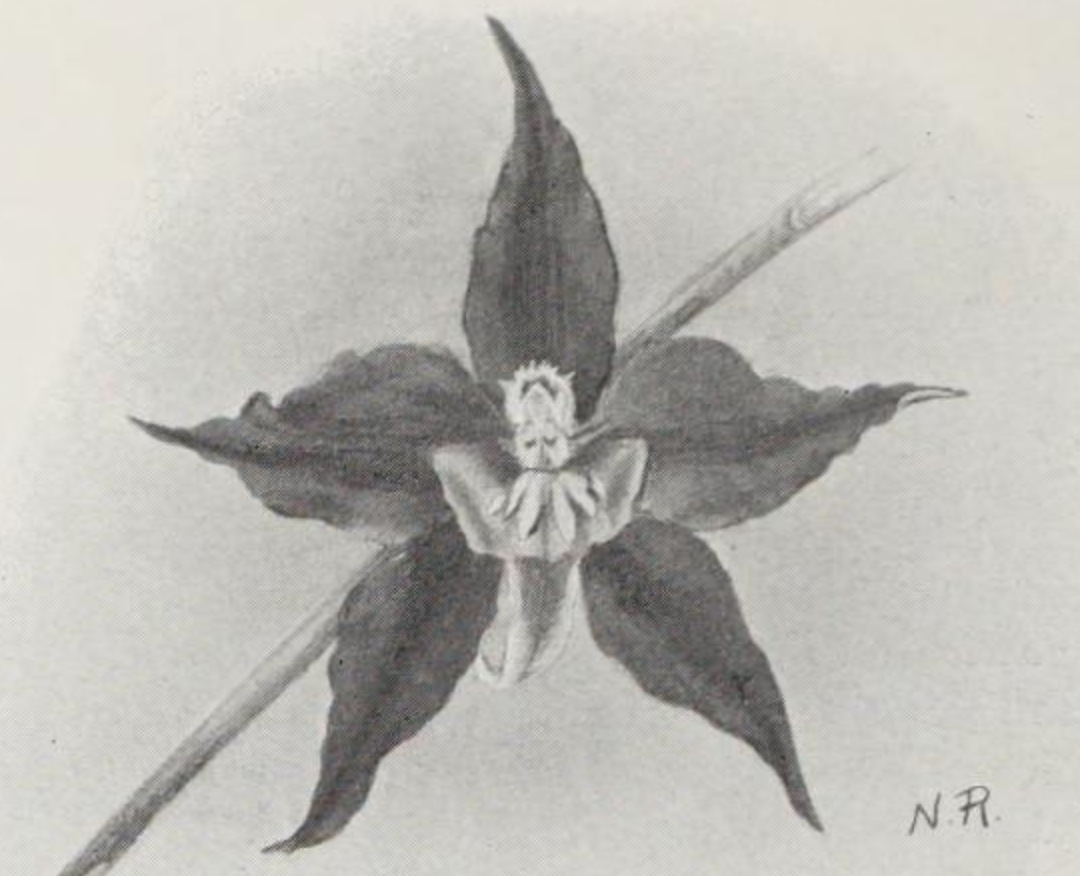
Odonlioda keighleyensis Fowler's var. by Nellie Roberts

Two orchid cultivars were named after her, Cattleya 'Nellie Roberts' (registered 1953) and Odontoglossum opheron ‘Nelly Roberts’ (RHS award-winner, 1952). There is a painting by her of the latter because it was an award-winner.

She was buried in 1959 in an unmarked shared grave in Lambeth Cemetery in Tooting, London.
