= Jean O'Neill =

English plantswoman and horticulturalist

The Right Honourable The Lady O'Neill of the Maine
- Born: Katharine Jean Whitaker; 16 January 1915; 41 Brook Street, Mayfair, London, England
- Died: 15 July 2008 (aged 93); Hampshire, England

Jean O'Neill, Baroness O'Neill of the Maine (16 January 1915 – 15 July 2008) was an English plantswoman and horticulturalist.

== Early life and family ==
Jean O'Neill was born Katharine Jean Whitaker at 41 Brook Street, Mayfair, London on 16 January 1915. Her parents were William Ingham Whitaker and Hilda Guilhermina (née Dundas). Her father was a landowner and horticulturalist of Pylewell Park, near Lymington, Hampshire. Her maternal grandfather was the Scottish peer, Charles Dundas, 6th Viscount Melville. She had four siblings, and grew up at the family estate Pylewell Park, which had extensive gardens which had been developed by her father and grandfather. Interested in botany from a young age, O'Neill would follow her father and head gardener when they selected new specimens. She was educated at home alongside her older sisters. She was more interested in gardening and outdoor activities than the London social life, but she travelled to Europe with fellow debutante and friend, Anne Hamilton-Grace, first to Hungary, and then the Balkans by taking an old Ford V8 car from England. O'Neill visited her friend, Unity Mitford, in Munich but was horrified by Mitford's Nazi sympathies. She joined the Voluntary Aid Detachment during World War II, nursing the wounded in Grimsby and then the Royal Naval Hospital at Gosport, Hampshire.

She was acquainted with Terence O'Neill for a number of years, and while he was serving with the Irish Guards, they married on 4 February 1944 in the Guards' Chapel in Wellington Barracks, London. He was wounded in September 1944, and was evacuated from the Netherlands to Pylewell Park, remaining there until the end of the war. In 1946, the couple moved to a former rectory outside Ahoghill, County Antrim, Glebe House.

== Life in Northern Ireland ==
O'Neill was a loyal supporter of her husband's political career in Northern Ireland, from his first election to Stormont as an MP in 1946 to his time as Northern Ireland prime minister from 1963 to 1969. She accompanied him on visits to Great Britain, Europe and the United States. During the first official visit of a Northern Ireland prime minister to France in 1966, O'Neill stood in for her husband to make a speech at an official banquet when he was recalled to Belfast due to an emergency.

She dedicated most of her time to her children, Patrick and Penelope, and to creating a five-acre garden at her home, as well as volunteering with local societies and horticultural groups. She served as chair of the Ballymena Horticultural Society, and was the first president of the Rose Society of Northern Ireland from 1968 to 1975. While chair of the National Trust gardens committee, she made large contributions to the effort to restore the trust's garden at Rowallane, County Down and the development of more trust gardens in Ulster. From 1964, she was a judge of the International Rose Trials in Belfast. She wrote articles for numerous journals, including Country Life and The Journal of Garden History, on garden plants and historical gardens. For Recreating the period garden (1984) edited by Graham Thomas, O'Neill wrote a 27-page article on plants, and she also contributed to the Oxford companion to gardens (1986). Her opus was the posthumously published Peter Collinson and the eighteenth-century natural history exchange (2008), a history of the Quaker merchant, Peter Collinson based on 30 years of research by O'Neill.

== Later life in Hampshire ==
After her husband was pushed out of office in April 1969, and due to the increasing hostility in Northern Ireland, the O'Neills returned to Lymington, to Lisle Court in the grounds of Pylewell Park. Here O'Neill developed another garden of note, famed internationally for its southern hemisphere trees and shrubs. She was involved in the creation of a historically accurate garden based on 17th century planting at Compton Garden, at St Cross Hospital, Winchester while serving as vice-president of the Hampshire Gardens Trust in 1968. Throughout the 1980s, O'Neill made a number of trips to the United States, lecturing on plant and garden history. She accompanied Ghillean Prance on a plant collecting trip to the Amazon river at age 88. When visiting her son in Australia, she took arduous, long walks in the Australian bush to collect seeds and specimens. O'Neill was a fellow of the Linnean Society, and served as vice-president of the Garden History Society. She was awarded the Royal Horticultural Society's Veitch Memorial Medal in 2000 in recognition of her contribution to horticultural science and practice.

After the death of her husband in 1990, she was burgled several times with one burglar so impressed by her bravery he apologised to her and alerted the police on her behalf. She died on 15 July 2008 in Hampshire following a stroke.
