= Pan Britannica Industries =

Pan Britannica Industries Ltd
- Industry: Chemical
- Founded: Tennant Group of Companies
- Fate: Acquired
- Headquarters: Waltham Abbey, United Kingdom
- Key people: Dr David Gerald Hessayon
- Products: Kylage, Baby Bio, Slug Pellets
- Website: PBI Home & Garden Ltd

Pan Britannica Industries Ltd (PBI) was a household and agrochemical formulation company incorporated in 1932 and based at Britannica House, Sewardstone Road, Waltham Abbey and with a distribution presence in Wisbech in Cambridgeshire. PBI was, in common with many other UK household names, both a manufacturer and marketing organisation for both agricultural and horticultural products.

PBI produced many agro-chemical formulations for farmers, however it was perhaps best known for its product Baby Bio, a liquid plant food that came in a small perfume-shaped bottle. PBI was also the original publisher of the 'Expert' range of gardening books, starting with Be Your Own Gardening Expert written in 1958 by Dr D.G. Hessayon, who later became the company's chairman.

The company was sold to Sumitomo Corporation on 28 September 1990, and rebranded as PBI Home & Garden in 1998. In March 1999 the company was acquired by global conglomerate Bayer. The building on the former PBI (Pan Britannica Industries) site in Sewardstone Road, Waltham Abbey, burned down in the early hours of Thursday, 28 June 2001.The company has ceased production at Waltham Abbey, the works have been demolished and the site redeveloped for a Tesco supermarket which opened on Thursday 7th July, 2005. The rebranded company, PBI Home and Garden, was dissolved in 2015.

== Cancer allegations ==
The company's formulation plant in Waltham Abbey was alleged to be at the centre and therefore the cause of a cancer hotspot. This was highlighted by Storyline, an investigative television programme by Carlton Television, in early 1993. Reports of an unusual occurrence of cancer around the plant and subsequent legal action taken by the residents were the basis for this programme.
