= Keshab Chandra Pradhan =

Indian politician (1948–2021)

Keshab Chandra Pradhan (October 1948) also known as K.C. Pradhan is an Indian forester and a bureaucrat. He was the Chief Secretary of Sikkim. He was third Asian to win Veitch Memorial Medal of the Royal Horticulture Society (RHS) of the United Kingdom for his contribution in floriculture.
