= Veitch Memorial Medal =

Prize issued by the Royal Horticultural Society

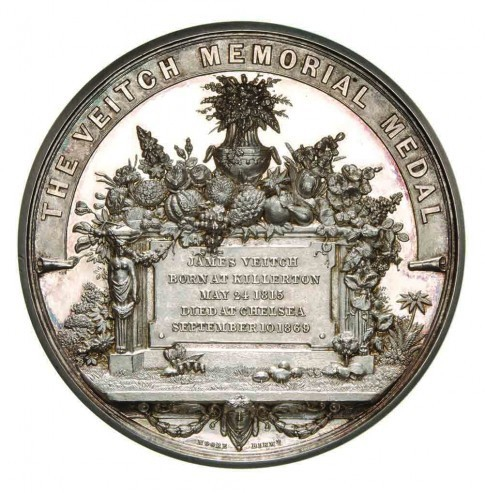
Veitch Memorial Medal

The Veitch Memorial Medal is an international prize awarded annually by the Royal Horticultural Society (RHS).

== Goal ==
The prize is awarded to "persons of any nationality who have made an outstanding contribution to the advancement and improvement of the science and practice of horticulture".

== History ==
The prize was first planned in 1870, in memory of James Veitch of Chelsea. At first, the prize was issued by the Veitch Memorial Trust and awarded at local horticultural shows, but from 1885 the Medals were awarded at the Orchid Conference. Since 1922, the Royal Horticultural Society (RHS), having taken over the Trust, has awarded the Medal. By 2010 over 500 medals had been presented.

== Winners ==
=== 19th and 20th centuries ===
- 1883: John Roberts (1830–1892) (Head Gardener, Charleville Castle, Co. Offaly, Ireland).
- 1886: Andy Dey
- 1887: A. Ives (Gardener to E.C. Jukes)
- 1891: John Heal (c. 1841 – 1925), William Watson (Assistant Curator - Royal Botanical Gardens, Kew)
- 1894: Victor Lemoine (France) (1823–1911), George Nicholson (1847–1908).
- 1895: Donald McBean (1843–1903)(Scotland) Director Scottish Horticultural Society, Director Glasgow and West of Scotland Horticultural Society, obit. Gardeners' Chronicle 16 May 1903, p. 318.
- 1896: Charles Sprague Sargent (1841–1927) (US)
- 1897: Liberty Hyde Bailey (1858–1954) (US)
- 1899: Thomas Francis Rivers (1831–1899)
- 1901: Richard Irwin Lynch (1850–1924) Curator of the Cambridge University Botanic Garden, Thomas Meehan (1826–1901) (1826–1901) (US)
- 1904: Lucien Louis Daniel (France)
- 1906: Ernest Henry Wilson (1876–1930)
- 1907: John Gilbert Baker (1834–1920); Worthington George Smith (1835–1917)
- 1913: Sir Trevor Lawrence, 2nd Baronet (1831 – 1913)
- 1921: Robert Lloyd Praeger (1865–1953) (Ireland)
- 1922: William Jackson Bean (1863–1947)
- 1923: Richard Irwin Lynch (1850–1924), Curator of the Cambridge University Botanic Garden (second award)
- 1924: William Rickatson Dykes (1877–1925); John Hoog Lilian Snelling 1879–1972)(silver medal)
- 1925: David Prain (1857–1944)
- 1926: George Herbert Engleheart (1851–1936); Matilda Smith (1854–1926) (silver medal)
- 1927: George Forrest (1873–1932)
- 1928: Gertrude Jekyll (1843–1932)
- 1929: Alfred Barton Rendle (1865–1938)
- 1930: William Wright Smith (1875–1956)
- 1931: Otto Stapf (1857–1933)
- 1932: Leonard Cockayne (1855–1934); Sir Fredrick William Moore (1857–1950)
- 1933: Arthur Grove
- 1934: Francis Kingdon-Ward (1885–1958)
- 1935: Sir Edward James Salisbury (1886–1978) (of Radlett); Arthur Disbrowe Cotton
- 1936: Robert L Harrow; Arthur William Hill (1875–1941)
- 1937: John Hutchinson (1884–1972), George Russell (1857–1951)
- 1938: Morley Benjamin Crane (1890–1983)
- 1939: Isabella Preston (1881–1965)
- 1941: Eleanor Malby
- 1945: William Henry Judd (1888–1946) (of Arnold Arboretum)
- 1947: Frederick Chittenden
- 1948: Collingwood Ingram (1880–1981); George Sherriff (1898–1967)
- 1949: Amos Perry
- 1950: Wilfrid Jasper Walter Blunt (1901–1987)
- 1951: John Macqueen Cowan
- 1952: Bertie Thomas Percival Barker
- 1953: William Bertram Turrill (1890–1961) (of Kew), Nellie Roberts (silver medal)
- 1954: Dorothy Renton (of Branklyn), Mary Knox-Finlay (of Keillour Castle)
- 1955: Vita Sackville-West (1892–1962), Ralph Peer (1892–1960)
- 1956: Albert Burkwood (1890–1978)
- 1957: Charles Henry Curtis (1870–1958); Patrick Synge (1884–1967); Harold Hillier (1905–1985)
- 1960: Frederick Claude Stern (1874–1967)
- 1961: T. Johnson
- 1962: Frank Reinelt; Miles Hadfield (1903–1982)
- 1963: Percy Cane (1881–1976); Frederick Augustus Secrett (1886–1964); Sir Eric Humphrey Savill (1895–1980)
- 1964: Frances Perry (1907–1993), William Thomas Stearn (1911–2001) Christiaan de Wet Meiring (1900–1976 Caledon Botanical Gardens, South Africa)
- 1965: William Douglas Cook (New Zealand) (1884–1967), A. Nisbet (Silver medal)
- 1966: Graham Stuart Thomas (1909–2003), Eben Gowrie Waterhouse (1881–1977), John Scott Lennox Gilmour (of Cambridge University Botanic Garden), Leonard Broadbent (1916–2002)
- 1967: Alex J Burnett, Elizabeth Hess (Principal of Studley College)
- 1968: John Stuart Yeates (New Zealand) (1900–1986), Maurice Mason (1912–1991)
- 1969: Sir Thomas Neame (1885–1973), Donald Wyman (1904–1993)
- 1970: Mary Pope (Flower arranger)
- 1971: B.L.Burtt (1913–2008), Frances Perry, Helen Richardson (Daffodil breeder); W. Bishop, T. Durrant, A. Westall (silver medal)
- 1972: Xenia Field (1894–1998), Roy Lancaster (born 1938); Mrs T. Rochford; E. Smith (silver medal)
- 1973: Countess of Haddington
- 1974: John Bergmans (Netherlands) (1892–1980); R. Fiske
- 1975: J. Fraser Thomas Robert Noel Lothian (1915–2004)
- 1976: Alice Margaret Coats (1905–1978); Margaret Stones (silver medal)
- 1977: Iris Bannochie (1914–1988); A. Gray
- 1978: Gavin Brown (1910–1987); Frederick Alkmund Roach (1909–2004), Barbara Fry
- 1979: Fred Whitsey (1919–2009); Gordon Rowley, J.W. Goodwin (of Pukeiti Gardens); S. Coe
- 1980: A. Healey, F. Keenan, S. Orr (silver medal), F. Potter, Robert John Garner
- 1981: David Robinson (1928–2004), F. Cleary, David McClintock
- 1982: P. Teunissen
- 1983: P.B.J. Joubert (South Africa)
- 1984: JRP van Hoey Smith (1921–2010), Mary Grierson (1912–2012), R. Beaumont
- 1985: Mavis Batey (1921–2013); K. Andrew, N. Luitse, C. Mitchelmore, Margaret Stones
- 1986: Ambrose Congreve (1907–2011), R. Sagarik
- 1987: Rachel Lambert Mellon (1910–1914); K. Beckett, Victor Fowler; R. Mellon
- 1988: E. Napier, L. Pemberton; T. Wright
- 1989: John Alfred Codrington (1898–1991) Helen Robinson (1919–2004), J. Glazebrook, E. Scholtz, Ashley Stephenson Carl Ferris Miller (1921–2002)
- 1990: Chen Hang (born c. 1931), M. Arai, Elizabeth Scholtz
- 1991: John L. Creech (1920–2009), Lawrence James Metcalf (1928–2017)
- 1992: Patrice Fustier (French), D. G. Hessayon (born 1928), Olive Hilliard, Joy Larkcom, J. Ravenscroft
- 1993: Brent Elliot, Sir Peter Smithers, Brenda Hyatt, H. Suzuki
- 1994: David C.H. Austin, R. Birchall, A. Kenrick, Dick van Gelderen, T. Venison, Wang Dajun
- 1995: Gilly Drummond, Mikinori Ogisu, A. Paterson, Jane Pepper (1945-), B. Self
- 1996: Gloria D. Barretto (1916-), B. Howard, H. Noblett, C. Riley, S. Spongberg, D. Steed, Michael Upward (–2015), R. Waite
- 1997: Ray Bilton (1937–2012); B. Briggs, Brian Rittershausen; Kiat Tan
- 1998: Bruce Macdonald (Missouri Botanical Garden); R. Aylett; J. Bleasdale; Peter Catt; K. Cockshull; R. Elliot; E. Hetherington, M. Rix
- 1999: Sonja Bernadotte (1944–2008); Helen Dillon (1938-); Christopher Grey-Wilson; P. Hemsley; Hugh Johnson; James H. McColl; J. Quinlan, Brian and Maurice Woodfield
- 2000: William Flemer, F. Last; Anna Pavord; Daphne Vince-Prue; Jean O'Neill
- Date unknown: Alfred Daniel Hall (1864–1942)
- Date unknown: Thomas Wallace (1891–1965)
- Date unknown: Werner Rauh (1913–2000)
- Date unknown: Alan Bloom (1906–2005)
- Date unknown: George Hermon Slade AM (1910–2002) (Australian orchid collector)

=== 21st century ===
(See the Royal Horticultural Society Green Manual for further reference.)

- 2001: Francis Higginson Cabot (1925–2011) (US/Canadian), Brian Duncan, Silviero Sansavini (Italy), P. Thoday
- 2002: Piet Oudolf (born 1944) (Dutch), Stella Ross-Craig (1906–2006), B. Machin, John Massey, G. Ogden, Martin Rickard, Lady Emma Tennant, R. Williams
- 2003: Martin John Bukovac, Richard Bisgrove, J. Dowle, J. Moorby, Peter Raven (US), Shirley Sherwood, Vicompte Philippe de Spoelberch (Belgian)
- 2005 :
  - Anne-Marie Evans (A leading figure in botanical illustration, her worldwide influence has led a resurgence of interest in and greater understanding of the depiction of plants)
  - W.H. Frederick, M. Solomon, Sir Richard Storey (1937-), Timothy Whiteley
- 2006: Phillip Cribb, Otto Eisenhut, Aljos Farjon, A. Langton, Norman Looney
- 2007: Rex Dibley, Daniel John Hinkley (born 1953), Lord Charles Howick
- 2008
  - Dr James B. Beard for his lifelong contribution to the development and application of scientific principles to turfgrass culture. Dr Beard founded the International Sports Turf Institute and has served the international horticultural community for the past 50 years through research, teaching and leadership.
  - John Nelson for his outstanding practical work over many years in the restoration of the Lost Gardens of Heligan, one of Cornwall's best-known tourist attractions.
- 2009
  - David Wheeler (founder and editor of Hortus: A Gardening Journal)
  - Dr Joan Morgan (writer and historian)
  - Jozef van Assche (Secretary ISHS)
- 2010: Stefan Buczacki, Bob Brown, Arabella Lennox-Boyd, Haruhiko Nagata, Jennifer Owen
- 2011: Graham Ross (Australia), Christopher Bailes (U.K.), Rosemary Alexander (U.K.), Keshab Chandra Pradhan (Sikkim, India)
- 2012: Susyn Andrews (U.K.), John Elliott (Singapore), Chris Lane (U.K.), Hugh McAllister (U.K.), Beverley McConnell
- 2013
  - Peter Del Tredici, Peter Furniss, Sue Minter, Alec Pridgeon and Margaret Owen
  - Dr Keith Hammett, New Zealander whose horticultural interests include Sweet Peas, Dahlias and Clivias
- 2014: Mark Chase, Martin Gardner, Antonio de Almeida Monteiro, Philip Baulk and Gianfranco Giustina (Italy)
- 2015: Gillian Barlow, Bob Berry, Neil Bragg, Fergus Garrett, Charles Nelson, Penny Snell and John Pilbeam
- 2016: Sarah Carey, Diana Grenfell, Ernst van Jaarsveld (of Kirstenbosch National Botanical Garden), Marco Polo Stufano and Dr Ken Thompson.
- 2017: Dominic Cole, Rod Leeds, Philippe Lecoufle, William McNamara and Andrew McIndoe
- 2018: Prof Rosemary Collier, Gerald Edwards, Michael Hudson and Dr Douglas Needham.
- 2019: Ursula Drioli, Fabio Garbari, John Tan Jiew Hoe and Rachel Lever
- 2020: John Anderson, Owen Johnson, Rosie Peddle, Derek Spicer and Ian Young
- 2021: Junonia Colley, John Hughes, Phil Lusby and Long Yayi
- 2022: James Alexander-Sinclair, Dr Matthew Jebb, Harri Lorenzi, Paul Meyer and Thomas Pakenham
- 2025: Charlotte Allender, Arit Anderson, Tony Avent, Koen Camelbeke, Catherine Dawson, and Maïté Delmas
- 2026: Kevin Belcher, Dr Gary Firth, Andrew Gaunt, Lynden Miller, Roger Parsons, Abraham Rammeloo

== See also ==
- List of agriculture awards
