= David Wheeler (gardener and writer) =

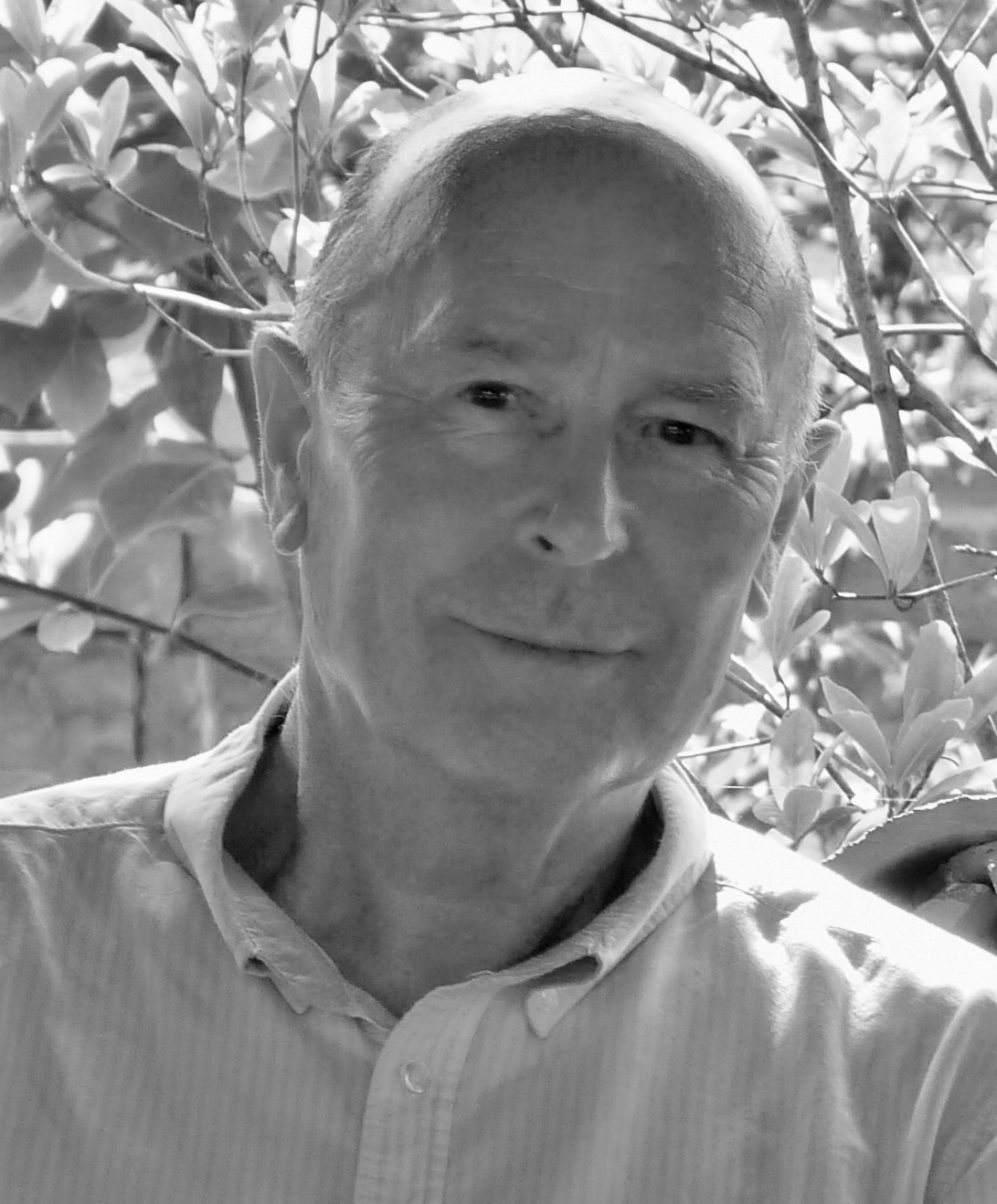
- Born: 1945
- Occupation(s): Gardener, writer and journalist
- Known for: Hortus
- Awards: Veitch Memorial Medal
- Website: www.hortus.co.uk

David Wheeler (1945) is a British gardener, writer and journalist. He founded the literary gardening quarterly Hortus in 1987 and continues as its editor. In 2009 the Royal Horticultural Society awarded him their Gold Veitch Memorial Medal.

== Life and career ==
Wheeler was born in the Cotswolds and lived there until the age of 11, when the family moved to his mother's home town on the Hampshire coast. With an early interest in plants and gardens, he bought Amateur Gardening and Popular Gardening, "concealing them the best I could - boys in the late Fifties and swinging Sixties didn't buy gardening magazines," he told the Oldie.

During the 1960s and 1970s, Wheeler worked as an advertising executive at Southern Evening Echo, Observer, and The Spectator. From 1979 to 1982 he was campaigns director at the RSPCA, before moving into freelance gardening.

In 1987, Wheeler founded the gardening quarterly Hortus. Marking its 25 years in 2012, the Washington Post wrote, "Hortus is the size of a slim paperback but printed on heavy, ivory colored stock and illustrated with line drawings and wood engravings... It produces tactile and aesthetic pleasures once taken for granted and now made acute by their rarity. Wheeler has a motto that Hortus 'is for gardeners who read and readers who garden'." With more than 2,000 subscribers, it has been listed by The Telegraph as one of the best gardening magazines to read.

In 1993, Wheeler founded the quarterly Convivium: The Journal of Good Eating (dedicated to the memory of his friend the food writer Elizabeth David CBE), sharing the same production values as Hortus. It ran for just two years – all eight issues now being highly sought-after collector's items.

Wheeler and his partner, Simon Dorrell, moved to Bryan's Ground, an Arts and Crafts house near Presteigne, Powys, where they created an extensive garden featuring yew and box topiary, formal parterres, canals, wisteria-garlanded terraces and several buildings and follies created by Simon. It has been described as one of the 10 best secret gardens in Britain by Country Life. The Telegraph described it as 'an Edwardian idyll,' while the BBC Gardens Illustrated called it an "idyllic, quintessentially English garden".

In 2009 the Royal Horticultural Society awarded him their coveted Gold Veitch Memorial Medal in recognition of services given in the advancement of science and practice of horticulture.

Wheeler contributes frequently to several other British and foreign newspapers and periodicals. He now lives and gardens near the sea in Carmarthenshire and takes a special interest in hydrangeas, Iris sibirica, Japanese maples, auriculas and clematis.

== Publications ==
- By Pen & by Spade: An Anthology of Garden Writing from Hortus, published by Summit Books, 1990
- The Generous Garden: A Second Anthology of Garden Writing from Hortus, published by A. Sutton, 1991
- Panoramas of English Gardens, published by Little, Brown, 1991
- Over the Hills from Broadway: Images of Cotswold Gardens, illustrated by Simon Dorrell, published by Alan Sutton, 1991
- The Penguin Book of Garden Writing, published by Viking, 1996
- Glyndebourne: A Garden for All Seasons, illustrated by Simon Dorrell, published by Bryansground Press, 2000
- Hortus Revisited: A Twenty-first Birthday Anthology, published by Frances Lincoln, 2008
