= Long Ashton Research Station =

Former agricultural research centre in Somerset

Coordinates: 51.4262°N 2.6688°W

Long Ashton Research Station (LARS) was an agricultural and horticultural government-funded research centre located in the village of Long Ashton near Bristol, UK. It was created in 1903 to study and improve the West Country cider industry and became part of the University of Bristol in 1912. Later, it expanded into fruit research (particularly apples, pears, plums, strawberries and blackcurrants) and in the 1980s was redirected to work on arable crops and aspects of botany. It closed in 2003.

The Research Station is commonly known for developing Ribena, a still-popular vitamin C-rich drink that was widely distributed in the UK during the Second World War, and eventually for the development of the Long Ashton Nutrient Solution.

== History ==
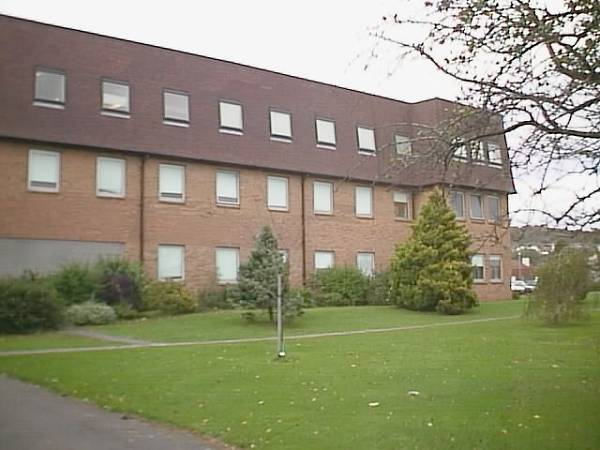
The Hirst Laboratory at Long Ashton

Research on cider making began privately in 1893 at Robert Neville-Grenville's farm near Glastonbury. Prompted by a letter from Frederick James Lloyd (1852–1923), the Board of Agriculture sponsored a conference held at Bristol on 15 October 1902 in order to create an institute for research in fruit growing, fruit utilisation, and making cider and perry. The conference was presided over by Sir Thomas Elliott, 1st Baronet and was attended by representatives from more than ten counties. This led to the formation of the National Fruit and Cider Institute in 1903 in fields south of the main road through Long Ashton. Frederick J. Lloyd was appointed Director. His successor was B. T. P. Barker, who was the director from 1905 to 1943.

In 1912 the Institute became the University of Bristol's Department of Agricultural and Horticultural Research and its name was changed to Long Ashton Research Station. Indeed, the Universities of Bath and Bristol ran Master of Science (MSc) courses at the research station for many years. The first purpose-built laboratory, the Barker Laboratory, was ready for use in 1914.

Fenswood Farm on the north side of the road was bought by the university in 1920 to extend the space available for experiments, and in 1921 the Campden Research Station was taken under Long Ashton's management.

The British Government formed the Agricultural Research Council (ARC) in 1931 and this body was given a direct role in managing LARS. During World War II a home grown source of Vitamin C was needed and the blackcurrant drink Ribena was developed at Long Ashton. A new Biology Laboratory was completed in 1948 and in 1952, although links with Campden Research Station ended, the ARC Unit of Plant Nutrition was set up at Long Ashton.

The Station's 50th year was celebrated by the publication of a book, Science and Fruit, edited by Thomas Wallace and Ralph Warren Marsh. At LARS, Wallace was the deputy director from 1923 to 1943 and the director from 1943 to 1957. Marsh was a research mycologist at LARS from 1926 to 1965. The 1950s were a time of rapid expansion for Long Ashton with the opening of the Kearns and Hewitt Laboratories (1956) and the Wallace Laboratory, Refectory and Conference Room (1959). The first Long Ashton International Symposium was held in 1967.

1981 saw the disbandment of two of Long Ashton's major research divisions, the Pomology and Plant Breeding Division and the Food and Beverage Division. This action by the ARC was a severe blow to the Research Station and began a long period of structural change. The Hirst Laboratory was built in 1983 as part of the reorganisation process, and work on arable crops substantially replaced Long Ashton's long history of work on fruit and cider.

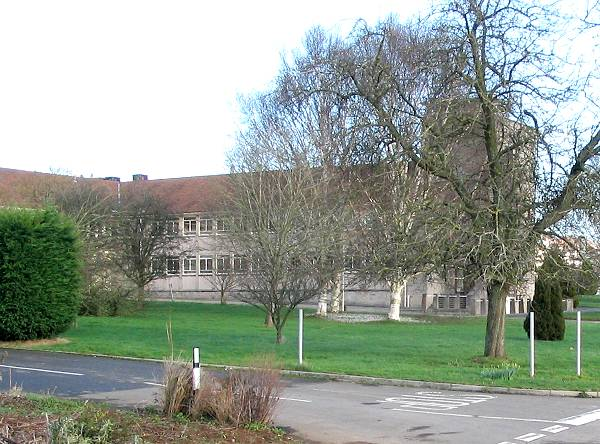
The Wallace Laboratory at Long Ashton, following closure of the site

The Agricultural and Food Research Council (AFRC, previously ARC) closed other research sites including the Letcombe Laboratory (1985) and the Weed Research Organisation (1986) and their staff and programmes were moved to Long Ashton. With Rothamsted it became part of the Institute of Arable Crops Research (IACR) in 1986. Although the new Treharne Library and Fryer Laboratory were built in 1987, as a junior partner in IACR, Long Ashton was now vulnerable in the event of further restructuring.

The Biotechnology and Biological Sciences Research Council (BBSRC, formed from the previous AFRC in 1994) announced in 1999 that Long Ashton was to be closed. The seventeenth and final Long Ashton International Symposium took place in 2002 and the Research Station was duly closed in 2003 having served agriculture and horticulture for exactly 100 years. Some of the remaining staff were moved to Rothamsted during Long Ashton's final years, providing some continuity with the programmes of work under way prior to closure. The site was sold and subsequently redeveloped for housing, employment space, community uses and playing fields.

== Nutrient solution ==
The Long Ashton Nutrient Solution (LANS) was derived from nutrient solutions used at Long Ashton to grow fruit trees. It was first published in 1952 by Eric John Hewitt. The standard LANS concentrations in ppm for almost all essential elements and sodium in a full solution of the nitrate-type are shown below:

- N 168 ppm
- K 156 ppm
- Ca 160 ppm
- P 41 ppm
- S 48 ppm
- Na 31 ppm
- Mg 36 ppm
- B 0.54 ppm
- Mn 0.55 ppm
- Zn 0.065 ppm
- Cu 0.064 ppm
- Mo 0.048 ppm
- Fe 5.6 ppm* or 2.8 ppm**

In particular, the composition and concentration of the micronutrients (B, Mn, Zn, Cu, and Mo) is still commonly used in plant science today (cf. Table (1)).

=== Micronutrients ===
Table (1) to prepare the stock solutions of micronutrients and a full micronutrient solution of LANS

Component	Quantities in solution		
Component	g/L	mL/L	μmol/L
H_{3}BO_{3}	3.09	1	50.0
MnSO_{4}•4H_{2}O	2.23	1	10.0
ZnSO_{4}•7H_{2}O	0.29	1	1.0
CuSO_{4}•5H_{2}O	0.25	1	1.0
Na_{2}MoO_{4}•2H_{2}O	0.12	1	0.5

The micronutrient salts such as MnSO_{4}•4H_{2}O (cf. Table (1)) can be modified with an equivalent amount of MnCl_{2}•4H_{2}O because chloride is one of the elements essential for plant growth. For optimal plant growth, the LANS micronutrients can be combined with the macronutrients of the Hoagland solution. According to Hewitt iron is plant-available as ferric citrate* or may be supplied as ferric EDTA complex** according to Jacobsen.

The Long Ashton or Hewitt solution is widely used and is considered to be suitable for supporting normal growth of a range of different plant species. Hewitt's and Hoagland's solution formulations led to increased growth of nursery fig trees in high-tunnel and open-field conditions, respectively.

Numerous current research papers on plant nutrition use these standard feeding recipes to grow plants, and frequently without explicit description of the recipes.

== Long Ashton International Symposia ==
This series of international conferences was well respected and attended by scientists from every continent.

- 1967 – Recent aspects of nitrogen metabolism in plants
- 1969 – Physiology of tree crops
- 1971 – Fungal pathogenicity
- 1973 – Lactic acid bacteria in beverages and food
- 1975 – Environmental effects on crop physiology
- 1977 – Nitrogen assimilation of plants
- 1979 – Quality in stored and processed vegetables and fruit
- 1982 – Improving vegetatively propagated crops
- 1984 – Rational pesticide use
- 1986 – Hormone action in plant development — a critical appraisal
- 1989 – Herbicide resistance in weeds and crops
- 1991 – Transport and receptor proteins of plant membranes: molecular structure and function
- 1993 – Ecology and integrated farming systems
- 1995 – Plant roots — from cells to systems
- 1997 – Understanding pathosystems: a focus on Septoria
- 1999 – Biotechnology of cereals: tools, targets and triumphs
- 2002 – New frontiers in plant development: from genes to phenotype

== Notable former staff ==
- Bertie Thomas Percival Barker – director, horticultural scientist
- Eric John Hewitt – plant physiologist
- John Pilkington Hudson – director, horticultural scientist
- Howard George Henry Kearns – deputy director
- Lawrence Ogilvie – plant pathologist
- Arthur Frederick Parker-Rhodes – plant pathologist
- Ralph Louis Wain – agricultural chemist

== See also ==
- Agricultural experiment station
