= Rosemary Collier =

British entomologist and applied ecologist

Professor Rosemary Collier OBE FRES
- Scientific career
- Institutions: University of Warwick

Rosemary Helen Collier is a British entomologist and applied ecologist. In 2019 she became professor at the University of Warwick.

== Education and career ==
Collier did a BSc in Zoology, a MSc in Applied Entomology and a PhD looking at a group pest caterpillars, the cutworms. In 2010 she was appointed Director of Warwick Crop Centre and in 2019 she was appointed Professor at the University of Warwick.

In 2011 Collier received the Marsh Horticultural Science Award from the Marsh Christian Trust in recognition of her undertaking important research in the field of horticulture. Collier was awarded the Royal Horticultural Society's Veitch Memorial Medal in 2018 for outstanding contribution to advancing the science and practice of horticulture.

== Research ==
Collier's research looks a new techniques to control insect pest insects of horticultural crops, in particular the use of integrated pest management.

Her work has looked at how to deter pest insects away from food crops to prevent them feeding and causing economic damage, such as such as by providing green areas near the crop on which for them to land, by companion planting with flowering plants such as clover to draw insects away from brassicas, or by applying volatile compounds to change the scent profiles of food crops.

She contributes to the Agriculture and Horticulture Development Board's pest bulletin, which updates growers around the UK with forecasts and alerts for insect pest species of fruit and vegetables. She also provides advice on how weather can affect pest insect populations and how it can influence insect behaviour.
