= James B. Beard =

American agronomist

James B Beard (September 24, 1935 – May 14, 2018) was an American agronomist.

Born in Piqua, Ohio to James Hart and Margaret Bashore Beard, James B Beard was raised in Bradford, Ohio. He attended Ohio State University, graduating with a in Agronomy in 1957 and completed graduate education at Purdue University. He began teaching at Michigan State University in 1961, and joined the Texas A&M University faculty in 1975. Over the course of his career, Beard was named a fellow of the Crop Science Society of America, American Society of Agronomy and the American Association for the Advancement of Science. He retired in 1992, and left his writings to Michigan State's Turfgrass Information Center in 2003. The next year, Purdue granted Beard an honorary doctorate in agriculture. In 2009, Beard received the Veitch Memorial Medal awarded by the Royal Horticultural Society, followed by the Crop Science Society of America Presidential Award in 2014. Beard died in Bryan, Texas, on May 14, 2018, aged 82.
