= Margaret Owen (actress) =

American burlesque actress

Margaret Owen was a burlesque actress who unwittingly became a decoy in the murder of Detroit, Michigan radio personality Jerry Buckley, on July 23, 1930. She made a phone call to Buckley which she believed was to invite him to a party at the La Salle Hotel in Detroit, following a recall election, which ousted Detroit mayor Charles Bowles. Instead, Buckley, a crusading political reporter, was gunned down in the hotel lobby by three assailants following Owen's 1:30 A.M. call. Buckley was an avid critic of Bowles and his life had been threatened earlier.

== Grand jury witness ==
Owen was subpoenaed as a witness before a twenty-two man grand jury, which investigated the Buckley slaying. She was hospitalized on November 29, 1930, after she collapsed in a theater where she was performing. Owen was suspected of drinking liquor which was thought to have been poisoned. She claimed her drink had been poisoned by Dominick Ferro, who had handed it to her.

This was two days before Owen was scheduled to testify at the trial of Nicholas Dollabonta and Frank Salimone for the murder of two Grosse Pointe Park policemen. Owen was placed in a psychiatric ward when she was diagnosed with hysteria, which it was believed she had long suffered from.

== Indictment ==
The jury indicted Ted Pizzino, Joseph Bommarito, and Angelo Livecchi for Buckley's murder. They were exonerated after the jury heard testimony for thirty-four days and deliberated for thirty-three hours. Although Livecchi and Pizzino were quickly arrested for other crimes, the question remained of who killed Jerry Buckley and for what reason.
