= Margaret Owen (plantswoman) =

English farmer and gardener (1930–2014)

Margaret Owen MBE
- Showing her collection in 2013 in "Extraordinary Shropshire"
- Born: Margaret McAllister Mackay; 27 November 1930; Lea Farm, Watford
- Died: 24 October 2014 (aged 83)
- Occupations: Farmer, gardener
- Known for: collections of plants: Camassia, Dictamnus, Galanthus, Nerine, Veratrum
- Spouse(s): Godfrey Owen, (m. 9 October 1952, d. 1983)
- Children: 4
- Awards: Veitch Memorial Medal (2013)

Margaret McAllister Owen MBE (née Mackay; 27 November 1930 – 24 October 2014) was a British farmer, gardener and heritage activist.

== Snowdrops ==
She collected, grew, arranged and exhibited plants, especially snowdrops, holding an annual snowdrop party in her Shropshire garden, The Patch, each year in February. A snowdrop, Galanthus elwesii Margaret Owen was named after her. She herself named a snowdrop after her husband, Galanthus elwesii Godfrey Owen. This has two sets of six petals – inner and outer. This has made it especially popular, and it has been propagated by twin-scaling to make it widely available.

== National Collection ==
She was the holder of four types of plant for the National Collection: Camassia, Dictamnus, Nerine and Veratrum. She bred new colour forms of camassias and pioneered nerines as a hardy plant in the UK. She was awarded the Veitch Memorial Medal in 2013.

== Shrewsbury heritage ==
Owen campaigned to save Rowley's House museum in Shrewsbury. She also founded The Corbet Bed Embroiders Trust to create period hangings for the sixteenth-century Corbet Bed. In 2010, she was awarded the honour of Most Excellent Order of the British Empire MBE, rewarding contributions to the arts and sciences.
