= D. G. Hessayon =

English author and botanist (1928–2025)

D. G. Hessayon OBE
- Born: David Gerald Hessayon; 13 February 1928; Manchester, England
- Died: 16 January 2025 (aged 96); Essex, England
- Education: Leeds University; University of Manchester
- Occupations: Author, botanist
- Known for: "Expert Guides"
- Spouse: Joan Parker Gray (died 2001)
- Children: 2

David Gerald Hessayon OBE (13 February 1928 – 16 January 2025) was an English author and botanist who is known for a best-selling series of paperback gardening manuals known as the "Expert Guides" under his title Dr. D. G. Hessayon. The series started in 1958 with Be Your Own Gardening Expert and in 2008 it celebrated its 50th anniversary and the 50 millionth copy in print. They have become the best selling gardening books in history.

== Background ==
Hessayon was the son of a Cypriot landowner, was born on 13 February 1928, and grew up in Salford, Lancashire, England. He gained a Bachelor of Science degree in botany from Leeds University. In 1950, he travelled to the United States where he worked as the editor of a small-town newspaper. In 1953, he went to the Gold Coast as a Research Fellow at the University College before returning to Manchester to obtain his doctorate in soil ecology. In 1955, he accepted a position as chief scientist with Pan Britannica Industries Ltd (PBI), becoming chairman in 1972. It was whilst working for PBI that Hessayon formulated the idea for his "Expert" guides to gardening.

Hessayon and his wife, novelist Joan Parker Gray Hessayson (d. 2001), had two daughters. He lived in Essex, and died at a nearby hospital on 16 January 2025, at the age of 96.

== The "Expert" guides ==
A steady stream of publications followed the initial Be Your Own Gardening Expert, each maintaining the basic formula of down-to-earth writing broken up into short sections with headers, and illustrated with what were at the time lavish numbers of colour photographs, graphic images and charts. In later editions the Be Your Own ...Expert titles were changed to The ... Expert. On the British bestsellers list for the 1980s, two Experts were in the Top 10. There are (as of 2009) over 20 "Expert" titles in 22 languages and in Britain their sales continue to dominate the gardening paperback lists. The Vegetable & Herb Expert continues to be the best seller.

Nobody has improved on the formula for getting facts on the page in the most immediately intelligible manner

— Brent Elliott, Librarian, Royal Horticultural Society, 1997,

== Recognition ==
In 1993, Hessayon received the first-ever Lifetime Achievement award at the British Book Awards. He was also awarded the Veitch Memorial Medal of the Royal Horticultural Society in 1992 for his contribution to the advancement and improvement of the science and practice of horticulture. In 1999, he was awarded a Guinness World Records certificate for being Britain's "bestselling non-fiction author of the 1990s".

Despite a resolve to stay out of the limelight, Hessayon received further awards, including a Lifetime Achievement Award from the Garden Media Guild, and three honorary doctorates. In the 2007 New Year Honours, he was appointed an Officer of the Order of the British Empire (OBE) for services to gardening and to charity.

== Bibliography ==
From 1959, Hessayon wrote many books.

Other books by the author
Title	Year published	ISBN
Potato Growers Handbook (with P G Fenemore)	1961	
Silage Makers' Handbook (with Christopher Hugh Wood)	1962	
The Garden Book of Europe	1973	ISBN 0241023866
The Armchair Book of the Garden	1983	ISBN 0712602348
The Bio Friendly Gardening Guide	1990	ISBN 0903505339
The Bedside Book of the Garden	2008	ISBN 9780903505697

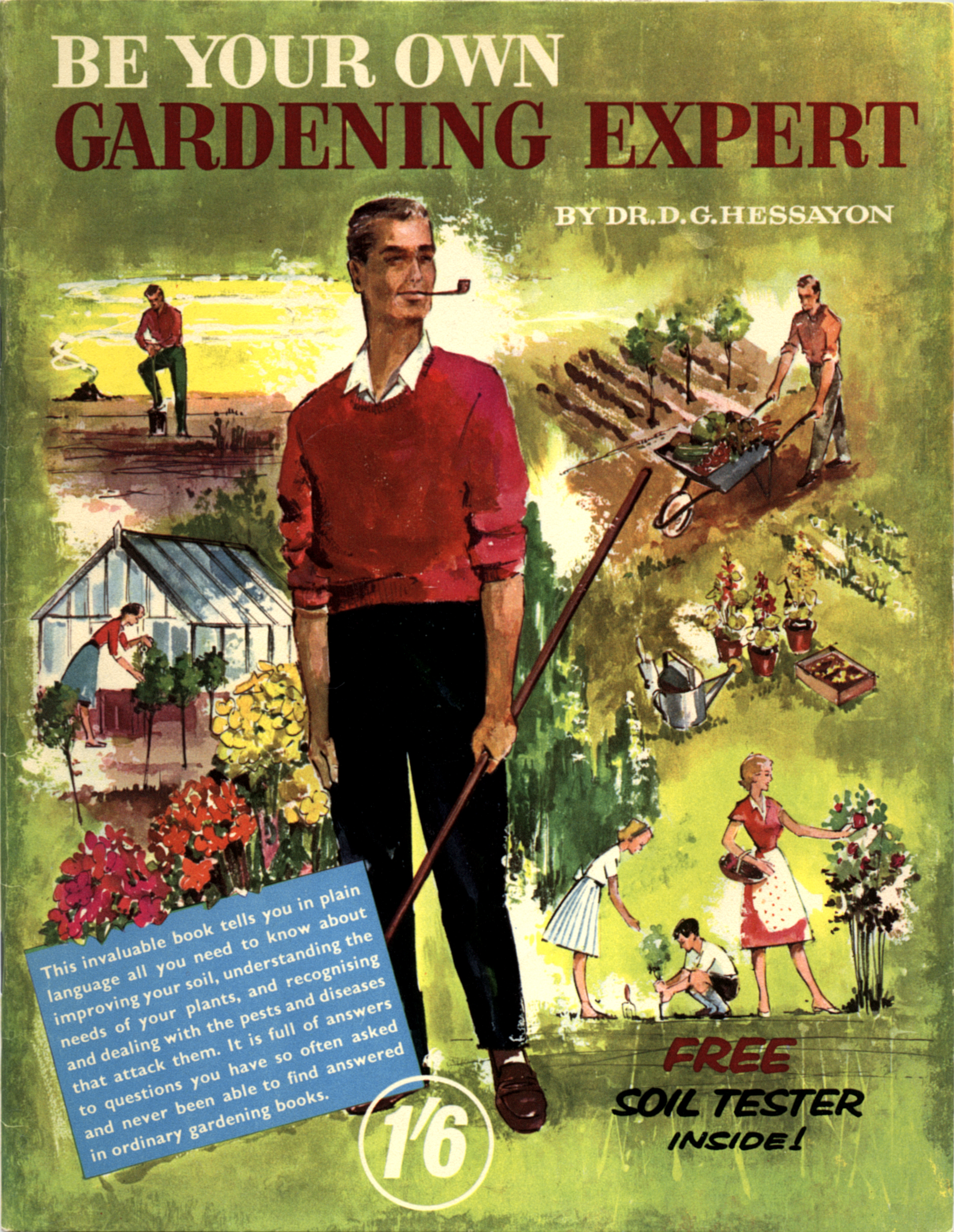
Cover of 1959 Be your own Gardening Expert

Expert series of books
Title	Year published	ISBN
Be your own Gardening Expert	1959	
Be your own Gardening Expert (republished)	1961	
Be your own Gardening Expert	1959	
Be your own Gardening Expert (republished)	1961	
Be your own House Plant Expert	1961	
Be your own House Plant Expert (revised)	1967	
Be your own Lawn Expert	1961	
Be your own Lawn Expert (revised)	1968	
Be your own Rose Expert (with Harry Wheatcroft)	1965	
Vegetable Plotter	1976	ISBN 0903505061
Be your own House Plant Spotter (with J. P. Hessayon)	1977	ISBN 090350507X
Be your own Vegetable Doctor	1978	ISBN 0903505088
Be your own Garden Doctor	1978	ISBN 0903505096
The House Plant Expert	1980	ISBN 0903505134
The Rose Expert	1981	ISBN 0903505142
The Cereal Disease Expert	1982	ISBN 0903505169
The Lawn Expert	1982	ISBN 0903505150
The Lawn Expert (reprinted)	1988	ISBN 0903505150
The Lawn Expert (reprinted)	1990	ISBN 0903505150
The Tree & Shrub Expert	1983	ISBN 0903505177
The Tree & Shrub Expert (reprinted)	1992	ISBN 0903505177
The Tree & Shrub Expert (reprinted)	1994	ISBN 0903505177
The Tree & Shrub Expert (reprinted)	2012	ISBN 9780903505178
The Flower Expert	1984	ISBN 0903505193
The Flower Expert (reprinted)	1994	ISBN 0903505193
The Indoor Plant Spotter	1985	ISBN 0903505215
The Garden Expert	1986	ISBN 0903505223
The Garden Expert (reprinted)	1997	ISBN 0903505223
The Gold-Plated House Plant Expert	1987	ISBN 0712616985
The Home Expert	1987	ISBN 090350524X
Rose Jotter	1989	ISBN 0903505274
Vegetable Jotter	1989	ISBN 0903505282
Be your own Greenhouse Expert	1990	ISBN 0903505320
The Bedding Plant Expert	1991	ISBN 0903505347
The Bedding Plant Expert (reprinted)	1995	ISBN 0903505347
The New House Plant Expert	1991	ISBN 0903505355
The Vegetable Expert	1985	ISBN 0903505207
The Vegetable Expert (reprinted)	1993	ISBN 0903505207
The Garden DIY Expert	1992	ISBN 0903505371
The Rock & Water Garden Expert	1993	ISBN 090350538X
The Flower Arranging Expert	1994	ISBN 090350541X
The Flowering Shrub Expert	1994	ISBN 0903505398
The Greenhouse Expert	1994	ISBN 0903505401
The Bulb Expert	1995	ISBN 0903505428
The Container Expert	1995	ISBN 0903505436
The Container Expert (reprinted)	1998	ISBN 0903505436
The Easy-care Garden Expert	1996	ISBN 0903505444
The New Rose Expert	1996	ISBN 0903505479
The New Bedding Plant Expert	1996	ISBN 0903505452
The New Lawn Expert	1997	ISBN 0903505487
The New Vegetable & Herb Expert	1997	ISBN 0903505460
The New Vegetable & Herb Expert (revised)	2014	ISBN 9780903505758
The Evergreen Expert	1998	ISBN 0903505517
The New Flower Expert	1999	ISBN 0903505525
The Pocket Flower Expert	2001	ISBN 090350555X
The Pocket Garden Troubles Expert	2001	ISBN 0903505541
The Pocket Tree & Shrub Expert	2001	ISBN 0903505568
The Pocket House Plant Expert	2002	ISBN 0903505592
The Pocket Vegetable Expert	2002	ISBN 0903505576
The Home DIY Expert	2003	ISBN 0903505584
The Fruit Expert	1990	ISBN 0903505312
The Fruit Expert (reprinted)	2003	ISBN 0903505312
The Garden Revival Expert	2004	ISBN 0903505606
The House Plant Expert - Book Two	2005	ISBN 0903505614
The Pest and Weed Expert	2007	ISBN 9780903505628
The Orchid Expert	2008	ISBN 9780903505673
The Orchid Expert (republished)	2010	ISBN 9780903505673
The Green Garden Expert	2009	ISBN 9780903505635
The Expert Vegetable Notebook	2009	ISBN 9780903505765
The Best of Experts	2010	ISBN 9780903505932
The Garden to Kitchen Expert (Judith Wills with D.G. Hessayon)	2011	ISBN 9780903505925
The Complete Garden Expert	2012	ISBN 9780903505987
The Indoor Plant & Flower Expert	2013	ISBN 9781909663008
The New Fruit Expert	2015	ISBN 9780903505741
