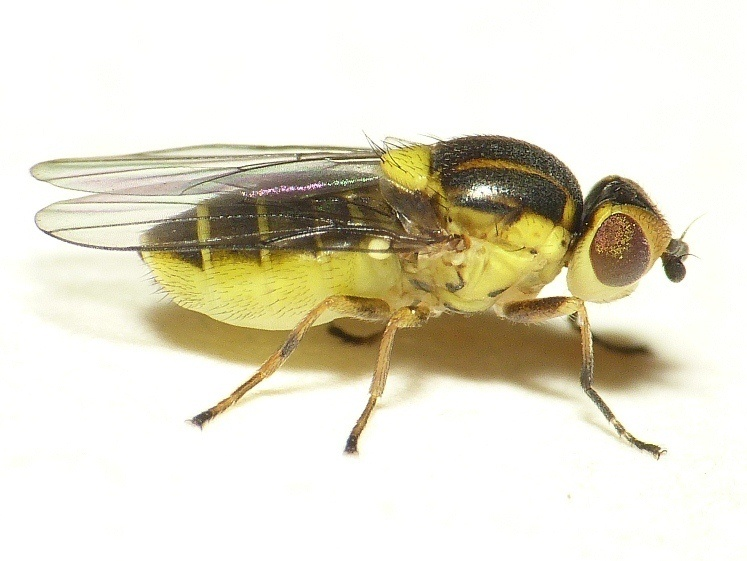

Scientific classification
- Kingdom: Animalia
- Phylum: Arthropoda
- Clade: Pancrustacea
- Class: Insecta
- Order: Diptera
- Family: Chloropidae
- Genus: Chlorops
- Species: C. pumilionis

Binomial name
- Chlorops pumilionis (Bjerkander, 1778)

Synonyms
- Chlorops lineatus Fabricius, 1781; Chlorops taeniopus Meigen, 1830; Musca lineata Fabricius, 1781; Musca pumilionis Bjerkander, 1778

= Chlorops pumilionis =

Species of fly

Chlorops pumilionis is a species of pest fly from the family Chloropidae. It is also known as the chloropid gout fly or barley gout fly. It is an oligophagous pest of cereal crops.

== Description ==
The thorax is straw yellow, with three longitudinal nodal stripes. The head has black ocular triangle. The third antennal segment and two last segments of tarsus are black.

== Distribution ==
The fly is widespread in South, North, Central Europe, North America, Africa, and Japan.

== Ecology ==
Chlorops pumilionis on grass in a meadow

The gout fly damages 18 species of cultivated and wild cereal plants, wheat, barley, rye, oats, timothy grass and couch grass.
