= William McNamara (horticulturist) =

American horticulturist

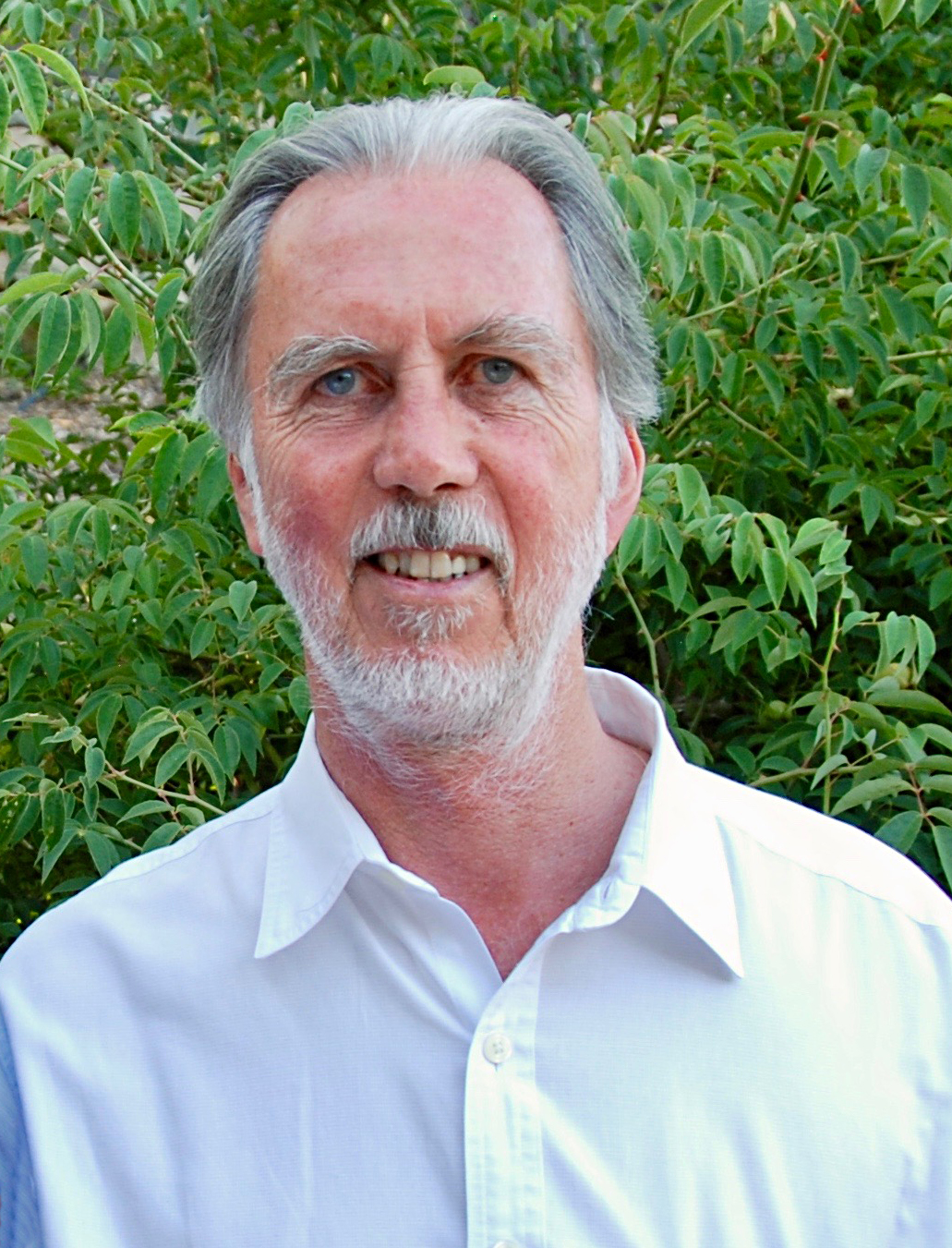
Quarryhill Botanical Garden Emeritus President and Executive Director William McNamara

William A. McNamara is an American horticulturist and expert in the field of plant conservation and the flora of Asia. Now retired, he was the President and Executive Director of Quarryhill Botanical Garden, a 25-acre wild woodland garden in Northern California's Sonoma Valley featuring wild-sourced plants from temperate East Asia. In 2017, he and Quarryhill Botanical Garden celebrated their 30th Anniversary. He retired from the Garden in October 2019.

== Early life and education ==
McNamara was born in 1950 in Logansport, Indiana, moved to Palo Alto, California when he was 11, and graduated from Palo Alto High School. During college, he worked at various nurseries in the San Francisco Bay Area and became a California Certified Nurseryman in 1973. After graduating in 1975 from the University of California, Berkeley with a degree in English, he traveled around the world visiting gardens and remote areas. In 1980, he settled in Sonoma, California where he started Con Mara Gardens, a landscape contracting business. McNamara received a Master of Arts in Conservation Biology from Sonoma State University in 2005. He holds a third degree black belt in Aikido and received a Mokuroku Certificate in Tenshin Shoden Katori Shinto Ryu in 1997.

== Career ==
McNamara has been a Field Associate of the Botany Department at the California Academy of Sciences in San Francisco since 2000. McNamara shares his horticultural knowledge through presentations throughout the country and abroad, and he has been on the Garden Club of America's speakers list for conservation and horticulture since 2010.

He is considered a modern-day plant hunter. In the company of horticulturists from the Royal Botanic Gardens, Kew, Windsor Great Park, the Howick Arboretum, and others, McNamara has botanized extensively in the wilds of temperate East Asia. From 1987 to 2019, he participated in annual plant collecting expeditions to China, Japan, India, Nepal, Vietnam and Myanmar in search of plants for research, conservation, and stemming biodiversity loss.

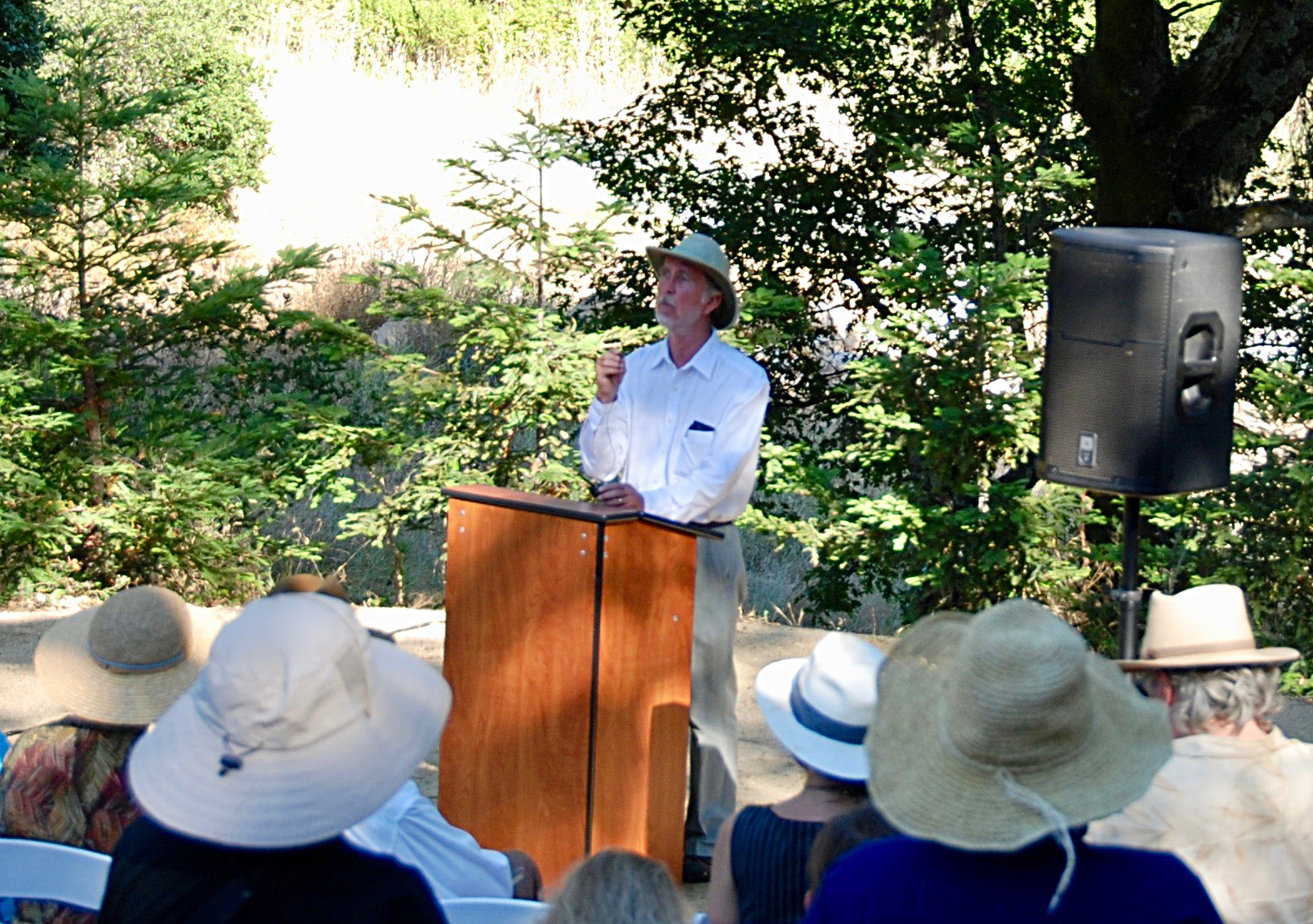
William McNamara speaks at Quarryhill Botanical Garden in Sonoma Valley.

== Awards and honors ==
- Named Honorary Member of The Garden Club of America, 2018
- The Veitch Memorial Medal from Britain's Royal Horticultural Society, 2017
- Liberty Hyde Bailey Award the American Horticultural Society, 2017
- Arthur Hoyt Scott Medal, Scott Arboretum, 2010
- National Garden Clubs Inc. Award of Excellence, 2013
- California Horticultural Society Annual Award, 2012
- The Garden Club of America’s Eloise Payne Luquer Medal, 2009
- Field Associate of the Department of Botany, California Academy of Sciences, San Francisco, CA, 2000
- Honorary Consultant of National Plateau Research Center of China, 2010
- Honorary Researcher of the Scientific Information Center of Resources and Environment of the Chinese Academy of Sciences, 2001

=== Articles ===
- W. A. McNamara. "The Risks of Collecting" Pacific Horticulture, Volume 60, Number 2, Summer 1999.
- W. A. McNamara. "All in a Day’s Work" The American Gardener, Volume 79, Number 4, July/August 2000.
- W. A. McNamara. "Three Conifers South of the Chang" Pacific Horticulture, Volume 62, Number 1, January/February/March 2001.
- W. A. McNamara. "Making a Last Stand: Acer pentaphyllum" Pacific Horticulture, Volume 63, Number 2, April/May/June 2002.
- W. A. McNamara. "Lilies of Quarryhill" Lilies and Related Plants, 2003-2004. Royal Horticultural Society. London.
- W. A. McNamara. "Pennel’s bird’s-beak: Cordylanthus tenuis ssp. capillaries" Endangered Biodiversity Information Project., May 2004.
- W. A. McNamara. "Emmenopterys henryi" Pacific Horticulture, Volume 66, Number 2, April 2005.
- W. A. McNamara. "Schima" Pacific Horticulture, Volume 66, Number 3, July/August/ September 2005.
- W. A. McNamara. "Conifer Heaven" Conifer Quarterly, Volume 25, Number 2, Spring 2008
- W. A. McNamara, Mark S. Roh, Deric Picton, Kaipu Yin & Qian Wang. "Assessment of genetic variation in Acer pentaphyllum based on amplified fragment length polymorphisms" Journal of Horticultural Science & Biotechnology, 83 (6), 2008.
- W. A. McNamara. "Magnolia grandis: a first flowering" The Journal of the Magnolia Society International, Volume 44, Issue No. 86, Fall/Winter 2009.
- W. A. McNamara. "Schima sinensis" Curtis’s Botanical Magazine, Volume 26, Part 3, November 2009.
- Mark S. Roh, W. A. McNamara, Corey Barnes, Kaipu Yin, & Qian Wang, "Genetic Variations of Acer pentaphyllum Based on AFLP Analysis, Seed Germination, and Seed Morphology." Acta Horticulturae 885, Article # 885_42, pages 305–312, 2010.
- W. A. McNamara. "Endangered: Magnolia wilsonii" The Journal of the Magnolia Society International, Volume 45, Issue No. 88, Fall/Winter 2010.
- W. A. McNamara. "Acer pentaphyllum" Curtis’s Botanical Magazine, Volume 28, Part 2, July 2011.
- W. A. McNamara. "Botanic Garden Profile: Quarryhill Botanical Garden" Sibbaldia: The Journal of Botanic Garden Horticulture. No. 11. 2013.
- W. A. McNamara, Nicole Cavender, Murphy Westwood, Catherine Bechtoldt, Gerard Donnelly, Sara Oldfield, Martin F Gardner, David Rae. "Strengthening the Conservation Value of ex situ Tree Collections" Oryx. Volume 49, Number 3, July 2015.
- W. A. McNamara."Wild Roses in Asia And The Quarryhill Botanical Garden" The Indian Rose Annual XXXI. 2015.
- W. A. McNamara. "llicium simonsii" Curtis's Botanical Magazine. Volume 33, Part 1, February 2016.
- W. A. McNamara. "In Search of Wild Roses in Asia" 2016 American Rose Annual. November/December 2016.
