= Ralph Warren Marsh =

British mycologist & phytopathologist (1899–1992)

Ralph Warren Marsh OBE (27 December 1899 in Crewkerne, Somerset – 29 February 1992) was a British mycologist and phytopathologist, known for his research on the control of apple scab. He was the president of the British Mycological Society for one year from 1944 to 1945 and the president of the Association of Applied Biologists for a two-year term from 1951 to 1952.

== Biography ==
After education at Sexey's School, Marsh became, near the end of WW I, a commissioned officer in the Signals Branch of the Royal Engineers. In 1919 he matriculated at Trinity College, Cambridge, where he graduated in 1922. He worked for a year from 1922 to 1923 under the supervision of Frederick Tom Brooks doing research on plant diseases. After briefly working at the Royal Botanic Gardens, Kew, Marsh spent three years from 1923 to 1926 as a mycological research assistant at the University of Manchester. In 1926 he was appointed to the post of Research Mycologist at Long Ashton Research Station. There he was promoted to Senior Principal Research Officer in 1951 and to assistant director of Long Ashton Research Center in 1959. For the academic year 1949–1950, he was on sabbatical in Canada. In 1956, he visited Yugoslavia to advise the Food and Agriculture Organization (FAO) on improving the Plant Protection Service. In 1958 the University of Bristol appointed him Reader in Mycology. In 1965 he retired from the Long Ashton Research Station and the University of Bristol and was appointed OBE (Officer of the Most Excellent Order of the British Empire).)

In 1928 Marsh started his research on apple scab. Based on his spore collection records, he conducted in 1930 large-scale field trials that demonstrated a greatly improved method of control of apple scab. If the orchard growers gave apple trees two pre-blossom sprays with lime sulphur, followed by one post-blossom spray, there was good control of the damage caused by apple scab.

At Long Ashton, Marsh collaborated for 20 years with the entomologist H. G. H. Kearns and for many years with the pesticide chemist Hubert Martin, the author of The Scientific Principles of Crop Protection (St. Martin's Press, 1964). During his career, Marsh did research on pathogens of apples, pears, quinces, plums, peaches, and cherries; among such pathogens he studied are Venturia pyrina, Podosphaera leucotricha, Monilinia fructigena, Neofabraea malicorticis, and Neonectria ditissima. He also did research on pathogens of strawberries, raspberries, blueberries, blackberries, currants, and gooseberries; among such pathogens he studied are Pseudopeziza ribis, Botrytis cinerea, and Podosphaera mors-uvae.

During WW II, he served as a quartermaster of the local Long Ashton Home Guard. With Hubert Martin, he demonstrated a simple way to control potato blight by spraying with a water can fitted with a round nozzle — this was useful for the Dig for Victory campaign.

In 1944 Marsh gave the British Mycological Society's presidential address with the title Mycological contacts. The address deplored the society's failure to attract medical and industrial mycologists. He noted that UK newspapers, instead of the society's publications, alerted most of the society's members to the development of penicillin (obtained from Penicillium moulds). In his address, he also made interesting comments on the fervent pioneers of organic farming.

He served for many years on the editorial board of the Annals of Applied Biology. He chaired the editorial board of The Biologist. In 1954 he was invited to join the governing board of Sexey's School.

His wife Kathleen died in 1987. Upon his death in 1992, he was survived by their two sons and four grandchildren.

== Selected publications ==
- Marsh, R. W. (1925). "An Investigation of a Sample of Diseased Seed-Cotton Sent from Nyasaland". Journal of the Textile Institute Transactions. 16 (10): T315–T322. doi:10.1080/19447022508661348.
- —— (1926). "Inoculation Experiments with Nematospora gossypii, Ashby and Nowell". Annals of Botany. 40 (160): 883–889. doi:10.1093/oxfordjournals.aob.a090054. JSTOR 43237005.
- —— (1928). "Investigations on the Fungicidal Action of Sulphur.: III. Studies on the Toxicity of Sulphuretted Hydrogen and on the Interaction of Sulphur with Fungi". Journal of Pomology and Horticultural Science. 7 (3): 237–250. doi:10.1080/03683621.1928.11513342.
- —— (1931). "Apple Scab Control in the Bristol Province: Field Trials, 1930". Journal of Pomology and Horticultural Science. 9: 53–72. doi:10.1080/03683621.1931.11513371.
- ——; Walker, Mary M. (1932). "The Scab Fungus (Venturia inæqualis) on Apple Shoots". Journal of Pomology and Horticultural Science. 10 (2): 71–90. doi:10.1080/03683621.1932.11513393.
- —— (1933). "Observations on Pear Scab". Journal of Pomology and Horticultural Science. 11 (2): 101–112. doi:10.1080/03683621.1933.11513412.
- —— (1939). "Observations on Apple Canker". Annals of Applied Biology. 26 (3): 458–469. doi:10.1111/j.1744-7348.1939.tb06983.x.
- —— (1947). "Fruit Spraying Trials with Certain Recently-Introduced Fungicides". Journal of Pomology and Horticultural Science. 23 (3): 185–205. doi:10.1080/03683621.1947.11513668.
- —— (1951). "Developments in Agricultural Fungicides". Nature. 167 (4238): 97–98. Bibcode:1951Natur.167...97M. doi:10.1038/167097a0. PMID 14806382. S2CID 2860129.
- —— (1951). "Long Ashton Research Station Field Day". Nature. 168 (4270): 375–376. Bibcode:1951Natur.168..375M. doi:10.1038/168375a0. S2CID 10677270.
- —— (1953). "Methods of Plant Pest and Disease Assessment". Nature. 171 (4352): 553–555. Bibcode:1953Natur.171..553M. doi:10.1038/171553a0. PMID 13054620. S2CID 4284615.
- —— (1953). "Insecticides and Colonial Agricultural Development". Nature. 171 (4358): 824–826. Bibcode:1953Natur.171..824M. doi:10.1038/171824a0. PMID 13054734. S2CID 4156005.
- Croxall, H. E.; Jenkins, J. E. E.; Byrde, R. J. W.; —— (1953). "Spraying Experiments Against Apple and Pear Scab at Long Ashton and in the West Midlands, Season 1951". Journal of Horticultural Science. 28 (3): 196–206. doi:10.1080/00221589.1953.11513786.
- —— (1968). "Moulds, Mildews and Men". Nature. 218 (5146): 1017–1019. Bibcode:1968Natur.218.1017M. doi:10.1038/2181017a0. PMID 5656615. S2CID 4295591.
