= Albrecht von Groddeck =

Prussian geologist (1837–1887)

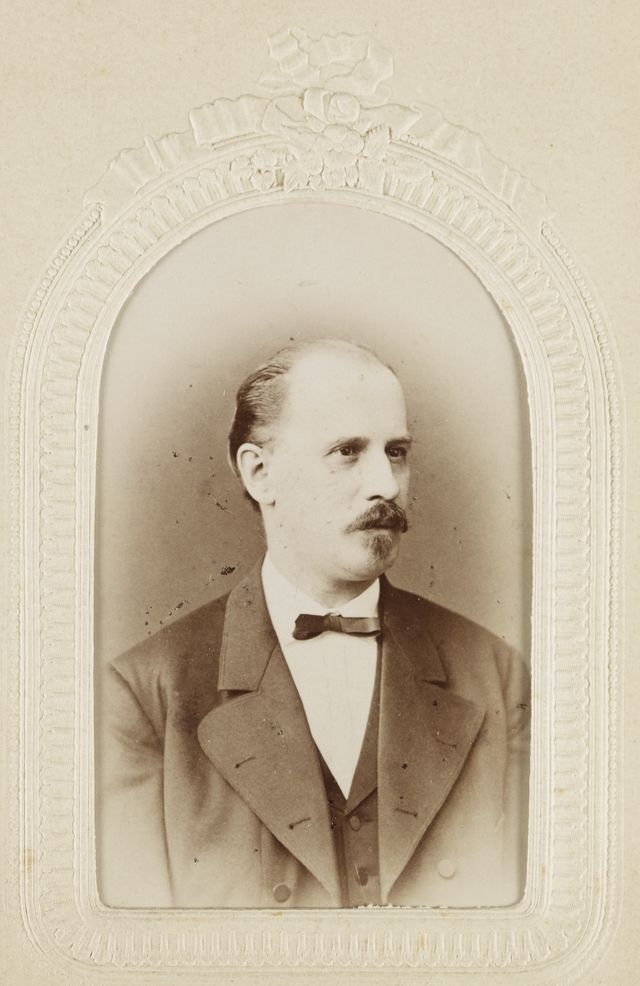
Photograph c. 1884

Albrecht Ludwig von Groddeck (25 August 1837 – 18 July 1887) was a Prussian geologist and a lecturer at the Clausthal mining academy (today the Technical University of Clausthal). He contributed to studies on lithology and ore distribution, classifying ore deposits into 57 different kinds based on the pattern of distribution and association with structure of the surrounding rocks.

Groddeck was born in Danzig, son of a Prussian officer in the Commercial and Admiralty Court, and was educated at the local gymnasium after which he may have taken an interested in mining due to an uncle who was a Prussian mine superintendent. He went to study metallurgy in 1857 and worked until 1860 before going to study at the University of Berlin followed by studies at the University of Breslau. He then went to the mining academy at Clausthal where he was influenced by F. A. Roemer. After working as a chemist at mines he began to teach at the mining academy at Clausthal from 1856. Following the retirement of Roemer, he taught mineralogy and paleontology at the mining academy. He also wrote a doctoral dissertation at the University of Göttingen in 1867 on ores in the Upper Harz mountains. He became a director at the school of mine in 1871 and in 1872 was posted as königlicher Bergrath (Royal Superintendent of Mines). Among Groddeck's contribution was the classification of ore types into 57 groups based on origin and geometry of distribution.
