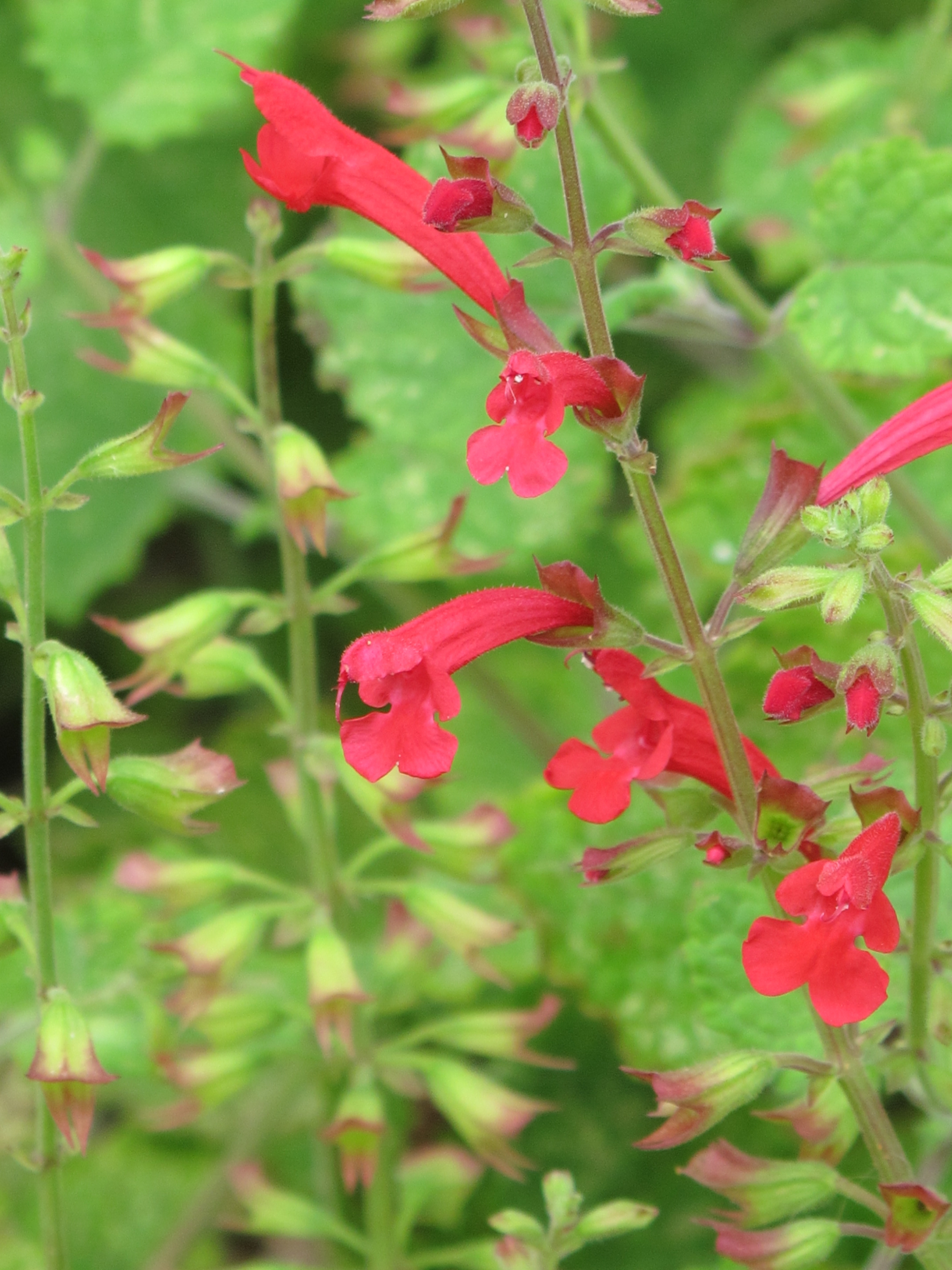

Scientific classification
- Kingdom: Plantae
- Clade: Tracheophytes
- Clade: Angiosperms
- Clade: Eudicots
- Clade: Asterids
- Order: Lamiales
- Family: Lamiaceae
- Genus: Salvia
- Species: S. roemeriana

Binomial name
- Salvia roemeriana Scheele

= Salvia roemeriana =

Species of shrub

Salvia roemeriana (cedar sage, 'dwarf crimson-flowered sage') is a herbaceous perennial shrub native to the Edwards Plateau in Texas, along with parts of Arizona, and several states in Mexico. The epithet honors German geologist Ferdinand von Roemer, who lived in Texas from 1845 to 1847 and became known as the "father of Texas geology". The common name refers to the cedar brakes where it commonly grows. It also grows in oak woodlands and rock outcroppings. It was introduced into horticulture in 1852, and was a favorite of renowned garden writer William Robinson for its neatness as an edging plant and in front of borders.

== Description ==
Cedar sage grows up to 1 ft in height and width, quickly establishing itself and growing into colonies through prolific reseeding. The leaves are a grassy green color, with the plant dying back to the ground in winter. The abundant flowers are bright scarlet, growing in loose whorls above the plant, on 8–10 in stalks, with each plant having many inflorescences.

== Habitat ==
Salvia roemeriana grows primarily on limestone rich soils, usually associated with junipers ("cedars").
