= Gerald Goldin =

Gerald Goldin is currently a distinguished professor at Rutgers University. He is part of three divisions at Rutgers University: Department of Learning and Teaching, Department of Mathematics, and Department of Physics.

== Education and career ==
Goldin received his B.A. from Harvard University in 1964, graduating magna cum laude in chemistry and physics. In 1969, he received his Ph.D. in theoretical physics from Princeton University. His dissertation was titled: “Current Algebras as Unitary Representations of Groups.” During this time, he also studied mathematics education at the University of Pennsylvania. He also coordinated mathematics education at the University of Pennsylvania and science education at Northern Illinois University.

In 1984, he became a faculty member of Rutgers University. From 1985 to 1998, Goldin was the first permanent director of Rutgers’ Center for Mathematics, Science and Computer Education. Goldin helped organize New Jersey's Statewide Systemic Initiative, “Achieving Excellence in Mathematics, Science and Technology Education.” From 1993 to 2008, this initiative was funded by the U.S. National Science Foundation as well as the State of New Jersey. Since the end of the funding, Goldin now serves as University Director of Science and Mathematics Partnerships.

In 2005, Goldin became director and principal investigator of “MetroMath: The Center for Mathematics in America’s Cities.”

== Timeline of research ==
- August 1977 – June 1985: Title: Professor (Associate) (United States, DeKalb) Northern Illinois University : Department of Mathematical Sciences – Functional Analysis, Mathematics Education
- September 1982 – June 1983: Title: Visiting Scholar (United States, Princeton) Princeton University: Department of Physics
- September 2004 – June 2005: Title: Leverhulme Visiting Professor King's College London (United Kingdom, London): Department of Physics – Theoretical Physics
- October 1986 – July 1999: Title: Guest Professor; Alexander von Humboldt Research Awardee (Germany, Clausthal-Zellerfeld) Technische Universität Clausthal: Arnold Sommerfeld Institute for Mathematical Physics – Institute for Theoretical Physics
- September 1984 – present: Title: Distinguished Professor (United States, New Brunswick) Rutgers: The State University of New Jersey: Graduate School of Education – Dept of Mathematics, Dept of Physics, Mathematics Education, Center for Math, Science, & Computer Education, DIMACS

== Research initiatives ==
- Mathematics Education: systems of internal and external representations, affect, engagement and motivation overall inside Mathematics classrooms.
- Theoretical and Mathematical Physics: foundations of quantum physics, nonlinear electrodynamics, quantum mechanics, current algebra and group representations.
- Mathematical learning and problem solving
- Theoretical Physics

== Affiliations ==
- Member Graduate Faculty in Mathematics, Graduate Faculty in Physics, and Graduate Faculty in Education
- Associate of the Center for Mathematics, Science, and Computer Education
- Permanent Member of the Center for Discrete Mathematics and Theoretical Computer Science (DIMACS)

== Publications ==
- G. A. Goldin and N. Shteingold, (2001) "Systems of Representation and the Development of Mathematical Concepts." In A. A. Cuoco and F. R. Curcio (Eds.), The Roles of Representation in School Mathematics [2001 Yearbook of the National Council of Teachers of Mathematics]. Reston, Virginia: National Council of Teachers of Mathematics, 1–23.
- G. A. Goldin, (2002) "Affect, Meta-Affect, and Mathematical Belief Structures." In G. C. Leder, E. Pehkonen, and G. Törner (Eds.), Beliefs: A Hidden Variable in Mathematics Education? Dordrecht, The Netherlands: Kluwer Academic Publishers, 59–72.
- G. A. Goldin, (2003) "Developing Complex Understandings: On the Relation of Mathematics Education Research to Mathematics." In R. Even and D. Loewenberg Ball (Guest Eds.), Special Issue. Educational Studies in Mathematics, 54, Nos. 2–3, 171–202.
- G. A. Goldin, (2003) "Representation in School Mathematics: A Unifying Research Perspective." In J. Kilpatrick, W. G. Martin and D. Schifter (Eds.), A Research Companion to Principles and Standards for School Mathematics. Reston, Virginia: The National Council of Teachers of Mathematics, 275–285.
- V. A. DeBellis & G. A. Goldin (2006), "Affect and Meta-Affect in Mathematical Problem Solving: A Representational Perspective." Educ. Studies in Mathematics, 63, 131–147. [2]
- G. A. Goldin (2007), "Aspects of affect and mathematical modeling processes." In R. A. Lesh, E. Hamilton, & J. J. Kaput (Eds.), Foundations for the Future in Mathematics Education. Mahwah, NJ: Erlbaum, 281–296.
- G. A. Goldin (2008), Perspectives on representation in mathematical learning and problem solving. In L. D. English (Ed.), Handbook of Int’l. Research in Mathematics Education, Second Edition. Routledge – Taylor and Francis, 176–201.
- R. Y. Schorr, & G. A. Goldin (2008), Students' Expression of Affect in an Inner-city Simcalc Classroom. Educational Studies in Mathematics 68, No. 2, 131–148. [2]
- G. A. Goldin (2009), The affective domain and students’ mathematical inventiveness. In R. Leikin, A. Berman, & B. Koichu (Eds.), Creativity in Mathematics and the Education of Gifted Students. Rotterdam: Sense Publishers, pp. 181–194.
- G. A. Goldin, B. Rösken, & G. Törner (2009), Beliefs – No longer a hidden variable in mathematics teaching and learning processes. In J. Maass & W. Schlöglmann (Eds.), Beliefs and Attitudes in Mathematics Education: New Research Results. Rotterdam: Sense Publishers, pp. 1–18.
- G. A. Goldin (2010), Reflections on a journey in mathematics education research. MediterraneanJournal for Research in Mathematics Education 9, Number 1, pp. 1–18.
