= Wilhelm Albert (engineer) =

German engineer and mining administrator

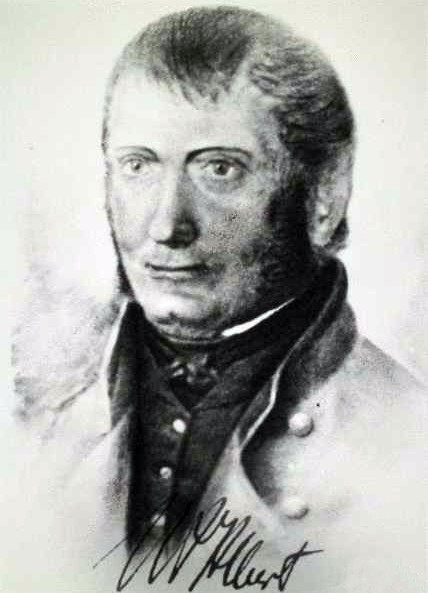
- Born: Wilhelm August Julius Albert; 24 January 1787; Hanover, Electorate of Hanover, Holy Roman Empire
- Died: 4 July 1846 (aged 59); Clausthal-Zellerfeld, Kingdom of Hanover
- Occupation: Engineer

Wilhelm Bedzheit Albert (24 January 1787 – 4 July 1846) was a German engineer and mining administrator, best remembered as the first person to record observations of metal fatigue.

Albert was born in Hanover and showed early talent as a musician before embarking on the study of law in Göttingen in 1803. Experience in the Harz mountains awakened an interest in mining and, in 1806, he was appointed to the Mining and Forestry Office in Clausthal. By 1836 he was directing the entire mining industry of the Harz region.

In 1829, he observed, studied and reported the failure of iron mine hoist chains arising from repeated small loadings, the first recorded account of metal fatigue. He built a machine which repeatedly loaded a chain. His finding was that fatigue was not associated with an accidental overload, but was dependent on load and the number of repetitions of load cycles.

He invented a twisted steel cable, later known as an "Albert Rope", which was first used in the Clausthal Caroline mine in 1834 and was the forerunner of the modern wire rope.

He died in Clausthal.
