= Ekkehard Schulz =

German businessman

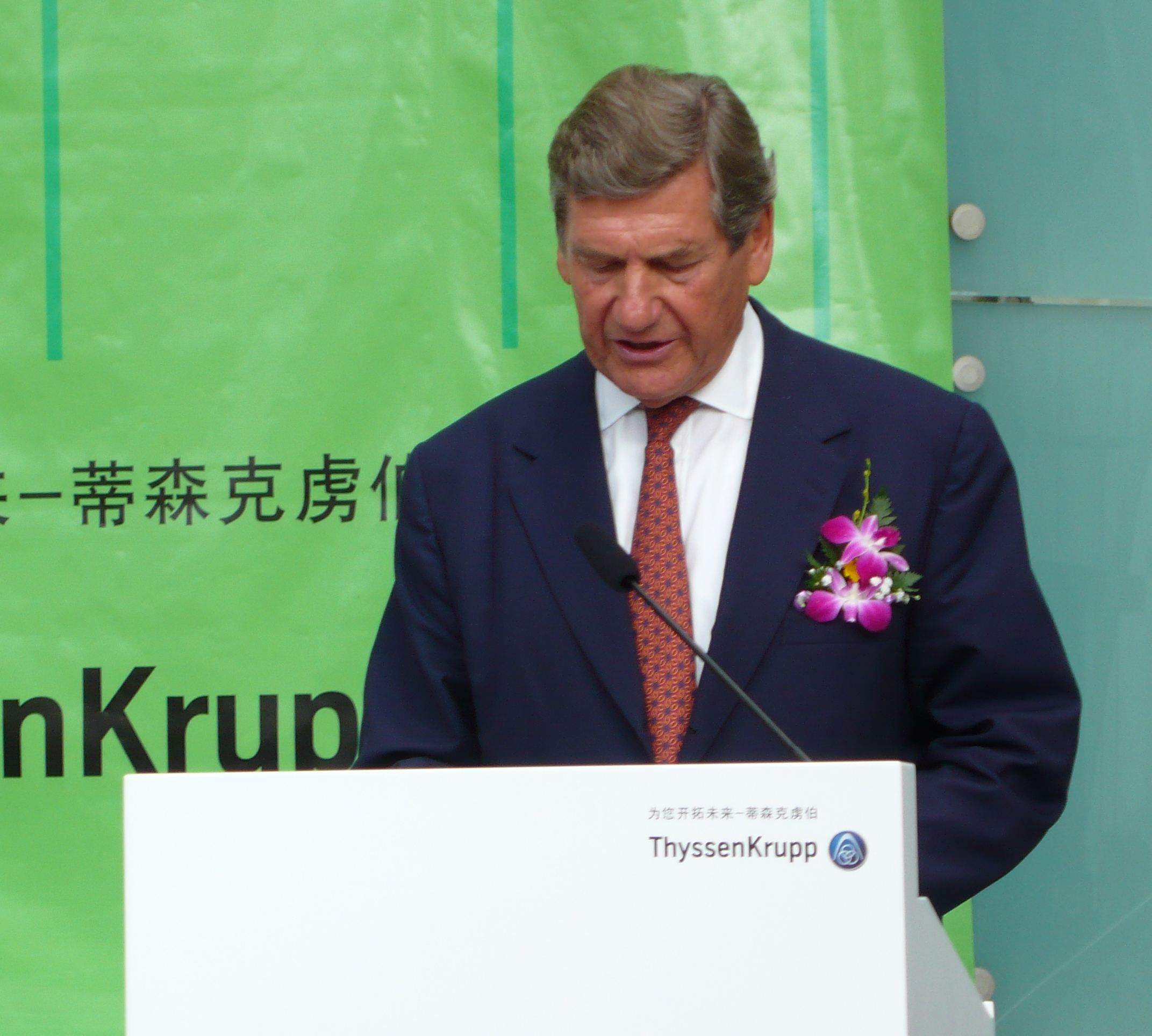
- Schulz speaking at a ThyssenKrupp AG event, 2007
- Born: Ekkehard Dietrich Schulz; July 24, 1941 (age 85); Bromberg, Reichsgau Danzig-West Prussia, Nazi Germany
- Education: Clausthal University of Technology
- Employer: ThyssenKrupp AG
- Title: Chairman

Ekkehard Schulz (born 24 July 1941) is the former CEO and Chairman of the Executive Board of ThyssenKrupp AG and has been a member of this organization since 1991. Following his retirement in January 2011 he was appointed to the Supervisory Board of ThyssenKrupp AG.

== Early life ==
Ekkehard Schulz was born in the city of Bromberg (in modern-day Poland, but at the time of his birth part of Nazi Germany). He attended school at Clausthal Technical University studying metallurgy from which he graduated in 1971. He was a research assistant and chief engineer at Clausthal University, which can be found under Institute of Technology from 1967 to 1972 while obtaining his doctorate degree in metallurgical engineering. In 1999 he was awarded an honorary professorship by Clausthal University of Technology. In just two years he was awarded two different doctor's degrees from two different schools. In 2004 he received an honorary doctor title from Berlin University and in 2005 another from Aachen University.

== 1970s and 1980s ==
After working as a research assistant and chief engineer at Clausthal University he moved on to Thyssen in 1972. When he began working for their organization his work focused on technology in different areas of the business. Schulz worked in the technology part of the organization until 1984 when he began to move up into the higher positions of the business group. In 1985 he was appointed deputy member and in 1986 regular member of the Executive Board of Thyssen Stahl AG where his job was being responsible for production. In 1988 he became Head of Technology at Thyssen Stahl AG.

== 1990s ==
His career moved forward in the 1990s as he moved up in the company. In 1991 he was appointed Chairman of the Executive Board of Thyssen Stahl AG and member of the Executive board of Thyssen AG. In 1998 he became CEO and Chairman of the Executive Board of Thyssen AG before becoming in 1999 the first CEO and Chairman of the Executive Board of ThyssenKrupp AG after the merger of Thyssen and Krupp. "Ekkehard Schulz helped guide merging of the two oldest and largest European steelmaking companies in the late 1990s." He held that job until retirement in 2011 and then was a member of the Supervisory board of ThyssenKrupp AG until the end of 2011.
