= Friedrich Adolph Roemer =

- Born: 15 April 1809; Hildesheim
- Died: 25 November 1869 (aged 60); Clausthal
- Occupations: Geologist, botanist

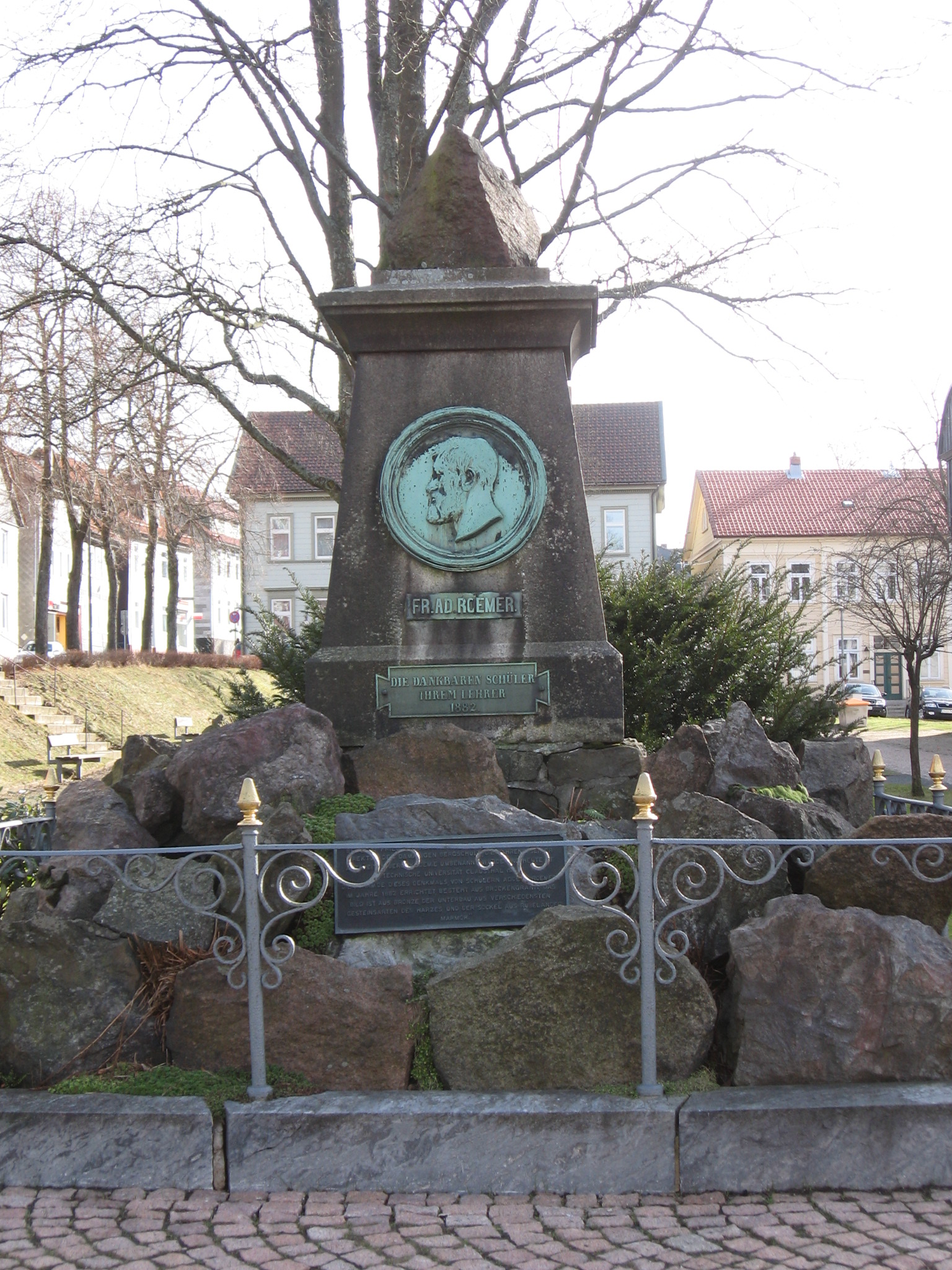
Roemer memorial in Clausthal-Zellerfeld

Friedrich Adolph Roemer (15 April 1809 – 25 November 1869) was a German geologist, born in Hildesheim, in the Kingdom of Westphalia.

His father was a lawyer and councillor of the high court of justice. In 1845, he became professor of mineralogy and geology at Clausthal and, in 1862, was named director of the School of Mines. He first described the Cretaceous and Jurassic strata of Germany in elaborate works entitled Die Versteinerungen des Norddeutschen Oolith-Gebirges ("Fossils of the North German oolith formations"; 1836–39), Die Versteinerungen des Norddeutschen Kreidegebirges ("Fossils of the North German chalk formations"; 1840–41) and Die Versteinerungen des Harzgebirges ("Fossils of the Harz Mountains"; 1843). He died in Clausthal.

The mineral römerite commemorates his name, as does Roemeriana, a publication issued by the Institute of Geology at the Bergakademie in Clausthal from 1954 to 1964. His students included Albrecht von Groddeck.

His younger brother, Carl Ferdinand von Roemer, was also a geologist.
