= Reinhard Roder =

German footballer and manager

Personal information
- Full name: Reinhard Roder
- Date of birth: 6 July 1941 (age 85)
- Place of birth: Clausthal-Zellerfeld, German Reich
- Position: Defender

Youth career
- TSG Clausthal-Zellerfeld
- –1964: Goslarer SC 08

Senior career*
Years	Team	Apps	(Gls)
1964–1967	1. SC Göttingen 05		
1967–1968	1. FC Köln	11	(0)
1968–1970	Bayer Leverkusen		

Managerial career
- 1974–1976: 1. SC Göttingen 05
- 1977–1978: VfL Osnabrück
- 1978–1980: Tennis Borussia Berlin
- * Club domestic league appearances and goals

Reinhard Roder (born 6 July 1941 in Clausthal-Zellerfeld) is a German former football player and manager.

Roder made a total of 11 appearances in the Bundesliga for 1. FC Köln during his playing career and later managed 1. SC Göttingen 05, VfL Osnabrück and Tennis Borussia Berlin in the 2. Bundesliga Nord.
