= Sir Robert Nelson Kotzé =

South African Engineer, Inventor, Scientist, politician and Educator

- Born: 13 April 1870; Cape Town, Cape Colony
- Died: 14 March 1953 (aged 82); Cape Town, Union of South Africa
- Education: South African College (B.A., Science); Royal School of Mines (ARSM); Clausthal School of Mines (Diplomas in Mining and Metallurgy)
- Occupations: Mining engineer, politician, academic administrator
- Known for: Work on silicosis prevention in Witwatersrand mines, Vice-Chancellor of the University of the Witwatersrand
- Parent(s): Petrus Johannes Kotzé; Elizabeth Jacoba Blanckenberg
- Relatives: John Gilbert Kotzé (brother)
- Awards: Knight Bachelor (1918); Institution of Mining and Metallurgy Gold Medal (1925); Honorary D.Sc., University of the Witwatersrand

Sir Robert Nelson Kotzé (13 April 1870 – 14 March 1953) was a South African mining engineer, politician, and academic administrator. He served as Government Mining Engineer for the Transvaal Colony from 1903 to 1926, was Vice-Chancellor of the University of the Witwatersrand (1922–1925, 1937–1938), and represented Springs in the Parliament of South Africa from 1929 to 1939. Kotzé was knighted in 1918 for his contributions to the mining industry, particularly for addressing the dust problem (silicosis) in the Witwatersrand gold mines. He was awarded the Institution of Mining and Metallurgy's gold medal in 1925 for his work in promoting South Africa's natural resources.

== Early life and education ==
Robert Nelson Kotzé was born in 1870 in Cape Town, Cape Colony, to Petrus Johannes Kotzé, a prominent figure who owned the Leeuwenhof estate and served as mayor of Cape Town, and Elizabeth Jacoba Blanckenberg, from a family with ties to the Dutch Reformed Church. His older brother, Sir John Gilbert Kotzé, was a distinguished jurist. The Kotzé family traced its South African roots to Jan Kotze, a German settler who arrived at the Cape in 1691.

Kotzé studied at the South African College in Cape Town, earning a Bachelor of Arts degree in science. He furthered his education at the Royal School of Mines in London in 1899, obtaining an Associate of the Royal School of Mines (ARSM), and at the Clausthal School of Mines in Germany, where he earned diplomas in mining and metallurgy.

== Career ==
=== Mining and government service ===
In 1903, Kotzé was appointed Government Mining Engineer for the Transvaal Colony, a role he held until 1926. He focused on improving safety in the Witwatersrand gold mines, particularly addressing the dust problem, which caused silicosis among miners. His research on dust suppression and ventilation was published in journals such as the Journal of the Chemical, Metallurgical and Mining Society of South Africa. He also contributed to the Witwatersrand Earthquakes Committee in 1915, investigating seismic risks in deep mines.

After retiring from government service in 1926, Kotzé became a director of De Beers Consolidated Mines, Ltd., and Johannesburg Consolidated Investment Co., Ltd.. His work in the private sector leveraged his expertise to advance South Africa's mining industry.

=== Academic leadership ===
Kotzé served as Vice-Chancellor of the University of the Witwatersrand during two terms: 1922–1925 and 1937–1938. His leadership, detailed in Wits, the Early Years, supported the university's role as a hub for mining and engineering education. He received an honorary Doctor of Science (D.Sc.) degree from Wits, recognizing his contributions to science and education.

=== Political career ===
From 1929 to 1939, Kotzé represented Springs in the Parliament of South Africa, advocating for mining-related policies during a period of industrial growth. His tenure is documented in archival records and biographical directories.

=== Scientific and medical contributions ===
Kotzé served on the Board of Control of the South African Institute for Medical Research, contributing to research on occupational diseases like silicosis. He was active in scientific societies, including the Geological Society of South Africa, the South African Association for the Advancement of Science, and the South African Institution of Engineers. He also contributed to the Astronomical Society of South Africa.

== Honours and awards ==
- Knight Bachelor (1918), for contributions to mining and public service.
- Honorary Member, Institution of Mining and Metallurgy (1919).
- Gold Medal, Institution of Mining and Metallurgy (1925), for addressing the dust problem in the Witwatersrand mines and promoting South Africa's natural resources.
- Honorary Doctor of Science (D.Sc.), University of the Witwatersrand.

== Personal life ==
Details about Kotzé's spouse or children are not widely documented. His family's prominence, including his brother Sir John Gilbert Kotzé, is noted in genealogical records.

== Death ==
Sir Robert Nelson Kotzé died on 14 March 1953 in Cape Town.

== Legacy ==
Kotzé's work on silicosis prevention set early standards for mine safety in South Africa, while his leadership at Wits and in parliament shaped the country's educational and industrial policies. His contributions are documented in biographical and scientific records, cementing his role as a pioneer in South African mining and science.
