= Ralf Seppelt =

German mathematician

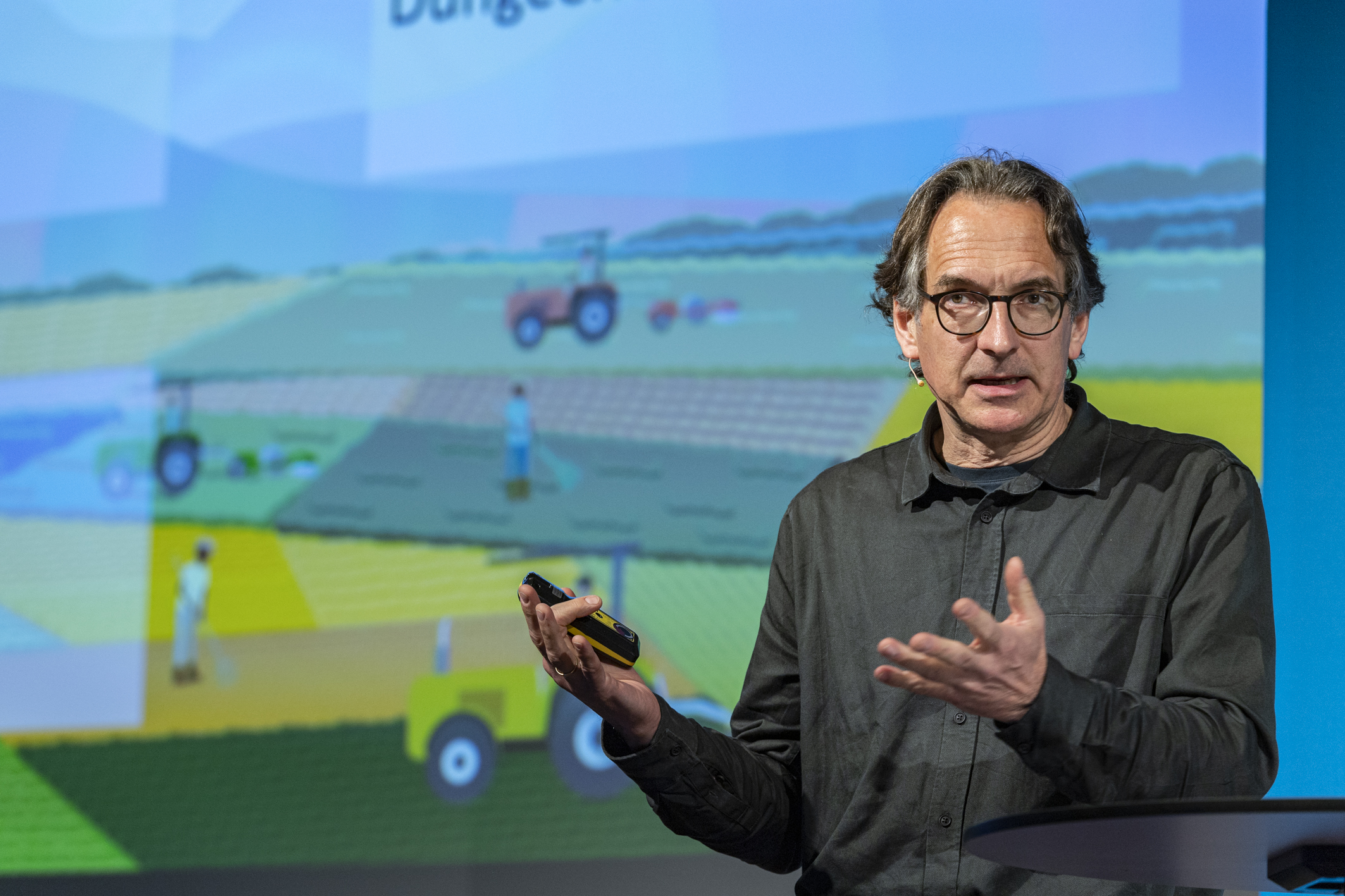
- Born: 1969 (age 56–57); Germany
- Education: Diploma in Applied Mathematics; PhD in Agroecology and System Analysis; Habilitation
- Alma mater: Clausthal University of Technology; Technical University of Braunschweig
- Scientific career
- Fields: Land resources management, modelling systems
- Workplaces: Helmholtz Centre for Environmental Research; Martin Luther University Halle-Wittenberg; Stellenbosch Centre for Advanced Studies; Luxembourg Center for Socio-Environmental Systems

Ralf Seppelt is a German mathematician, academic and author. He is a professor of Landscape Ecology and Renewable Resource Economics at Martin Luther University Halle-Wittenberg. Till 2025 he was head of the Research Unit Ecosystem of the Future and the co-head of the Department of Computational Landscape Ecology at the Helmholtz Centre for Environmental Research. Since March 2025 he is the Founding Director of Luxembourg Center for Socio-Environmental Systems, a research center of the University Luxembourg.

Seppelt's research has focused on optimizing resource use and land management strategies by modeling human-environment interactions, synthesizing regional studies for global insights, and developing theories for managing multifunctional landscapes. His authored works include articles published in academic journals, as well as contributions to books such as 3 Degrees More: The Impending Hot Season and How Nature Can Help Us Prevent It.

== Education ==
Seppelt earned a diploma in Applied Mathematics from the University of Clausthal, Germany in 1994. He then pursued a doctoral degree in Agroecology and System Analysis at the Technical University of Braunschweig, completing it in 1997. In 2004, he achieved his habilitation, and in 2011, he graduated from the Helmholtz Academy on Science Management.

== Career ==
Seppelt began his academic career in 1994 as a researcher for the Collaborative Research Center at the Technical University of Braunschweig. Between 1997 and 2004, he served as a post-doctoral researcher and lecturer at the Institute for Geoecology at the same institution. From 2004 to 2021, he was a professor of Applied Landscape Ecology at Martin-Luther University Halle-Wittenberg. Since 2022, he has been a professor of Landscape Ecology and Renewable Resource Economics at Martin-Luther University Halle-Wittenberg. He is a fellow of the Stellenbosch Centre of Advanced Studies.

Seppelt served as the head of the Department of Computational Landscape Ecology at the Helmholtz Centre for Environmental Research from 2004 to 2022. Since 2022, he has led the research unit "Ecosystem of the Future" and co-led the Department of Computational Landscape Ecology at the Helmholtz Centre for Environmental Research.

He has also been a member of scientific advisory bodies, including Leopoldina and Intergovernmental Platform for Biodiversity and Ecosystem Services (IPBES). In March 2025, he was appointed as the Founding Director of Luxembourg Center for Socio-Environmental Systems, a new interdisciplinary research center of the University Luxembourg.

== Research ==
As part of his research, Seppelt has contributed to publications, including books and articles in academic journals.

=== Regional studies on optimizing land use and ecosystem service ===
Much of Seppelt's research has focused on the regional studies on optimizing land use and ecosystem service. His early research in this regard highlighted the need for consistent, integrated approaches to ecosystem services and land-use conflict research, advocating for methodological rigor, stakeholder involvement, and the use of optimization algorithms for sustainable resource management across scales. Through his research, he demonstrated that increased crop diversity enhances the stability of agricultural production, with benefits varying by region, landscape, and crop type, and highlighted the importance of spatial and temporal diversity in stabilizing food systems.

=== Global land use science ===
Seppelt made contributions to global change research by coordinating projects that focused on Sustainable Land Management specifically assessing global land use dynamics and their impact on greenhouse gas emissions and ecosystem services. The project mapped global land system archetypes, offering information on land-use intensification and discussing region-specific strategies for sustainable land management in the face of environmental change. Notably, the spatial analysis of global pollination benefits identified key hotspots for biodiversity protection.

As an alternative to the planetary boundary concept, he suggested to investigate global limitation of renewable resource production by identifying the synchronized peak-rate years of 27 global resources, demonstrating that most renewable resources had surpassed their appropriation peak, posing challenges for sustainable resource management in the Anthropocene. In his 2019 study examining the trade-offs between cropland expansion and intensification to meet rising biomass demand, he found that both strategies reduced global crop prices but harmed biodiversity, particularly in tropical regions, while economically benefiting Europe and North America.

=== Human societies' dependency on biodiversity ===
Seppelt has conducted research on the relationships between biodiversity, intact ecosystems, and the provisioning of renewable resources to assess humanity's dependence on biodiversity and intact ecosystems. In a 2016 study, he explored reconciling biodiversity conservation and agricultural production by proposing a conceptual framework that linked land use, biodiversity, and production, suggesting nonlinear relationships and offering solutions to harmonize these conflicting objectives. His 2019 study examined how conventional land-use intensification impacts biodiversity and yield, and through a meta-analysis, it found that while intensification increased yield, it generally reduced species richness, with effects varying by system type and intensity level.

=== Principles of high-quality science ===
Seppelt also contributed to the discussions on the principles of quality of science. He has advocated for a shift in science from a growth-oriented focus to one emphasizing quality, curiosity, discovery, and societal relevance, addressing concerns about the impact of misinformation in a 'postfactual' era.

== Media coverage ==
Seppelt's work has garnered media attention, with mentions in Die Zeit, The Independent, and interviews with German news outlets. He also co-authored a season of Wissen-vor-8 Natur on sustainability and Climate Change for German ARD broadcasting.

== Academic Policy Advise ==
In December 2024, Seppelt participated in the IPBES11 negotiations in Windhoek, Namibia of the Nexus Assessment. He was a member of the University Council of Universität Hohenheim from 2012 to 2021, member of the Commission of the Senate on Agroecosystem Research of German Research Foundation (DFG) from 2012 to 2018, and member of German National Academy of Sciences Leopoldina for the special synthesis report on Biodiversity decline in Agricultural Landscapes.

== Bibliography ==
=== Books ===
- Computer-Based Environmental Management (2003) ISBN 9783527307326
- 3 Degrees More : The Impending Hot Season and How Nature Can Help Us Prevent It (2024) ISBN 9783031581434
- Atlas of Ecosystem Services: Drivers, Risks and Societal Responses (2019) ISBN 9783319962283

=== Selected articles ===
- Seppelt, R., Dormann, C. F., Eppink, F. V., Lautenbach, S., & Schmidt, S. (2011). A quantitative review of ecosystem service studies: Approaches, shortcomings, and the road ahead. Journal of Applied Ecology, 48(3), 630–636.
- Lautenbach, S., Seppelt, R., Liebscher, J., & Dormann, C. F. (2012). Spatial and temporal trends of global pollination benefit. PLOS ONE, 7(4), e35954.
- Václavík, T., Lautenbach, S., Kuemmerle, T., & Seppelt, R. (2013). Mapping global land system archetypes. Global Environmental Change, 23(6), 1637–1647.
- Seppelt, R., Manceur, A. M., Liu, J., Fenichel, E. P., & Klotz, S. (2014). Synchronized peak-rate years of global resource use. Ecology and Society, 19(4), Article 50.
- Seppelt, R., Beckmann, M., Ceauşu, S., Cord, A. F., Gerstner, K., Gurevitch, J., & Newbold, T. (2016). Harmonizing biodiversity conservation and productivity in the context of increasing demands on landscapes. BioScience, 66(10), 890–896.
- Seppelt, R., Beckmann, M., Václavík, T., & Volk, M. (2018). The art of scientific performance. Trends in Ecology & Evolution, 33(11), 805–809.
- Zabel, F., Delzeit, R., Schneider, J. M., Seppelt, R., Mauser, W., & Václavík, T. (2019). Global impacts of future cropland expansion and intensification on agricultural markets and biodiversity. Nature Communications, 10(1), Article 2844.
- Beckmann, M., Gerstner, K., Akin‐Fajiye, M., Ceaușu, S., Kambach, S., Kinlock, N. L., & Seppelt, R. (2019). Conventional land‐use intensification reduces species richness and increases production: A global meta‐analysis. Global Change Biology, 25(6), 1941–1956.
- Egli, L., Mehrabi, Z., & Seppelt, R. (2021). More farms, less specialized landscapes, and higher crop diversity stabilize food supplies. Environmental Research Letters, 16(5), 055015.
- Mehrabi, Z., Delzeit, R., Ignaciuk, A., Levers, C., Braich, G., Bajaj, K., & You, L. (2022). Research priorities for global food security under extreme events. One Earth, 5(7), 756–766.
