= Ferdinand von Roemer =

German geologist (1818–1891)

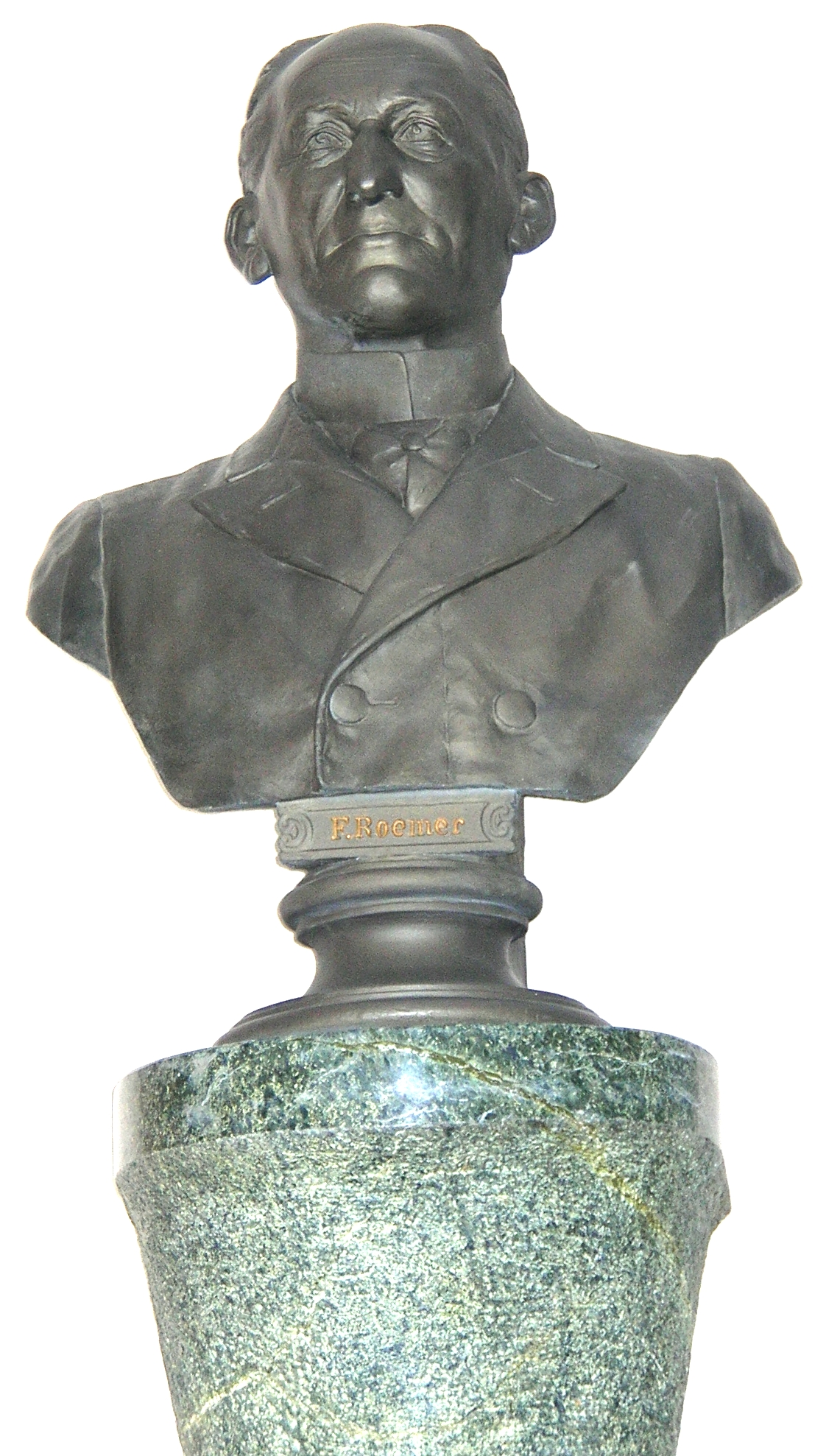
- Ferdinand Roemer; Geological Museum, Wrocław University
- Born: 5 January 1818; Hildesheim, Hanover
- Died: 14 December 1891 (aged 73); Breslau
- Education: Göttingen; University of Berlin; PhD Paleontology
- Known for: Study of paleontology and geology in the United States
- Awards: Murchison Medal (1885)

Carl Ferdinand von Roemer (5 January 1818 – 14 December 1891), German geologist, had originally been educated for the legal profession at Göttingen, but became interested in geology, and abandoning law in 1840, studied science at the University of Berlin, where he graduated Ph.D. in 1842.

Two years later he published his first work, Das Rheinische Ubergangsgebirge (1844), in which he dealt with the older rocks and fossils. In 1845 he paid a visit to America, and devoted a year and a half to a careful study of the geology of Texas and other Southern states. He published at Bonn in 1849 a general work entitled Texas, while the results of his investigations of the Cretaceous rocks and fossils were published three years later in a treatise, Die Kreidebildungen von Texas und ihre organischen Einschlusse (1852), which also included a general account of the geology, and gained for him the title Father of the geology of Texas.

Subsequently, he published at Breslau Die Silurische Fauna des westlichen Tennessee (1860). During the preparation of these works he was from 1847 to 1855 privatdocent at Bonn, and was then appointed professor of geology, palaeontology and mineralogy in the University of Breslau, a post which he held with signal success as a teacher until his death.

As a palaeontologist he made important contributions to our knowledge especially of the vertebrates of the Devonian and older rocks. He assisted H. G. Bronn with the third edition of the Lethaea geognostica (1851–56), and subsequently he labored on an enlarged and revised edition, of which he published one section, Lethaea palaeozoica (1876–1883). In 1862 he was called on to superintend the preparation of a geological map of Upper Silesia, and the results of his researches were embodied in his Geologie von Oberschlesien (3 vols., 1870). As a mineralogist he was likewise well known, more particularly by his practical teachings and by the collection he formed in the Museum at Breslau. He died at Breslau on 14 December 1891.

His brother, Friedrich Adolph Roemer, was also a geologist.
