= Clausthal-Zellerfeld =

Place in Lower Saxony, Germany

- Town
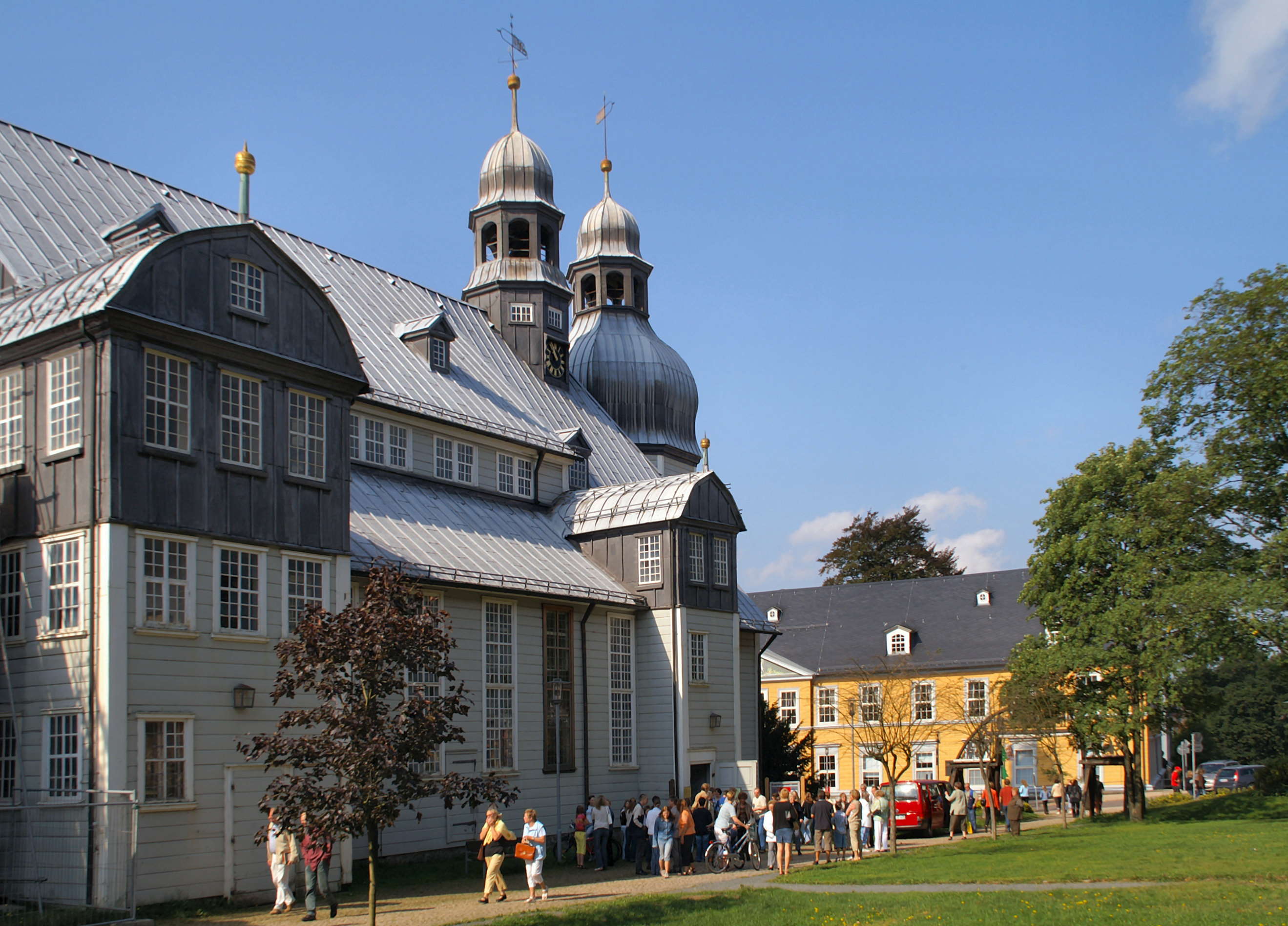
- Church in 2005

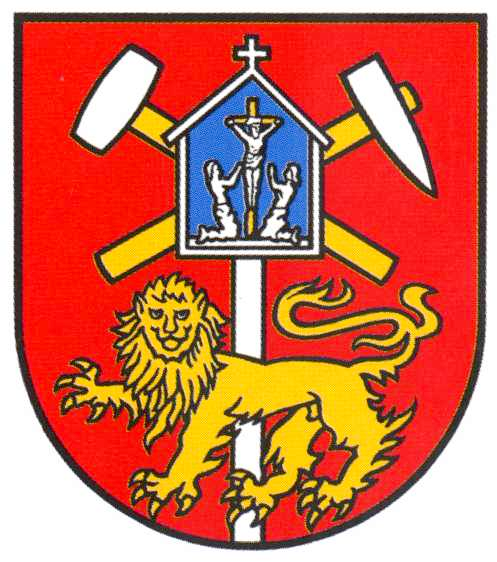
- Coat of arms

- Location of Clausthal-Zellerfeld within Goslar district
- Interactive map of Clausthal-Zellerfeld
- Location within Germany Location within Lower Saxony
- Coordinates: 51°48′18″N 10°20′08″E
- Country: Germany
- State: Lower Saxony
- District: Goslar
- Subdivisions: 4 districts

Government
  - Mayor (2021–26): Petra Emmerich-Kopatsch (SPD)

Area
  - Total: 43.69 km^{2} (16.87 sq mi)
- Elevation: 560 m (1,840 ft)

Population (2025-12-31)
  - Total: 13,501
  - Density: 309.0/km^{2} (800.4/sq mi)
- Time zone: UTC+01:00 (CET)
  - Summer (DST): UTC+02:00 (CEST)
- Postal codes: 38678
- Dialling codes: 05323
- Vehicle registration: GS, BRL, CLZ
- Website: www.clausthal-zellerfeld.de

Clausthal-Zellerfeld (German pronunciation: [ˈklaʊstaːlˈtsɛlɐfɛlt]) is a town in Lower Saxony, Germany. It is located in the southwestern part of the Harz mountains. Its population is approximately 15,000. The town hosts the Clausthal University of Technology. The health resort is located in the Upper Harz at an altitude between 390 and 821 m above sea level.

== Geography ==
Clausthal-Zellerfeld is located on the Upper Harz Plateau. The surrounding area is less mountainous compared to most of the Harz. As a result, the adjacent area is less wooded and there is more pasture land. Scattered in and around Clausthal-Zellerfeld are numerous dams and streams belonging to the Upper Harz Water Regale.

The depression between Clausthal and Zellerfeld marks a natural "borderline".

Southwest extends the "Small Clausthal valley".

=== City districts ===
- Altenau-Schulenberg im Oberharz (since 2015)
- Buntenbock (since 1972)
- Clausthal-Zellerfeld
- Wildemann (since 2015)

== History ==
Clausthal-Zellerfeld originally consisted of two towns which were merged in 1924 to form an administrative unit. Clausthal is well known for the old Clausthal University of Technology and its magnificent buildings, while Zellerfeld is a typical tourist resort for hikers and winter sportsmen. Clausthal-Zellerfeld is the largest town in the area that is situated in the mountains rather than on the edge.

Mining in the area began in the 16th century. Modern wire rope was invented to service the iron mines in the 1830s by the German mining engineer Wilhelm Albert in the years between 1831 and 1834 for use in mining in the Harz Mountains in Clausthal. It was quickly accepted because it proved superior to ropes made of hemp or to metal chains, such as had been used before and soon found its way into diverse applications, including most notably, suspension bridges. The Innerste Valley Railway was inaugurated in 1877 and extended to Altenau in 1914. The large station building and 70 other buildings in the town were destroyed in an air raid on 7 October 1944. 92 people lost their lives.

Mining activity halted in 1930 because the ore deposits were exhausted. Today, there are large remains of mines in the surrounding Harz region, some of which are now museums. The railway line was closed in 1976. The former railway station, which was rebuilt from 1961–1963 after being destroyed in 1944, houses the tourist information and the municipal library today.

The Clausthal University of Technology was established in 1775 for the education of mining engineers. Today, it is a technical university for teaching engineering, natural science (especially chemistry, materials science and physics), computer science and business studies.

Historical population
Year	Pop.	±%
1821	11,757	—
1848	14,739	+25.4%
1871	14,080	−4.5%
1885	13,917	−1.2%
1905	13,758	−1.1%
1925	12,973	−5.7%
1933	11,855	−8.6%
1939	11,788	−0.6%
1946	15,786	+33.9%
1950	17,643	+11.8%
1956	15,585	−11.7%
1961	15,849	+1.7%
1968	16,468	+3.9%
1970	15,714	−4.6%
1975	16,690	+6.2%
1980	16,270	−2.5%
1985	16,250	−0.1%
1990	17,061	+5.0%
1995	16,703	−2.1%
2000	15,413	−7.7%
2005	15,075	−2.2%
2010	14,579	−3.3%
2011	12,798	−12.2%
2012	12,772	−0.2%
2013	12,923	+1.2%

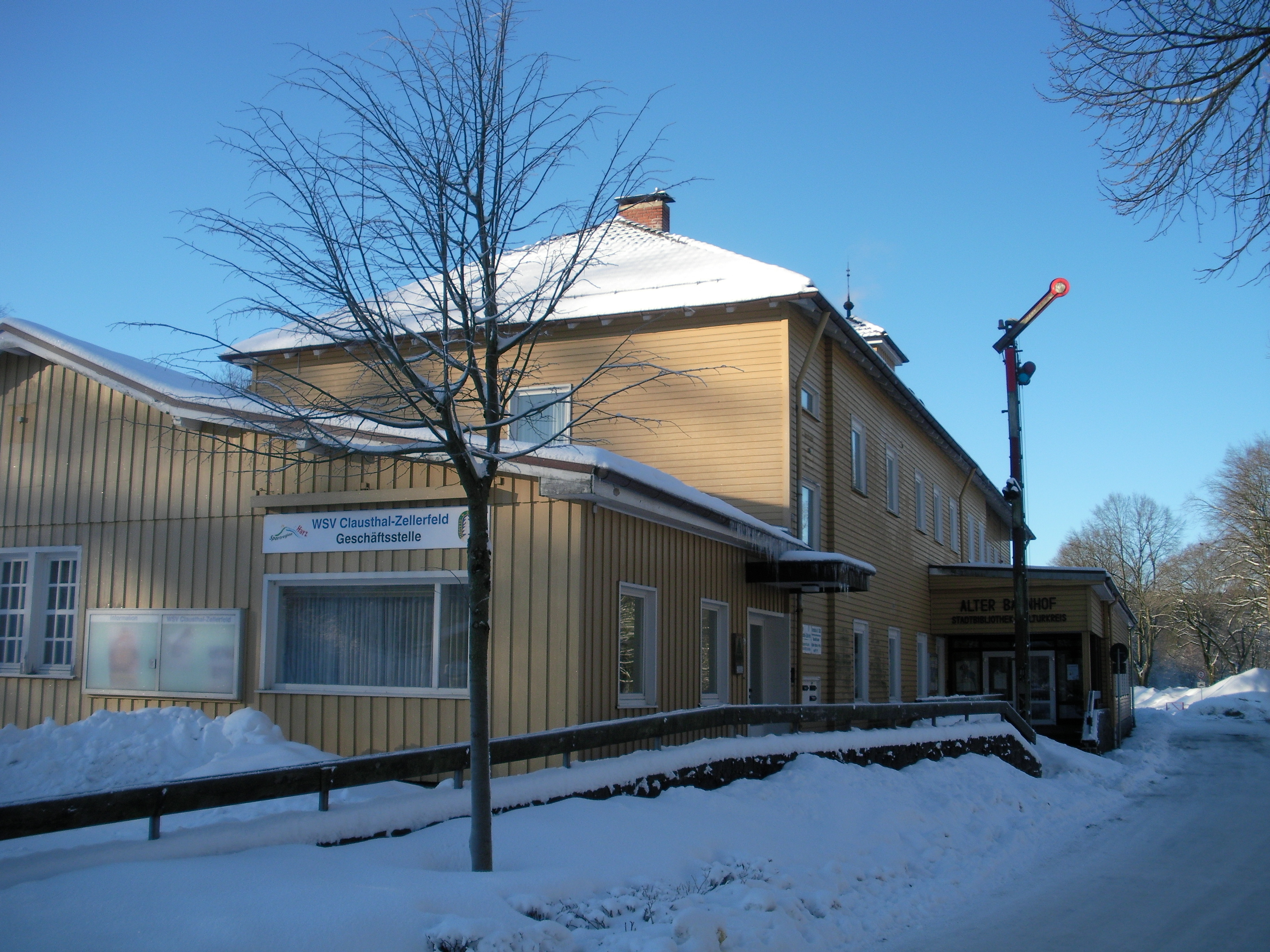
Former railway station

== Politics ==
=== Town council ===
2006 local elections:

- SPD: 19 seats
- CDU: 9 seats
- FDP: 3 seats
- UWG: 2 seats (independent electors community)

== Culture and sights ==
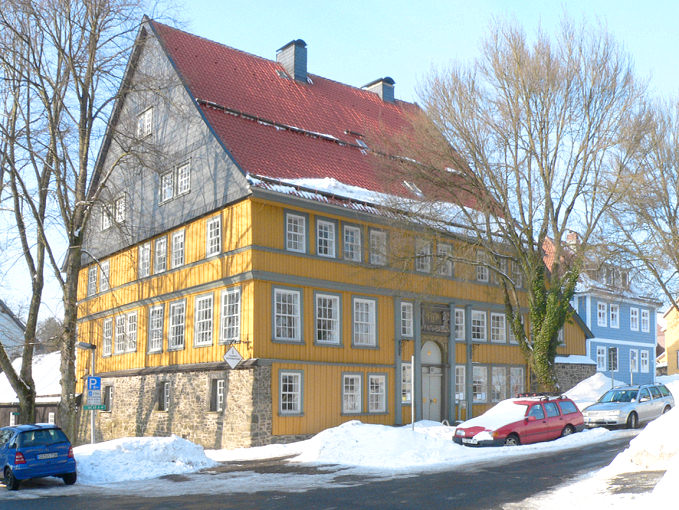
Dietzel House dating from 1674, which now also houses the tourist information office

- Oberharzer Wasserwirschaft (Upper Harz Water Management)

=== Museums ===
- Upper Harz Mining Museum
- GeoMuseum of Clausthal University of Technology

=== Buildings ===
- Plants of Upper Harz Water Regale
- Market Church in Clausthal, the largest wooden church in Germany with 2,200 seats, built 1639-42. Tower dating from 1637.
- Old pharmacy Bergapotheke in Zellerfeld, built in 1674, with wood carvings
- Protestant Salvator Church in Zellerfeld, built 1674-83
- Clausthal mint (1617–1849)
- Oberbergamt building in Clausthal, built 1726-30
- Dietzel House in Zellerfeld, dating from 1674
- Former railway station, destroyed 1944 and rebuilt 1961-63
- House where Robert Koch was born

== Infrastructure ==
The retail trade is mostly located in the main center around Adolph-Roemer-Straße in the Clausthal district. Small-scale retail can be found in the side center in the Zellerfeld district. At the beginning of 2000, an area at the former Ostbahnhof was designated as a special location for large-scale retail. Further supermarkets can be found at the northern exit of Zellerfeld. Overall, the retail trade in the former mountain town is not very well developed and is now suffering from the general decline in shops.

The development of the Clausthal University of Technology is of great importance for the mining town of Clausthal-Zellerfeld, as it increases innovative investments. The development of the TU Clausthal and the cooperation between local companies and science is an advantage for the business location.

In addition to the usual craft businesses, there is a relatively large window factory as well as several companies spun off from the Clausthal University of Technology or CUTEC, which specialize primarily in particle measurement technology in testing technology.

Tourism is another important branch of the economy in Clausthal-Zellerfeld, but above all in its districts Altenau, Buntenbock, Schulenberg and Wildemann.

=== Traffic ===
From 1877 to 1976, the Langelsheim–Altenau (Oberharz) railway ran trains from the station to Altenau and Langelsheim. Today the public transport is served by several bus lines that travel to Goslar, Osterode am Harz, Altenau and Sankt Andreasberg.

=== Public facilities ===
- State Office for Mining, Energy and Geology with the Lower Saxony Mountain Archive
- CUTEC, Clausthal Environmental Technology Research Center
- State Construction Management South Lower Saxony
- Local fire brigades in the districts Altenau, Clausthal- Zellerfeld, Buntenbock, Schulenberg and Wildemann

=== Education ===
In addition to the primary and secondary school facilities, Clausthal-Zellerfeld also houses the School of Economics and Technology and the Clausthal University of Technology. The facilities of the TU are concentrated on the Feldgraben area campus as well as distributed in the Clausthal city area and on the Tannenhöhe.

Primary school:

- Clausthal primary school
- Wildemann primary school (privat school)
- Elementary school Zellerfeld

Further Training

- Gymnasium Robert Koch School (open all-day school)
- Clausthal-Zellerfeld secondary and secondary school

== Persons ==
=== People from Clausthal-Zellerfeld ===
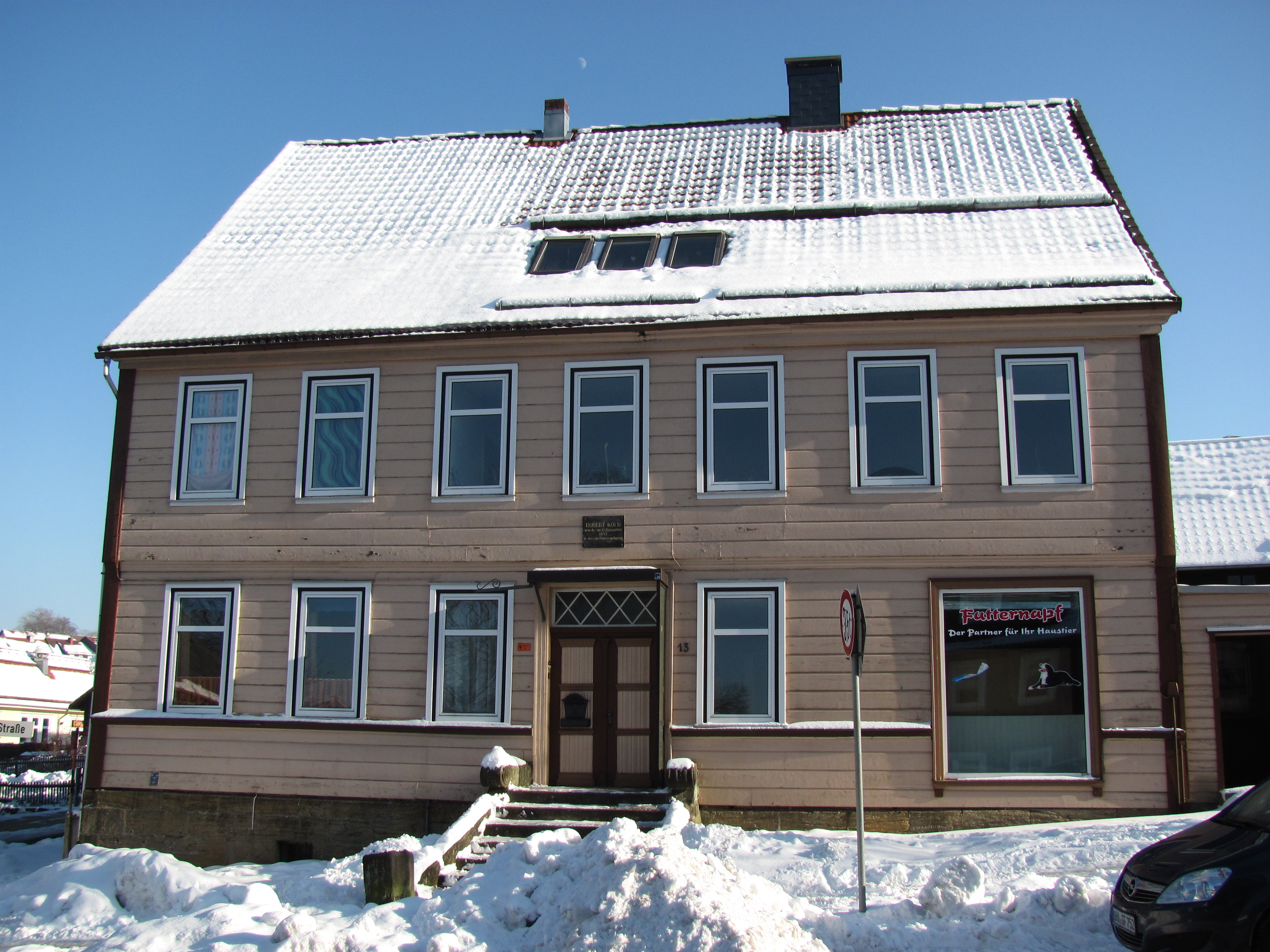
House where Robert Koch was born

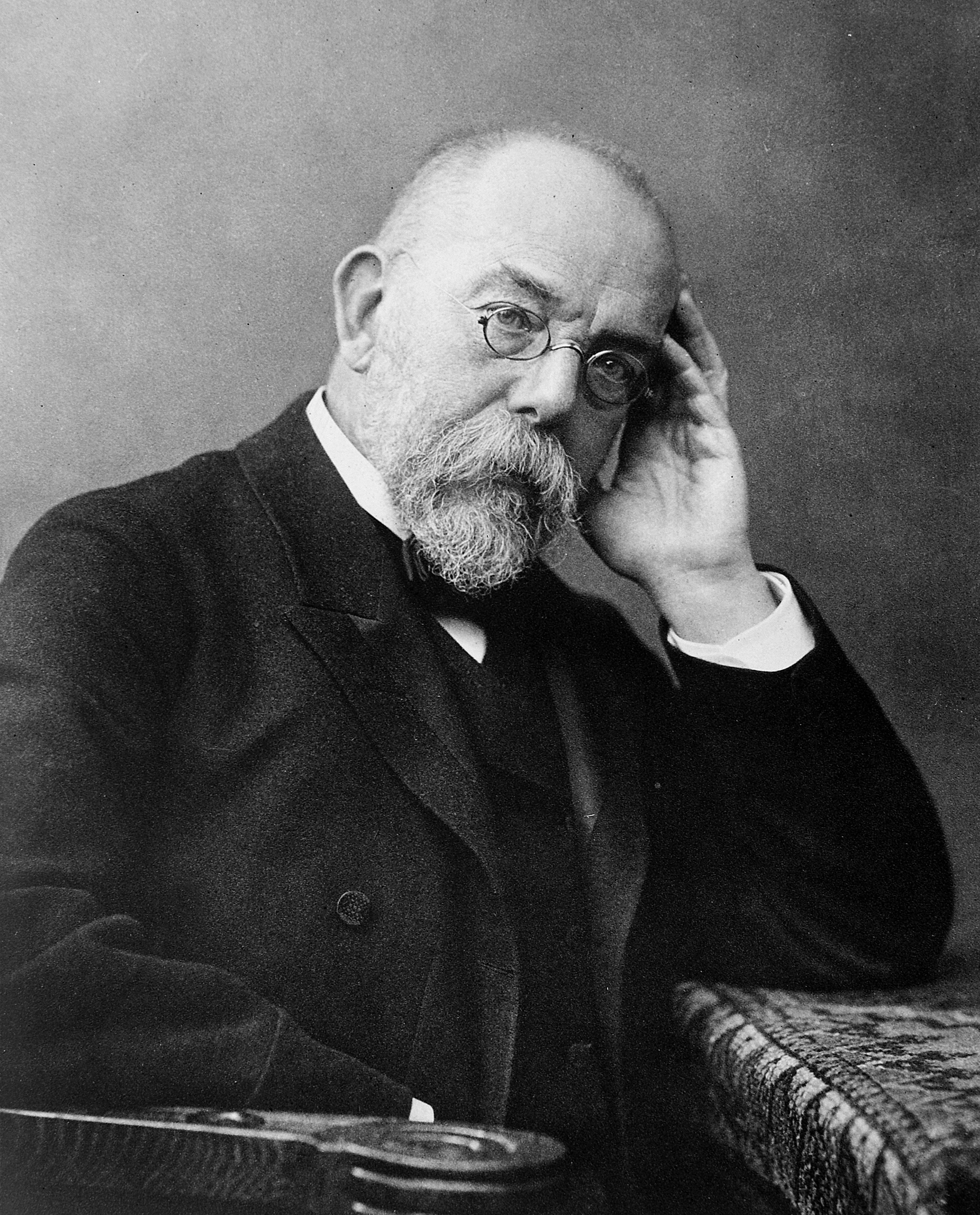
Robert Koch

- Bernhard Christoph Breitkopf (1695-1777), printer and publisher
- Heinrich Halfeld (1797-1873), engineer
- Carl Adolf Riebeck (1821-1883), industrialist and mining entrepreneur
- Robert Koch (1843–1910), microbiologist and Nobel Laureate
- Otto Erich Hartleben (1864–1905), poet and dramatist
- Otto Mejer (1888-1959), journalist
- Robert Förster (1913-1984), diplomat
- Helmut Sander (1920-1988), mayor of Goslar
- Reinhard Roder (born 1941), former football player for Leverkusen, manager for Tennis Borussian Berlin
- Dietrich Grönemeyer (born 1952), physician
- Daniel Böhm (born 1986), biathlete, Silver Olympic Medalist in 2014

=== Notable people associated with Clausthal-Zellerfeld ===
- Georg Philipp Telemann (1681–1767), composer

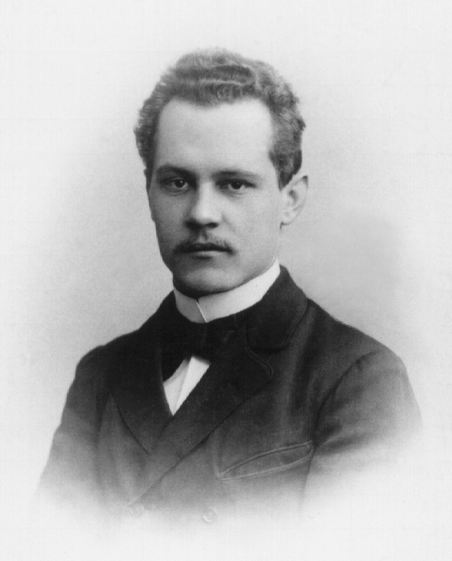
Arnold Sommerfeld 1897

- Johann Friedrich Ludwig Hausmann (1782–1859), mineralogist
- Wilhelm Albert (1787–1846), mining administrator and inventor
- Friedrich Adolph Roemer (1809–1869), geologist
- Arnold Sommerfeld (1868–1951), theoretical physicist
- Helmut Kleinicke (1907-1979), engineer at Auschwitz concentration camp who saved Jews during the Holocaust

== International relations ==
=== Twin towns – Sister cities ===
Clausthal-Zellerfeld is twinned with:

- L'Aigle, France

== Gallery ==
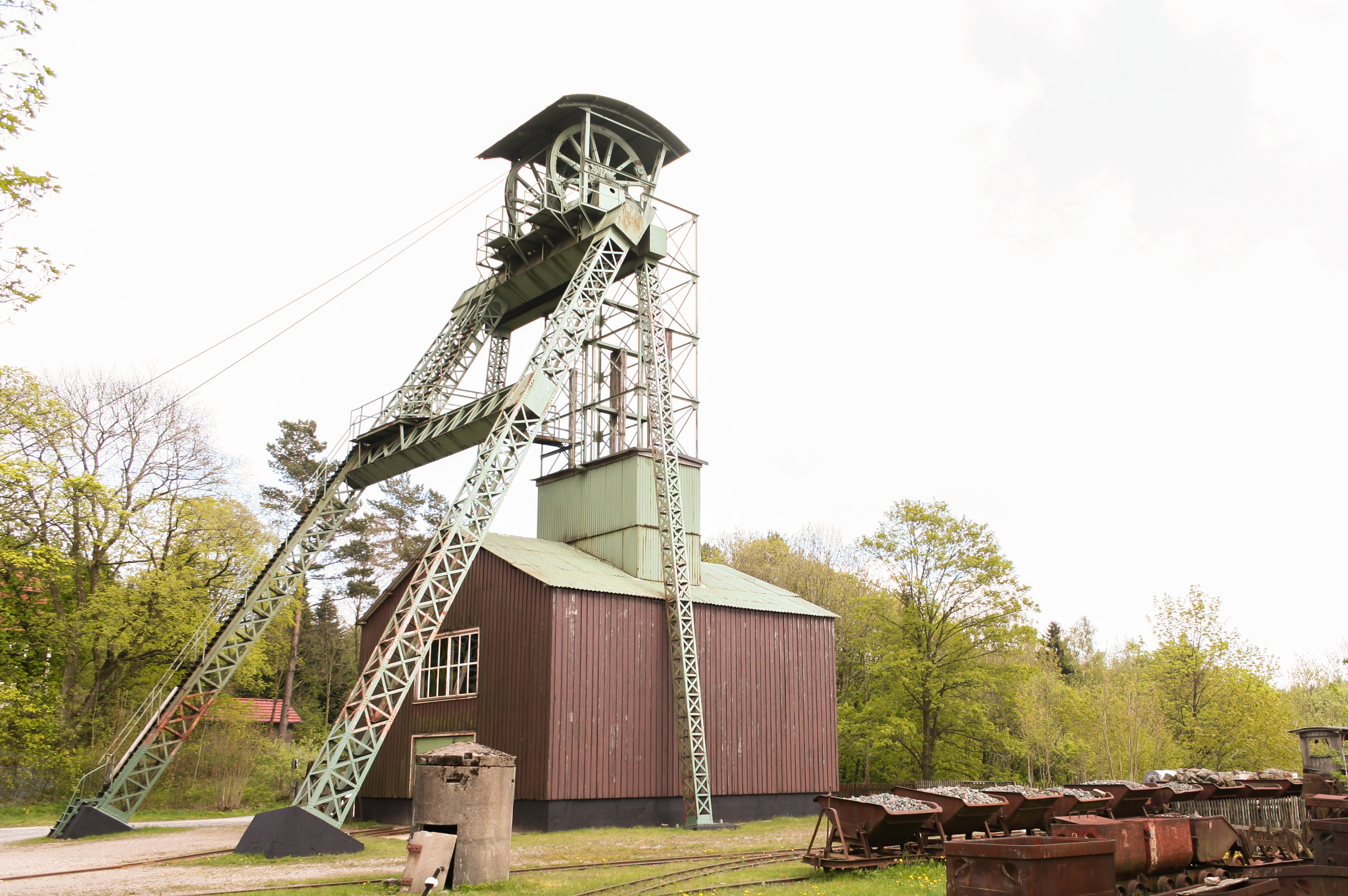
Steel headframe of Ottiliae shaft; Clausthal-Zellerfeld. This is the oldest still-existing headframe in Germany, built in 1876

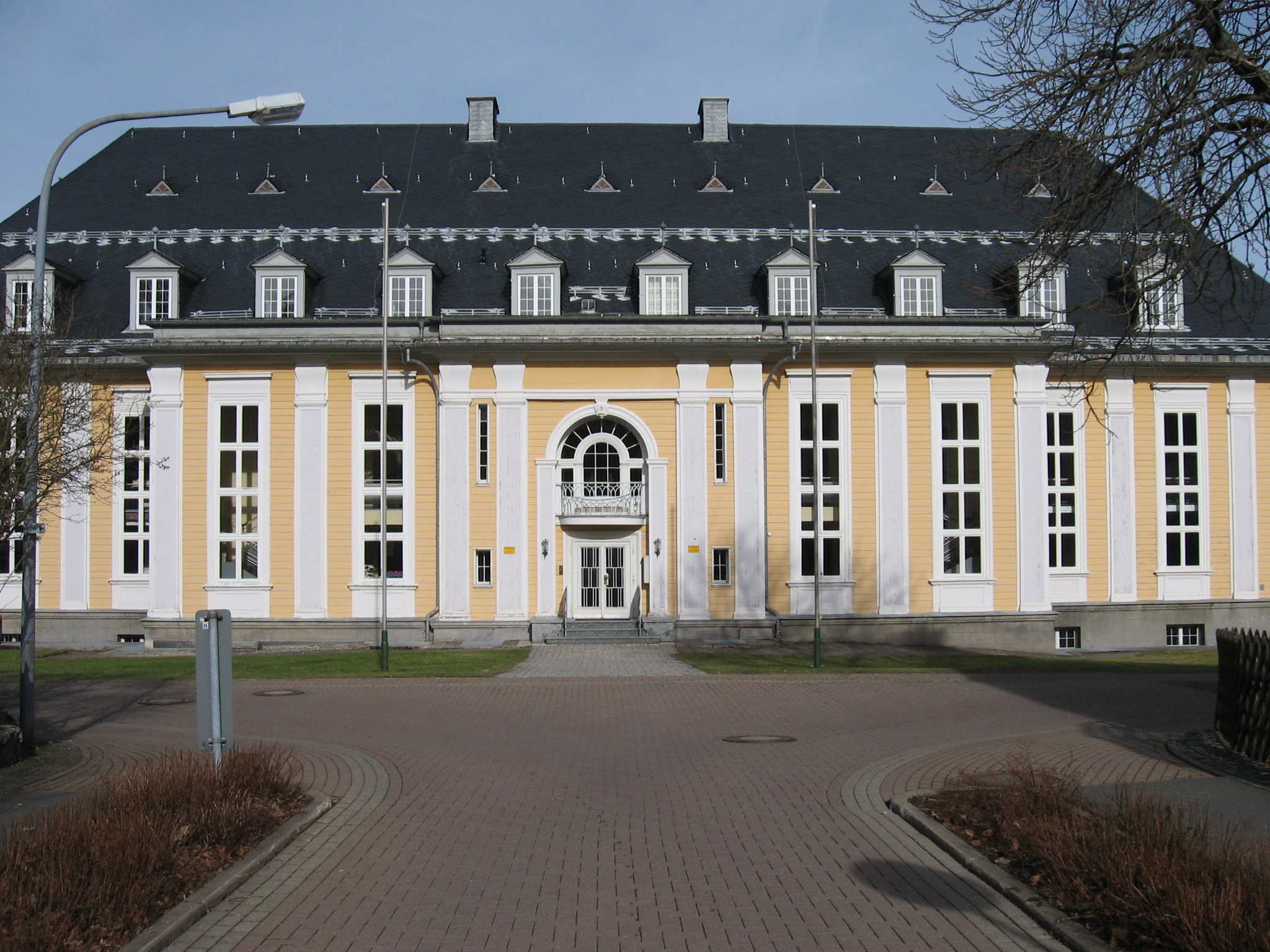
Aula Academica

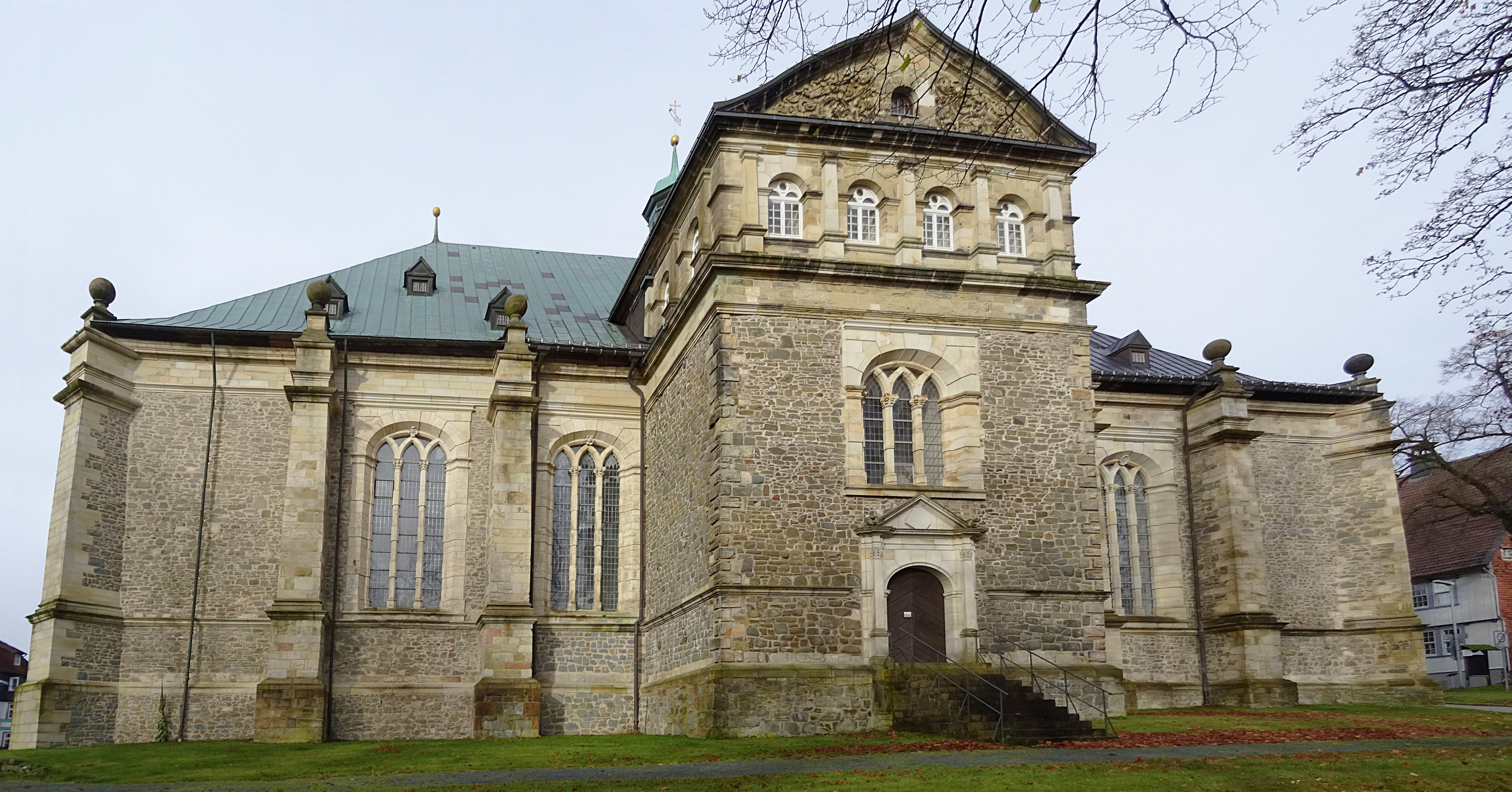
Salvatoris church

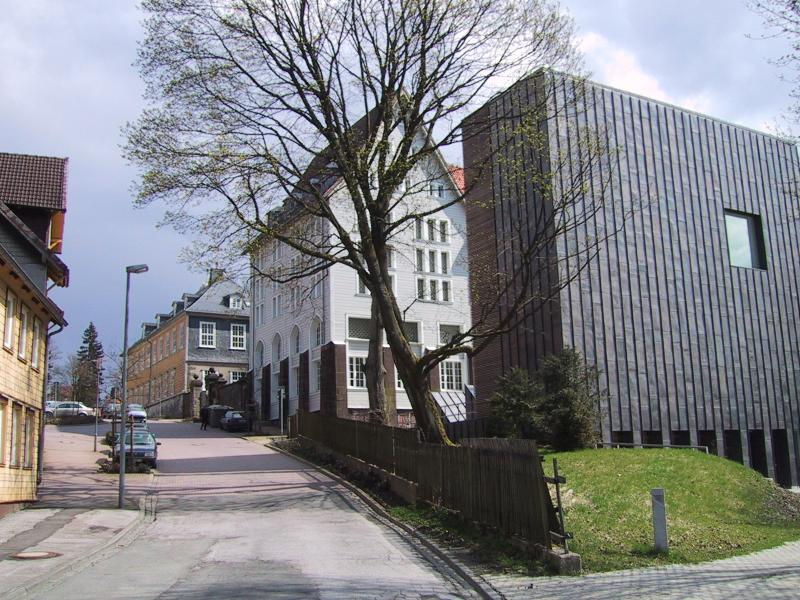
Mining Office

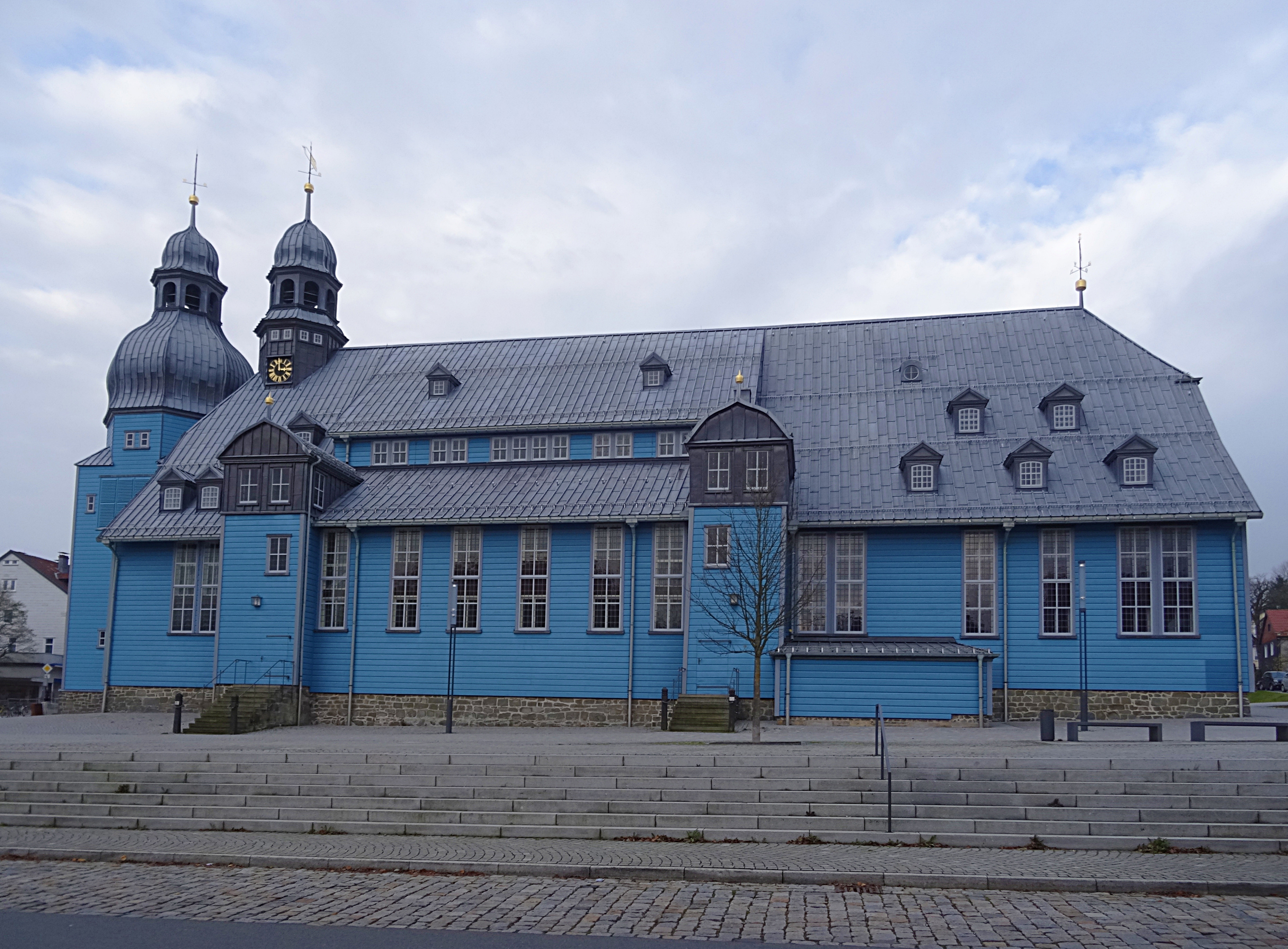
View on Marktkirche
