= Clausthal University of Technology =

German university

- Technische Universität Clausthal
- TU Clausthal historic seal
- Type: Public
- Established: 1775; 251 years ago
- Budget: EUR 122.2 million (2019)
- Rector: Joachim Schachtner
- Academic staff: 85
- Administrative staff: 1050
- Students: 4,093
- Location: Clausthal-Zellerfeld, Lower Saxony, Germany; 51°48′17″N 10°20′04″E
- Colours: Green
- Website: www.tu-clausthal.de/en/

The Clausthal University of Technology (German: Technische Universität Clausthal, also referred to as TU Clausthal or TUC) is an institute of technology (Technische Universität) in Clausthal-Zellerfeld, Lower Saxony, Germany. The small public university is regularly ranked among the Top German universities in engineering by CHE University Rankings. More than 30% of students and 20% of academic staff come from abroad, making it one of the most international universities in Germany. The university is best known for the prominent corporate leaders among its former students.

== History ==
The academy of the local Hanoverian mining authority was established in 1775 at Clausthal in the Harz mountain range with its centuries-long history of mining in the Upper Harz (most notably at the Rammelsberg). Initially a school for pitmen and smelter workers, it was raised to the status of a mining college by the Westphalian minister Count Hans von Bülow in 1810. In 1864, at the behest of King George V of Hanover, the spin-off of a mining academy (Bergakademie) was founded.

Both institutions remained under joint administration after the annexation of the Kingdom of Hanover by Prussia in 1866, until in 1906 the academy was separated as an autonomous educational establishment directly subordinate to the Prussian government represented by a curator. It was one of only two mining academies in Prussia, the other being the mining college in Berlin established in 1770, a predecessor of Technische Universität Berlin.

After World War II, the academy passed under the authority of the West German state of Lower Saxony, it was renamed Technische Hochschule in 1966 and Technische Universität in 1968.

In 2015, student numbers at Clausthal reached a high of almost 5000 students. However, since then this number has rapidly plummeted to around 3400.

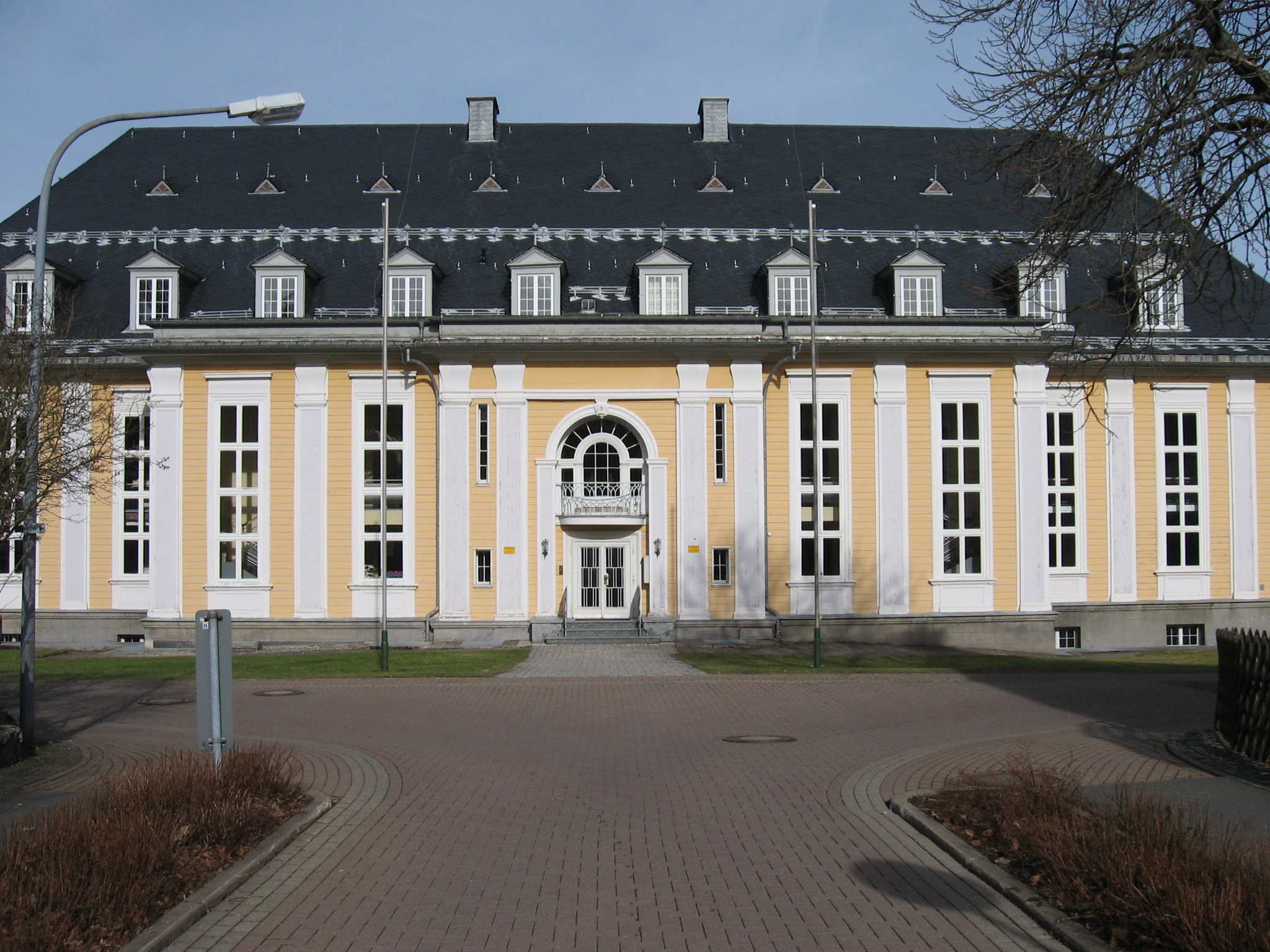
Auditorium

== Organization ==
The Faculty of Natural and Materials Sciences

- Institute of Inorganic and Analytical Chemistry
- Institute of Materials Science and Engineering
- Institute of Metallurgy
- Institute of Non-Metallic Materials
- Institute of Organic Chemistry
- Institute of Physical Chemistry
- Institute of Physics and Physical Technologies
- Institute of Polymer Materials and Plastics Engineering
- Institute of Technical Chemistry
- Institute of Theoretical Physics
- Laser Application Centre

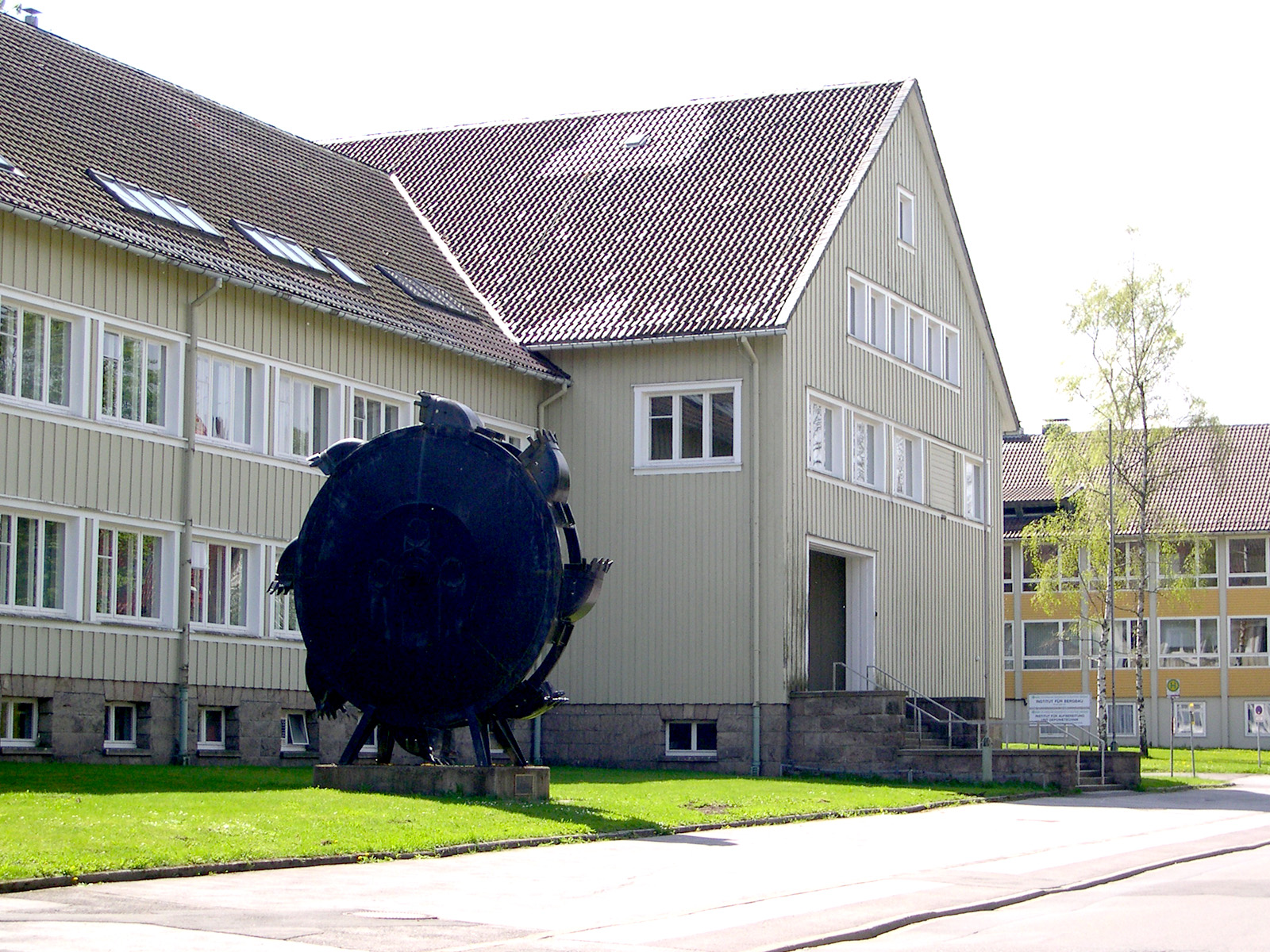
Institute of Mining

The Faculty of Energy and Economic Sciences

- Institute of Electrical Power Engineering and Energy Systems
- Institute of Energy Process Engineering and Fuel Technology
- Institute of Environmental Sciences
- Institute of Geology and Paleontology
- Institute of Geophysics
- Institute of Geotechnical Engineering and Mine Surveying
- Institute of German and International Mining and Energy Law
- Institute of Management and Economics
- Institute of Mineral and Waste Processing, Waste Disposal and Geomechanics
- Institute of Mineralogy and Mineral Resources
- Institute of Mining
- Institute of Subsurface Energy Systems

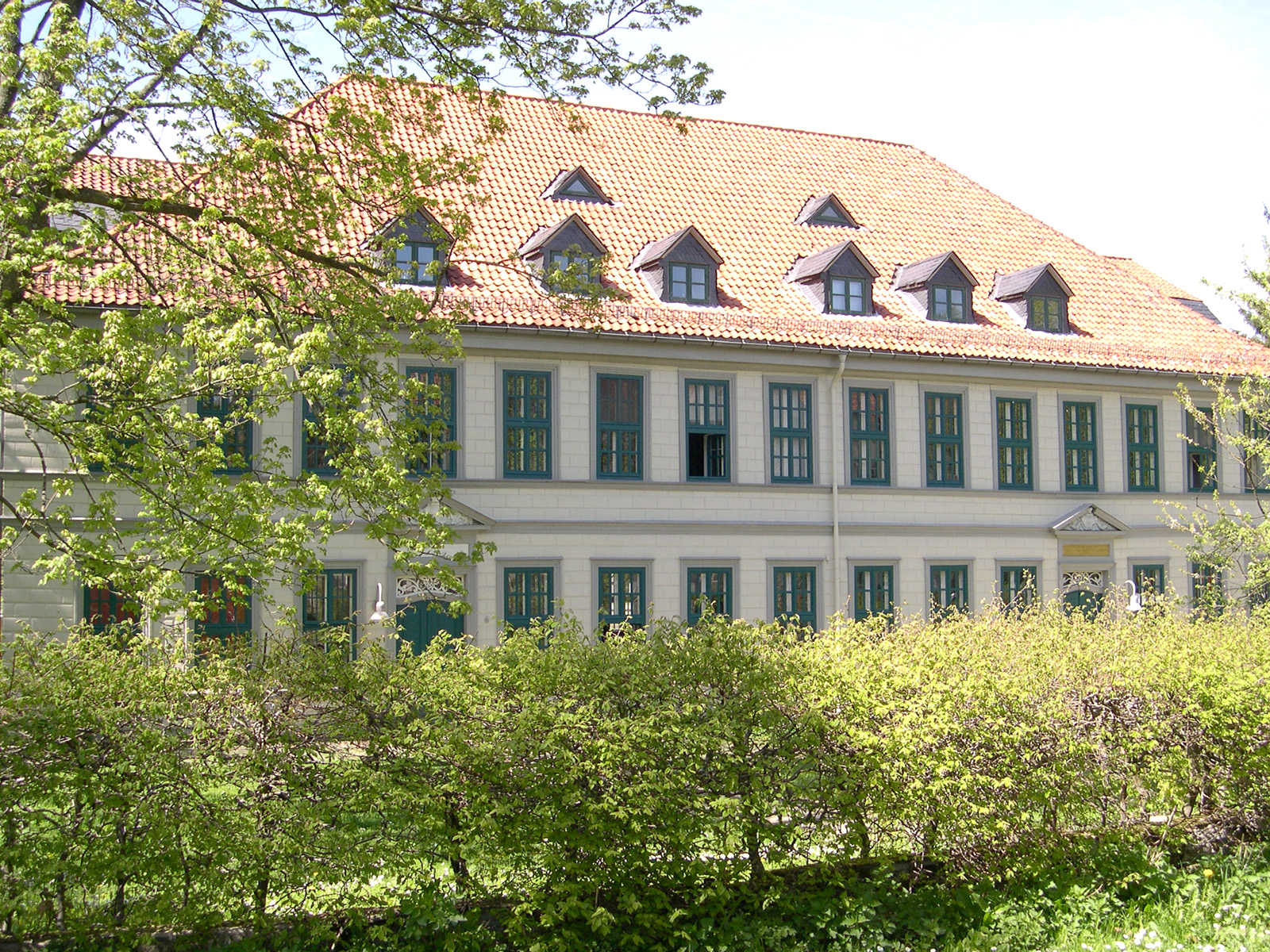
Students' hostel

The Faculty of Mathematics/Computer Sciences and Engineering

- Institute of Applied Mechanics
- Institute of Chemical and Electrochemical Process Engineering
- Institute of Computer Sciences
- Institute of Electrical Information Technology
- Institute of Mass Transfer
- Institute of Mathematics
- Institute of Mechanical Engineering
- Institute of Particle Technology
- Institute of Plant Engineering and Fatigue Analysis
- Institute of Process and Production Control Technology
- Institute of Tribology and Energy Conversion Machinery
- Institute of Welding and Machining

The Interdisciplinary Research Facilities

- Centre for Information Technology
- Centre for Polymers
- Centre for Simulation Technology
- DFG Research Centre "Fertigen in Feinblech"
- European Graduate School "Microstructural Control in Free-Radical Polymerization"
- Forum Clausthal
- Laser Application Centre

== Reputation ==
=== Ranking ===
- DIE ZEIT (CHE Ranking), 2012/2013: Top tier in Mechanical Engineering and Industrial Engineering.

The CHE-Ranking is the most comprehensive and most detailed university ranking in the German-speaking countries. It is published annually since 2005 by DIE ZEIT. Clausthal is placed regularly among the top universities in the majority of its engineering and sciences programs.

- WirtschaftsWoche, 2009: 5th among universities with the most alumni on the management boards of German corporate giants.

German business magazine WirtschaftsWoche researched the universities with the most alumni at the top of DAX-corporations. Clausthal was placed 5th, however in relation to the size of the student body, TUC came in first.

- Junge Karriere, 2008: 8th in Industrial Engineering and 11th in Mechanical Engineering

Junge Karriere, the career magazine of daily newspaper Handelsblatt conducted a ranking of German universities by interviewing over 51,000 students and graduates as well as over 1000 human resource managers. Handelsblatt is the largest newspaper on business and finance in Germany.

=== Unique features ===
TU Clausthal consistently has a very high percentage of international students, ranging from 25% to 38% over the last decade. The largest group of foreign nationals comes from the People's Republic of China (PRC), making up between 12% and 20% of total students. TUC has the highest percentage of Chinese students in Germany.

The popularity of TUC among Chinese nationals is derived from its reputation as one of the three "ABC-Universities". The abbreviation stands for Aachen, Berlin, and Clausthal and refers to RWTH Aachen University, Technische Universität Berlin and TU Clausthal. In China, these three Universities are regarded as Germany's leading Universities of Technology. Clausthal's reputation in China was further enhanced when former alumnus Wan Gang became the Chinese Minister for Science and Technology in 2007.

As a former mining academy, TU Clausthal is one of three universities in Germany (besides TU Freiberg and RWTH Aachen) that offers study programs in the fields of metals, mining, and petroleum engineering. In this regard, TUC was referred to as the "most renowned university for metallurgy" by Frankfurter Allgemeine Zeitung.

In relative terms, TU Clausthal is among the universities with the most alumni on the management boards of German blue chip corporations. Most recently, this included companies like RWE, ThyssenKrupp, K+S, HeidelbergCement, Aurubis, Eurasian Natural Resources Corporation and Jungheinrich.

== Student Life ==
=== Big Band ===
The "Big Band an der TU Clausthal e.V." was set up in the 2017/18 winter semester as a non-profit organization. The band was registered as a students' association at TU Clausthal. The 30 musicians are dedicated to jazz, swing, funk and pop music . Rehearsals of the "groovING TUC Big Band" named band are held every Friday during the whole year interrupted only by short summer and winter breaks. The band has own equipment like stage piano, bass saxophone, baritone saxophone, tenor saxophone, alto saxophone, soprano saxophone, bass trombone, tenor trombone, trumpet, flugelhorn, bass guitar with amplifier, electric guitars with amplifiers, electronic drum set, acoustic drum set, sound reinforcement system, and music stands which can be used by foreign students, students without own musical instruments, and for gigs.

The band leader Domenic Eggers, who has a teaching assignment at TU Clausthal, rehearses with the band classical jazz as well as jazzy pop pieces. The program developed in the rehearsals is presented in a concert at the end of each semester, to which admission is free and where only donations for the band are requested.

Currently, about two-thirds of the band members are from the university (including students from abroad) and one-third are from the region.

In 2018 the Big Band set up a smaller ensemble, the swingING TUC Jazz Combo, of four to eight members of the Big Band playing in variable instrumentation. The Jazz Combo regularly practices its own literature, mainly blues but also pop songs, right before the Big Band rehearsal. The swingING TUC Jazz Combo had its first gig in October 2018 at a TU Clausthal event. Since that time it had several performances at regional events.

Since 2021, the big band has organised an annual big band workshop with renowned jazz greats, in which external musicians can also participate. So far, these have included Frank Nowicky, Lutz Krajenski, Achim Kück and Monika Roscher.

A vocal ensemble to support the band was also formed by the Big Band and has been rehearsing since March 2020 under the direction of jazz vocal teacher Chiara Raimondi until she left the ensemble in summer 2021 to study in Italy.

=== Rock, pop and jazz choir at Clausthal University of Technology ===
In September 2021, the Big Band's vocal ensemble was expanded into the Clausthal University of Technology's Rock, Pop and Jazz Choir as a subdivision of the Big Band, after jazz singing teacher Chiara Raimondi left the vocal ensemble. More than 20 people responded to the big band's call to found the choir on 4 September 2021. After its foundation, the choir quickly grew to 35 members thanks to new members from the university and the region.

The choir is directed by André Wenauer from Hattorf am Harz and rehearses every Monday in the early evening. Under the name 'singING TUC Vocals', the modern choir rehearses music titles from the rock, pop and jazz genres and provides vocal support for the big band on vocal titles.

== Notable faculty and alumni ==
- Friedrich Adolph Roemer (1809–1869), geologist
- John O. Meusebach (1812–1897), bureaucrat, American farmer and politician
- Wilhelm Haarmann (1847–1931), chemist
- Arnold Sommerfeld (1868–1951), theoretical physicist
- Ernst Brandi (1875–1937), mining-engineer
- Sir Robert Nelson Kotzé (1895), South African government mining engineer, knighted for services.
- Wilhelm Biltz (1877–1943), chemist
- Paul Ramdohr (1890–1985), mineralogist
- Josef Goubeau (1901–1990), chemist
- Paul Dahlke (1904–1984), actor
- Ekkehard Schulz (born 1941), businessman
- Wan Gang (born 1952), automotive engineer and former minister of science and technology of China.
- Rudi Rubiandini (born 1962), former vice minister of energy and resource department, Indonesian petroleum professor, bureaucrat
- Ralf Seppelt (born 1969), mathematician

== See also ==
- Technische Universität Bergakademie Freiberg
- Education in Germany
