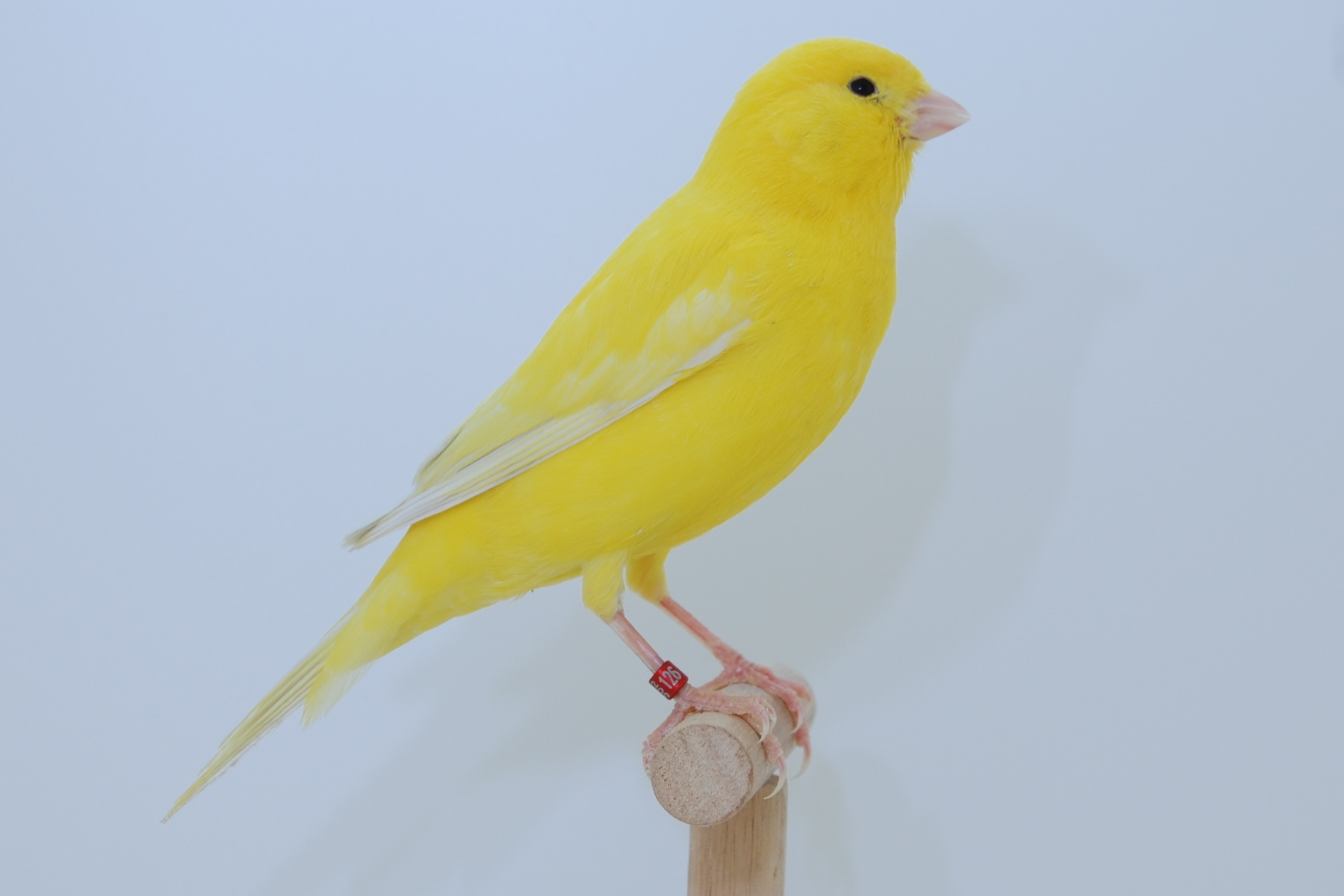
- A yellow domestic canary

Conservation status
- Domesticated

Scientific classification
- Kingdom: Animalia
- Phylum: Chordata
- Class: Aves
- Order: Passeriformes
- Family: Fringillidae
- Subfamily: Carduelinae
- Genus: Serinus
- Species: S. canaria
- Subspecies: S. c. domestica

Trinomial name
- Serinus canaria domestica (Linnaeus, 1758)

Synonyms
- Serinus canarius domesticus Linnaeus 1758, I. Geoffroy Saint-Hilaire, 1861

= Domestic canary =

Domesticated bird

The domestic canary (Serinus canaria forma domestica), often simply known as the canary, is a domesticated form and subspecies of the wild canary, a small songbird in the finch family originating in the Macaronesian Islands. Over the past 500 years of captivity, a wide variety of coloured, decorative and singing canaries have been bred through selection.

The canary has been kept as a pet for centuries, which began after the European conquests of the islands inhabited by its wild ancestor. They were domesticated and became prized possessions in 17th century Europe, eventually becoming popular even amongst poorer households, largely due to its melodious song and flexibility in breeding. They were also a highly popular pet in the United States from the 19th century until the mid 20th century. Sacrificial female canaries were formerly used in coal mines as a sentinel species, whose deaths there indicated the presence of carbon monoxide or other toxic gases.

Domestic canaries come in a wide variety of different plumage colours, unlike its wild ancestor which are usually grey or light green. The most well-known, stereotypical plumage colour of canaries is bright yellow, which has even given a name to a specific shade of yellow referred to as Canary Yellow. Singing canaries are the only pets whose voice and vocalisations have been influenced by humans to alter their sounds. The Harz Roller breed of singing canary has achieved wide fame in this field.

== Description ==
The domestic canary is a domesticated form of its wild ancestor, which are named after Spain's Canary Islands. Common canaries are approximately 5 inches (13 cm) to 6 inches (15 cm) long, and weigh approximately 15 grams (0.53 oz) to 20 grams (0.71 oz). There are decorative canaries that range from 4 inches (10 cm) (e.g. the Fife Fancy) to 9 inches (23 cm) (e.g. the Lancashire) long. The canary is distinguished by the harmonious shape of the finch - a round, formed head and a short, pin-shaped beak.

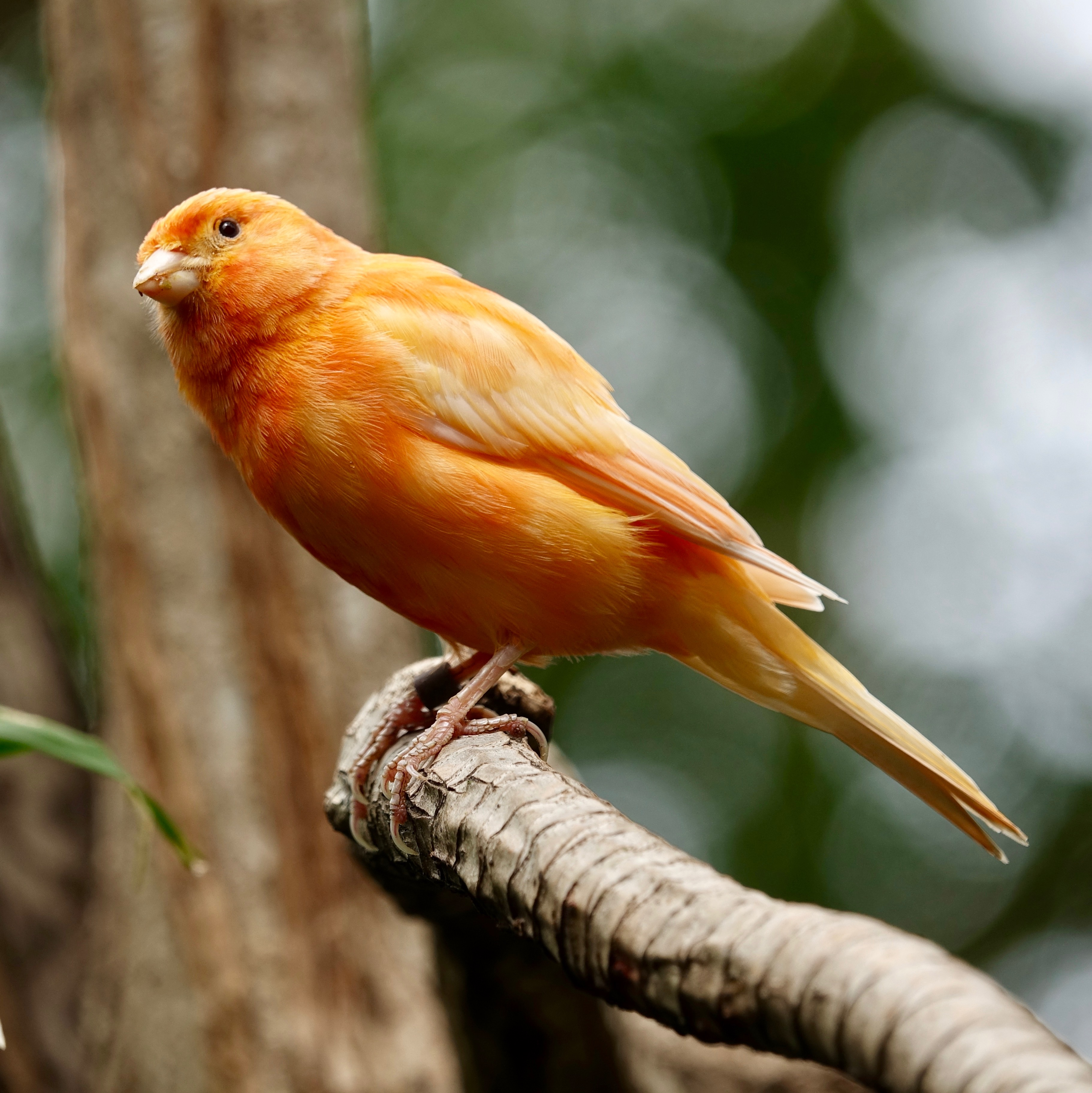
A domestic canary at a conservatory

Given proper housing and care, a canary's lifespan ranges from 7 to 12, or 10 to 15 years. Typically, the domestic canary is kept as a cage and aviary bird. The cage is placed in a well-lit place, but not in the sun (unless in winter), not on a window, and not in a draft. It enjoys some year-round sun, although in some warm regions it can die if kept in sunny areas without filtered shade. It should be wide enough to allow them to jump and fly around. The bottom of the cage should be cleaned regularly to prevent disease. Canaries can be housed together in an aviary during their resting period outside of the breeding season. They regularly require a water dish for bathing themselves, and need their nails clipped once in a while, although with extra care to prevent injury. Toys provide mental and physical stimulation: canaries enjoy mirrors, bells that make sound, leather straps and swings and ladders. Colour-bred canaries may have specific care requirements like diet to preserve their plumage colours annually. The quality and activity of singing, reproduction, and longevity of the bird depend on the correct maintenance and care of the bird.

Being a monomorphic species, it is difficult to determine the sex of canaries by their appearance or colour intensity. A key fact is that most males sing, while most females do not, and those females who do sing won't produce the intensity and loudness of the male's. Canary keepers have used various unpublished methods to determine the sex, one theory being that the beak line and eye alignment differs, although even experienced breeders have mistyped the sex. Genital differences may be observed around the cloaca of a canary, but these are only noticeable around the peak of the breeding season.

== Behaviour ==
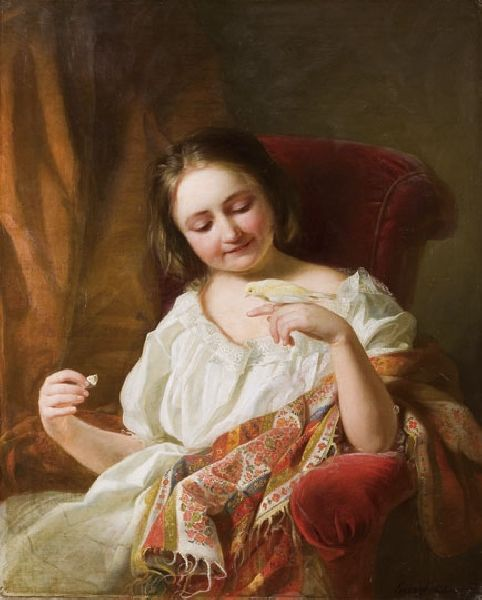
A tamed canary interacting with a human depicted on Little Girl with Canary by Györgyi, 1853

Male canaries sing to attract mates and establish territory and begin singing early in the morning. The light cycle has a direct effect on a canary's singing quality. Most females do not sing, but would still chirp. Research has suggested that males may use techniques singing certain notes that females would find particularly attractive. When canaries want to express mutual affection, they peck at each other; extensive mutual preening, as we know it from finches, is not common in canaries. Canaries communicate through calls and song. They respond to the warning calls of other birds, meaning they understand sounds unrelated to their species. When excited, canaries may jump from perch to perch in a cage or express it through various chirping sounds.

The canary is a solitary bird, introverted in human terms, and they are normally comfortable living alone in a cage. They are not hands-on with humans and tend to be skittish around them. While by no means as tame as budgies and companion parrots, they can still, with patience, be tamed and trained to the point where they would willingly approach humans and sit on their hands or shoulders. German royal courts during the 18th century were noted to have had sensory closeness and emotional bonds with canaries. Tips were circulated on how to accustom the canaries to come and sit on a person's hand or fingers.

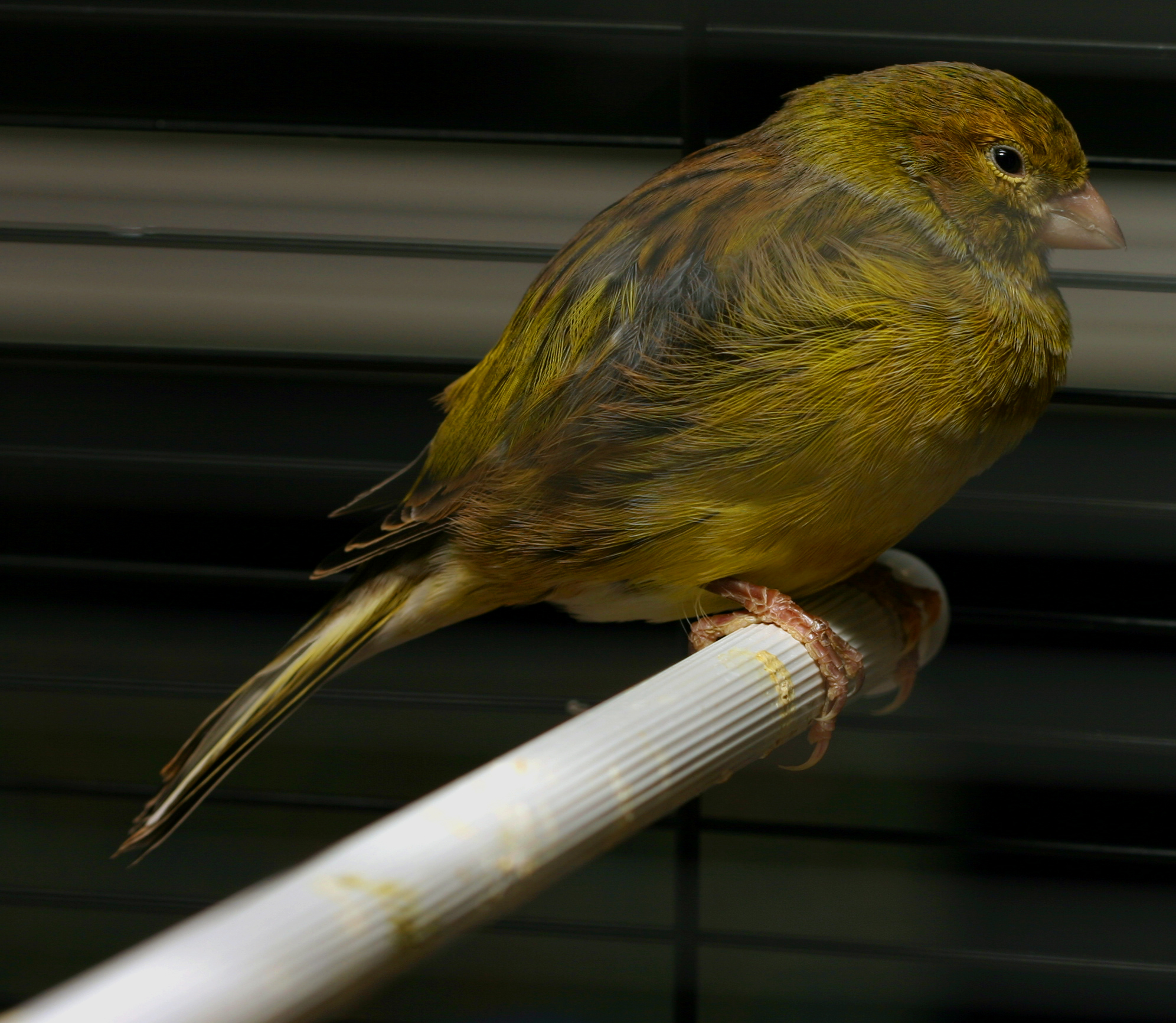
A canary sitting on its perch at night

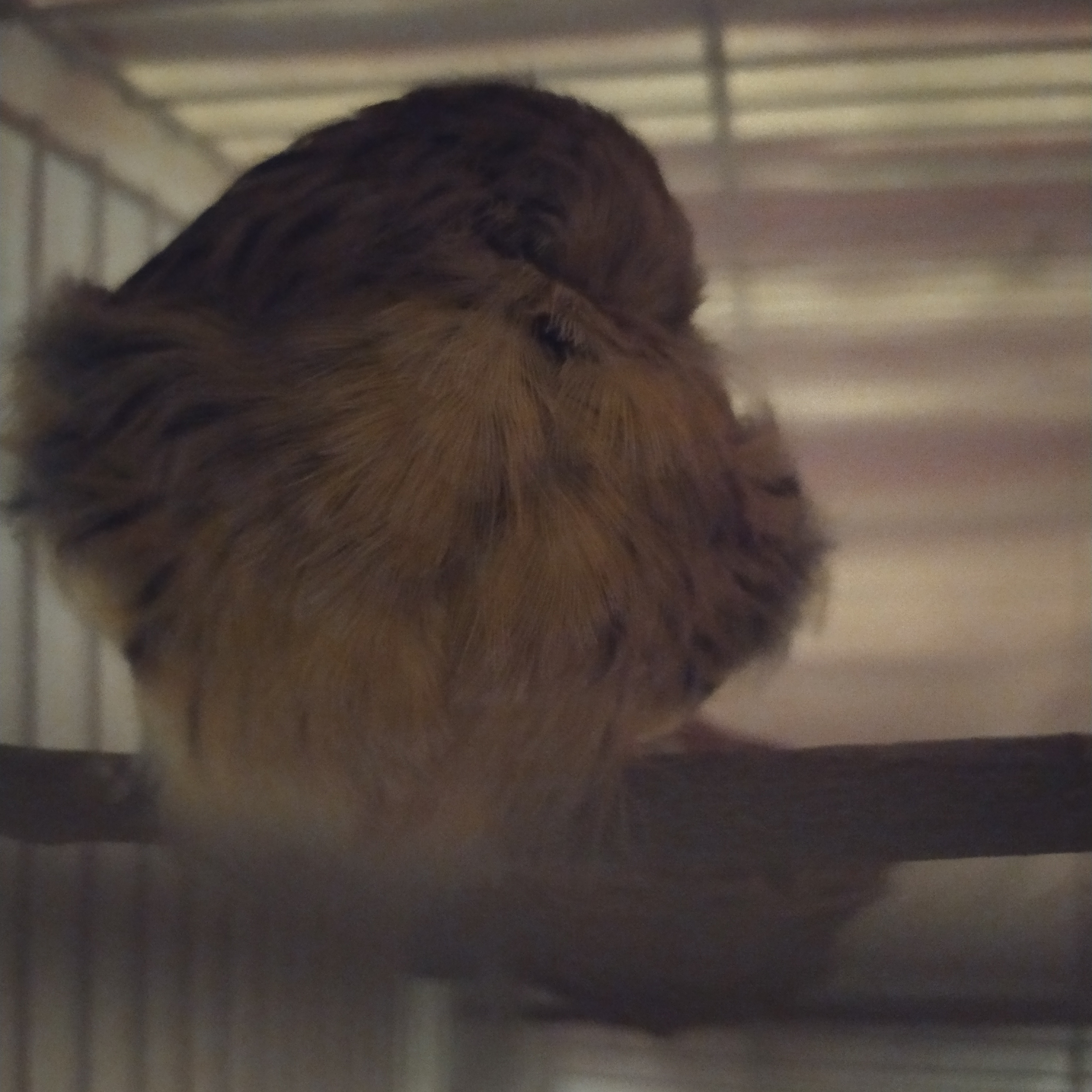
Sleeping canary

Moulting occurs between August and October (Northern Hemisphere), during the longer days of summer, and has full plumage for finding a mate and breeding during the shorter days of autumn and winter. During the longer summer days it is not unusual for the male canary to stop singing as new feathers are developing. Healthy birds shed their plumage within six to eight weeks. Young birds shed only their small feathers during their first year. Birds that are not fed and cared for optimally can be particularly vulnerable and health-stable during the moulting season. This can lead to a winter or spring moult.

A canary can be territorial when living together with other canaries or similar sized birds. Canaries always maintain an individual distance from one another, which even paired partners consistently maintain and defend. Outside of the breeding season, canaries are peaceful and sociable birds and can be kept as a group in an aviary during this time. In an aviary, a hierarchy is established within the group, after which disputes rarely arise and most fights are over coveted food or a preferred perch. Often, the fight is limited to mutual threats, after which the weaker bird gives up. They usually express threats with open beaks and raised wings. During the breeding season, the males establish territories and often defend them fiercely. This can lead to beak fights and chases that could be bloody. Therefore, multiple males should not be kept in one aviary during this time.

== Biology ==
=== Reproduction ===
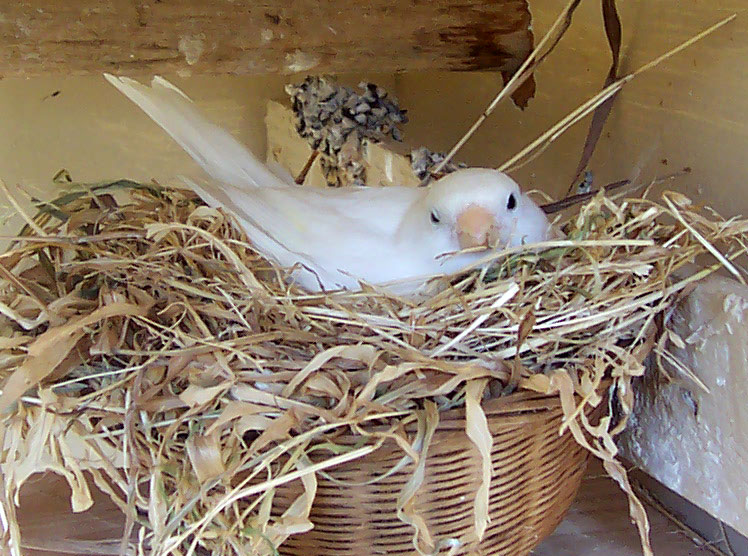
A white canary nesting

The canary's breeding season begins in spring. Males intensify their singing and also engage in chases and beak fights against rivals. The female frequently emits a trilling mating call and flaps her wings. She is constantly on the move. If the female is broody, she takes nesting material in her beak and searches for a suitable nesting site (nest-building ceremony). Mating lasts one to two seconds.

The female builds the nest in nesting supports in the form of baskets or semi-open nesting boxes. Canaries will use any materials provided by the bird keeper; suitable natural materials may include grass blades, moss, animal hair, wool and feathers, or special nesting materials such as coconut fibre, wood shavings (for the nest base), and lint (for lining the nest). While building the nest, the male sings continuously and feeds his female.

Once the female has completed her nest she lays the first egg, almost always early in the morning. Canaries often begin incubating immediately after laying their first egg. With canaries, it is common for the female to incubate alone and not be relieved by the male. She leaves the nest several times a day to defecate and drink. The rest of the time, the male provides the female with food from his crop. The incubation period lasts about 14 days.

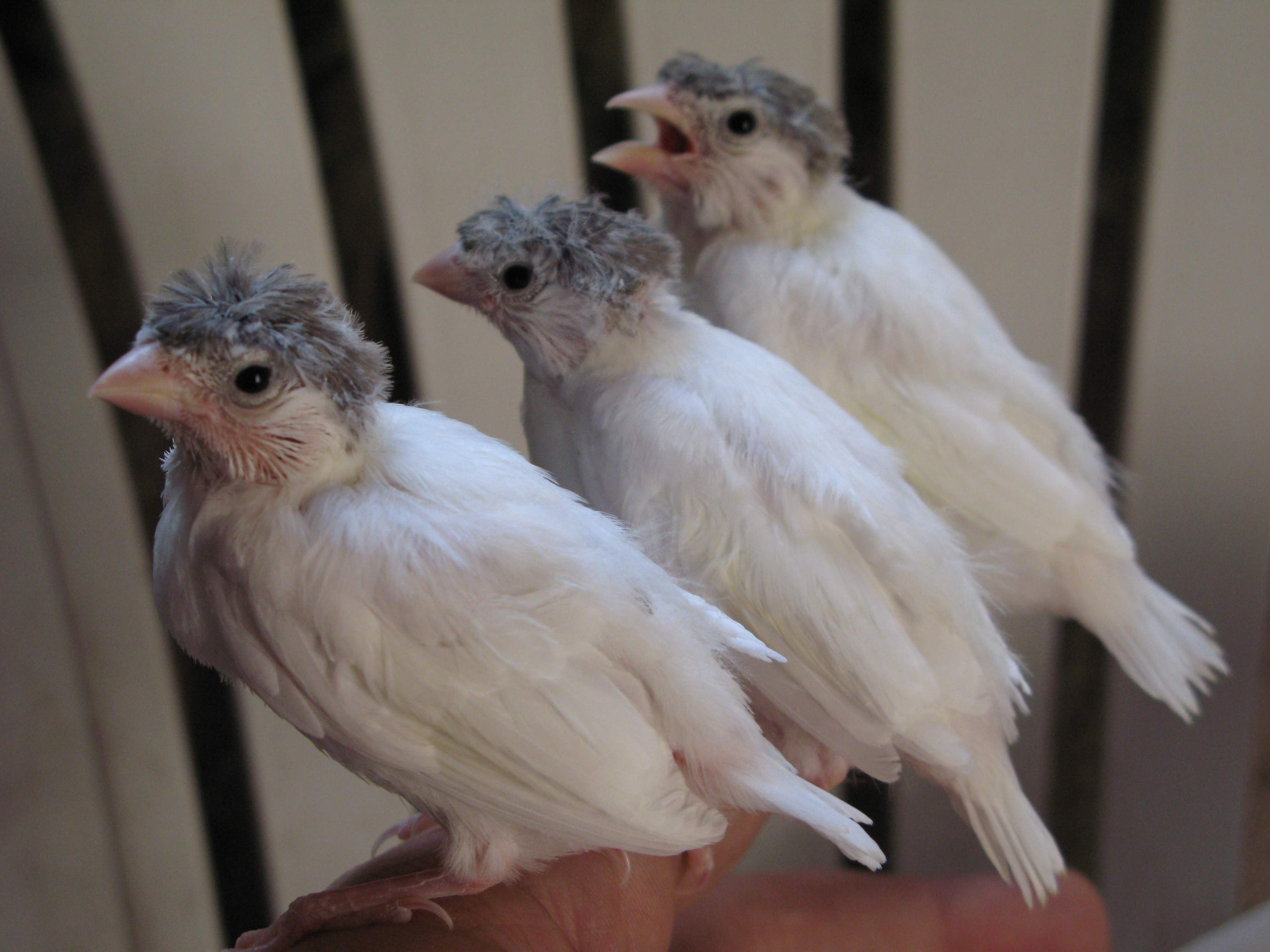
Young canaries

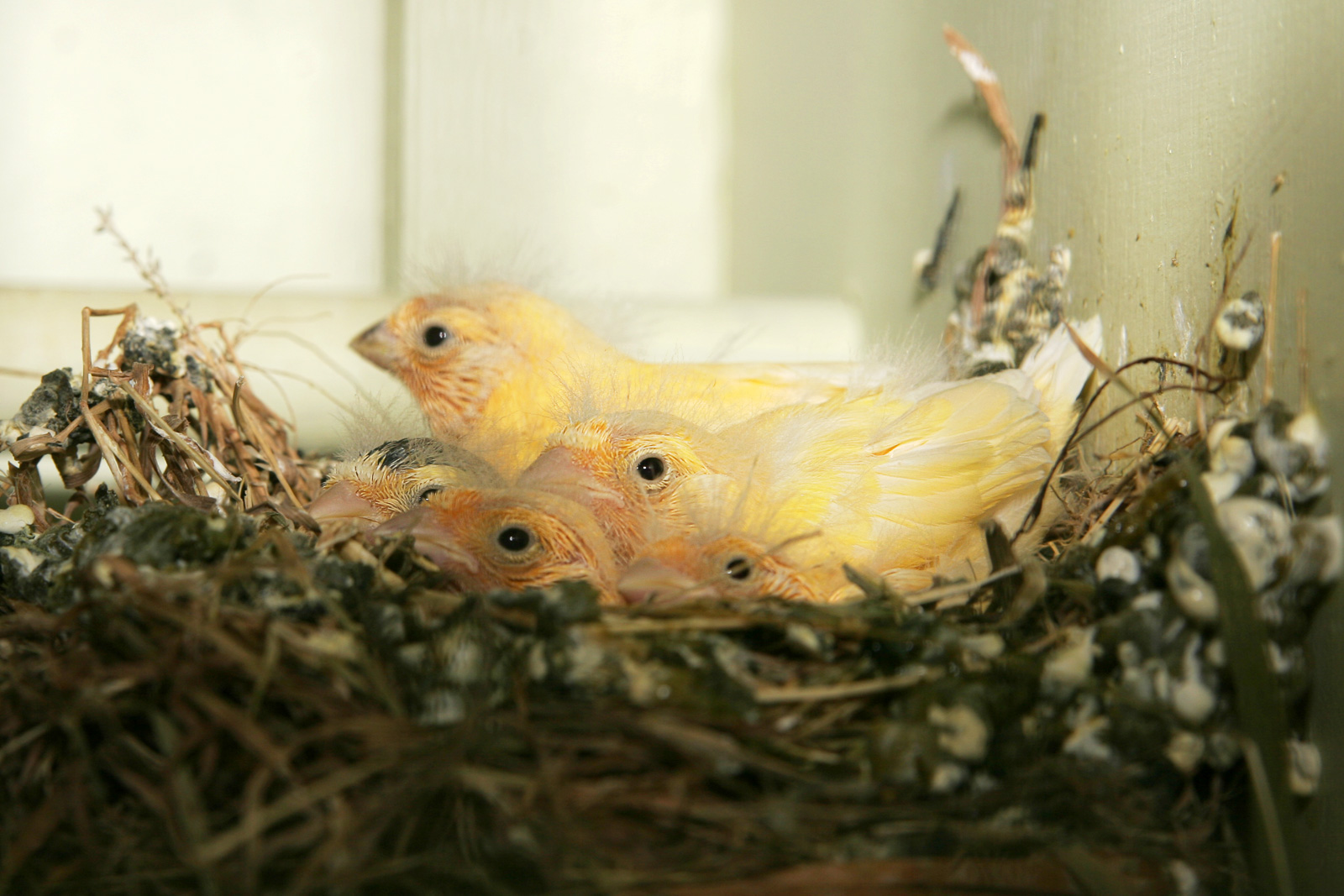
Newly born canary chicks of a few days old

On the day they hatch, the young live off the yolk sac; they are brooded by the female and not fed until the next day. During the first few days of the young's life, the male takes over the task of finding the food and passes it from his crop to the female. The female regurgitates this food from her crop and feeds the young with the twice-soaked food mush.

On the 16th day, the young leave the nest but are still fed by their parents until the 30th day. After three to four months, the now independent young birds complete their juvenile moult, during which only the small feathers, excluding wing and tail feathers, are replaced, and are sexually mature.

=== Diet ===
Canaries are granivorous animals, meaning they feed on grains and seeds that they find in their habitat. Canary breeders usually feed them with mixtures, which can be found commercially or made at home, using high-quality seeds, such as: canary seed, millet, linseed, rapeseed, radish seed, lettuce seed, endive seed, oats, hemp seed, and niger seed. Canaries also feed on vegetables, fruits, and legumes, which are very important for providing them with a large amount of vitamins. This includes fresh greens and vegetables such as lettuce leaves, broccoli, Brussels sprouts, and grated carrots, fruits such as apples, pears and oranges, chickweed, and wild herbs such as dandelions.

During breeding, it is beneficial to supplement this with egg food. This encourages the parents to feed and allows for better development of the chicks. It should be supplemented with chicken eggs, gelatine, breadcrumbs, or biscuit crumbs. Cuttlefish bone can also be given to provide the calcium needed for proper eggshell formation. During feeding, chicks are provided with live insects and a soft, protein-rich diet, along with sprouted seeds.

=== Diseases ===
Parasites are the most common cause of canaries' illness. Stress-induced immune deficiencies cause bacteria (salmonella, Escherichia coli) in the intestines to multiply to such an extent that bacterial enteritis develops. The affected canary develops diarrhoea and dies of dehydration within a few days. Other illnesses include broken wings, legs, and toes. Cataracts can also occur.

Another cause of the disease is the canarypox virus. Infection occurs through infected birds or through mosquitoes as carriers. The incubation period is three to 16 days. Characteristic symptoms of this disease are nodules on the horns and at the corners of the beak, severe respiratory problems and death by suffocation or survival as a virus carrier. Ornithosis, which has no clear symptoms, is difficult to diagnose and must be reported. Symptoms over a longer period include complaints such as shortness of breath, diarrhoea, a runny nose or mucous secretions. Canaries can also become infected with atypical avian influenza (Newcastle disease). This disease is contagious for humans, who then develop conjunctivitis. It is transmitted through raw chicken eggshells or wild birds.

One way to monitor the health of domestic canaries is to observe the colour of their droppings. The faeces should be a clear black, and the urine, after drying, should be off-white. Canaries often die with little warning, and without clear reason.

== Song ==
Song of a common male canary

The canary's song consists of syllables, grouped into phrases that are arranged in flexible sequences. Phrases are defined by a fundamental time-scale that is independent of the underlying syllable duration. The song begins with a variable, soft introduction of a few syllables and culminates in a very loud verse of hard descending syllables. The male sings very long stanzas built from many verses or phrases. The vocal repertoire is stable and usually includes 30 to 40 different individual syllables. In addition, the canary can distinguish sequences of sounds, store them in memory and reproduce them. Therefore, it can learn the song inherent to the species. It can imitate the sounds and sequences of sounds of other birds, and also include other people's noises in its own singing.

Instead of a succession of noisy bursts, the bird must know how, with a silvery, sonorous voice, to descend regularly through all the tones of the octave. The most admired notes are the bow-trill (bow-roll), the bell note, the flute, the water-bubble, the nightingale note, wood-lark note...

— from The Bird Fancier's Companion, Charles Reiche, 1853

Some of the canary's song is innate, but individual learning also occurs. The song pattern and the verse, with its specific notes and rhythm, are genetically determined. However, the fine structures (syllables) are open to learning, and experience is gained by listening to songs of their own species. The father's example is very important, but the young also learn from other males and young birds of the same age. This learning ability is particularly encouraged in singing schools. Some syllables are formed without any recognisable models, allowing the canary to improvise. Females normally do not sing; Dutch researcher Tessa Hartog suggested that they would start singing with increased testosterone that influence the part of their brains that control singing. Canaries also learn from human provided sounds. For example, in pre-revolution Russia, the local bred canaries had even learnt to sing the national anthem, God Save The Tsar!.

After the first breeding season is over, the males sing less and less and eventually stop singing altogether (refractory period). After the annual change of plumage, the moult, they sing the autumn song. This is far more vivid than the full song, meaning it has no fixed temporal structure, but the individual elements are also much more variable. The pauses vary in length, and the ratio of tours to syllables is strongly skewed in favour of the latter. In winter and spring, the song then begins to stabilise again until it reaches full song level again in the next breeding season. The song may have changed slightly compared to the previous year: some syllables have remained the same, others have been forgotten, and as a result the canary may create new melodies. During the breeding season, females sing only occasionally. After the end of their last brood, around July, they spontaneously sing the summer song. From autumn until the beginning of the next breeding season, they sing the autumn song. Females sing most frequently in October.

For newborns, male canaries start to learn to sing after about 30 to 40 days. This first phase of learning (subsong) lasts until shortly before the juvenile moult. Before the juvenile moult begins, the bird is silent for about two weeks. Only between the 70th and 90th day does the second learning phase (plastic song) begin, which lasts until about the 150th day of life. After the juvenile moult, the third phase of vocal training begins (juvenile autumn song), which lasts until about the 250th day of life. During this time, talent can already be seen, so that the singing canary can enter what is known as singing school. By the breeding season of the following year, around the 300th day of life, the canary has completed its apprenticeship and reached full song, which it maintains throughout the breeding season.

Closely related to singing is the canary's ability to hear. Optimal sensitivity is between 3200 Hz and 4000 Hz. The lower threshold of hearing is at 1100 Hz, and the upper threshold is at 10,000 Hz.

=== Mimicry ===
There are some rare cases of canaries imitating human speech. For example, a domestic canary named Pinchi, who lived in 1966 from 2–3 months of age with a resident of the city of Leningrad, learned to imitate the human speech of his owner-educator and weave it into his song.

== Breeds ==
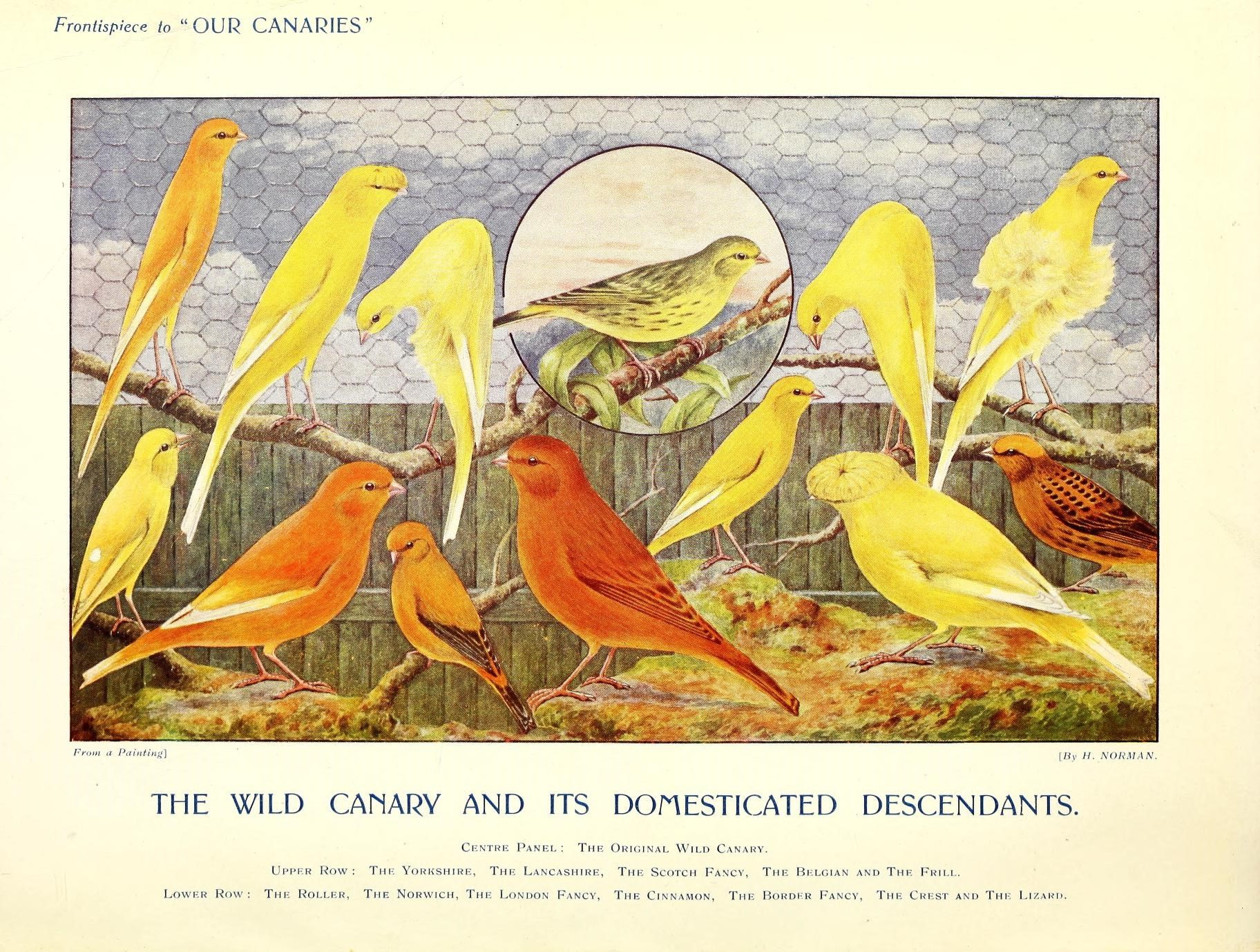
Various types of canaries depicted in a British guide from 1911

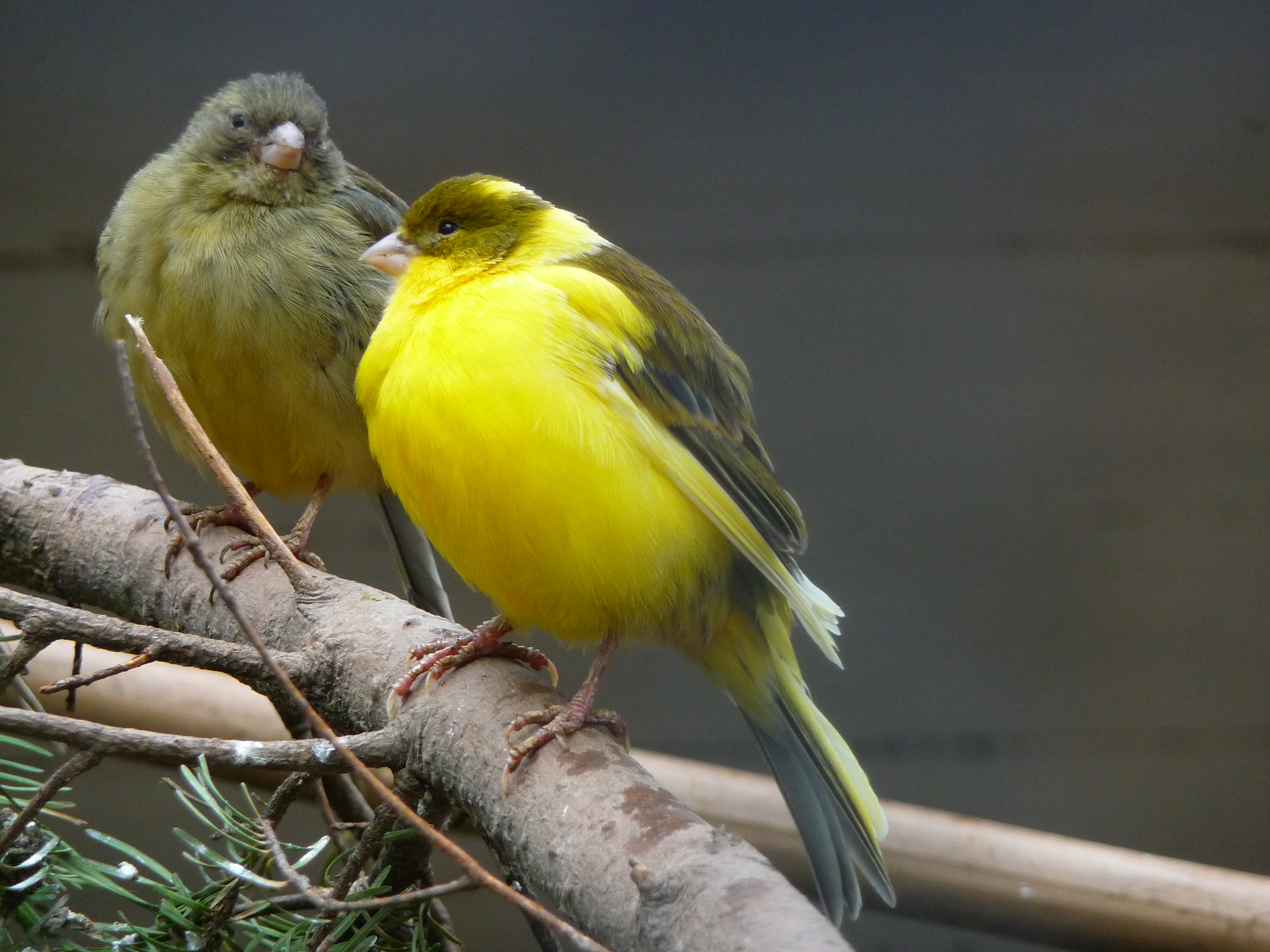
While stereotypically yellow, domestic canaries are of various colours

Domestic canaries are generally divided into three main groups: those that have been bred for singing capabilities, for their distinctive colours, or for their shape and posture. Many canaries, however, do not necessarily fall in any of these categories as they are not selectively bred, and have variable morphology and colours – these are often called "common canaries".

=== Song canaries ===
Song canaries are bred for their unique and specific song patterns. They are often specially trained to sing: a canary around the age of six months old would spend time for a few weeks alone in a cage, exposed to the sound of their conspecifics but not distracted by territorial fights. The canaries would gradually learn different verses. Many different types of song canaries have been bred with distinct sounds: the COM (World Ornithological Confederation) officially recognises three distinct song-bred breeds, which are written below.

Main breeds

The Harz Roller, first bred in the Harz Mountains of Germany, was the first type of canary specifically bred for song. This canary sings in a gentle, melodic way, with a closed beak and an inflated throat. Compared to wild canaries (and other song breeds), the Harzer has a lower pitch with narrower frequencies. Its deep song can be musically classified in the bass register. Its base consists of a continuous rhythm outputting at least 40 notes per second.

The Belgian Waterslager is known for its rather loud yet lower-pitched sound that mimics the babbling of water. They were first bred in Antwerp and Mechelen and its name was coined in 1905, coming from the Dutch words for water and butcher; its French name is Malinois. The Waterslager's song is described as being striking, somewhat similar to a nightingale's, alternating between high and low notes, and an emphasis on the 'water' chime (Dutch: klokkende). The song is characterised by a sequence of repeated sound utterances, also called tone syllables. Like the Harz Roller, it sings with a closed beak, but may open for higher notes. Despite being a song-bred canary, the Waterslager also has other characteristics: it has a slightly bent forward posture with a relatively small head, standing on rather high legs, and an approximate size of 6.5 inches (17 cm). They have yellow plumage, sometimes with light spots. Research has shown that, compared to other breeds, the Belgian Waterslager has abnormal hair cells that contribute to high-frequency hearing loss.

The Spanish Timbrado has been bred as an evolution of the wild canary. Its song is the loudest of the three main song breeds, with a powerful metallic voice (high tonal range) and an open beak, consisting of 12 notes. It has a variation in its song, with very short verses and in constant alteration, and a repertoire that consists of a contrast of various tonal layers. Originating in the early 20th century, the name 'Timbrado' is Spanish for "ringing" ('timbre' means "bell"). Females of this variety are able to sing and better than those of other breeds. While it is permitted in various colours, most Timbrados are variegated green/yellow/mottled, resembling the wild canary. It averages approximately 5.2 inches (13 cm) in length and has a notched tail, like its wild ancestor. Development of the Timbrado has led to distinct variations, sub-categorised into the Classics (continuous tours, i.e. timbres and rolled variations) and Floreados (discontinuous notes, i.e. clear break between syllables).

Other canaries

There are more song-bred canary breeds. The American Singer was developed from a Harz Roller and a Border Fancy (a type canary). Its ability for rolled and chopped notes gives it a variety of singing styles (both high and low on the tonal range) and an overall balance. While sounding close to a Harz, the American is able to sing with an open beak. It also takes into account its appearance and variety of colours. The American Singer was first bred in Boston by a group of eight female breeders in the 1930s and have been popular in North America. It is not, however, recognised as a distinct breed by the COM.

The Russian Canary has a distinctly different song. High-pitched, it has some resemblance to the chirping of a great tit. These canaries originated from Tyrol, Germany in the 18th century and its sound was evolved by Russian breeders who were impressed by the canary's mimicking intelligence. They taught their canaries the sounds of local wild birds (including the yellowhammer) and using the likes of organs and flutes. This breed has remained largely unfamiliar outside the Russia and its environ. The song training effectively provided countryside bird sounds to urban residents as in the imperial capital St Petersburg, making them extremely popular in the late 19th century.

A number of other song-bred canaries exist such as the Moroccan Flawta. Hailing from northern Morocco, this canary has a melodious tone with slow rhythm and flute-like accents. The Slavujar is another singing breed, who were trained by Serbian breeders to learn the sound of the nightingale. Both the Flawta and Slavujar sit in the middle of the tonal range. The Spanish Singer (Spanish: Cantor Español) was developed from Timbrados with strongly detached song sections without a fixed structure, sung in semi-high and mild-high registers. It was recognised as a distinct breed for the first time by the COM/OMJ in 2017.

=== Colour canaries ===
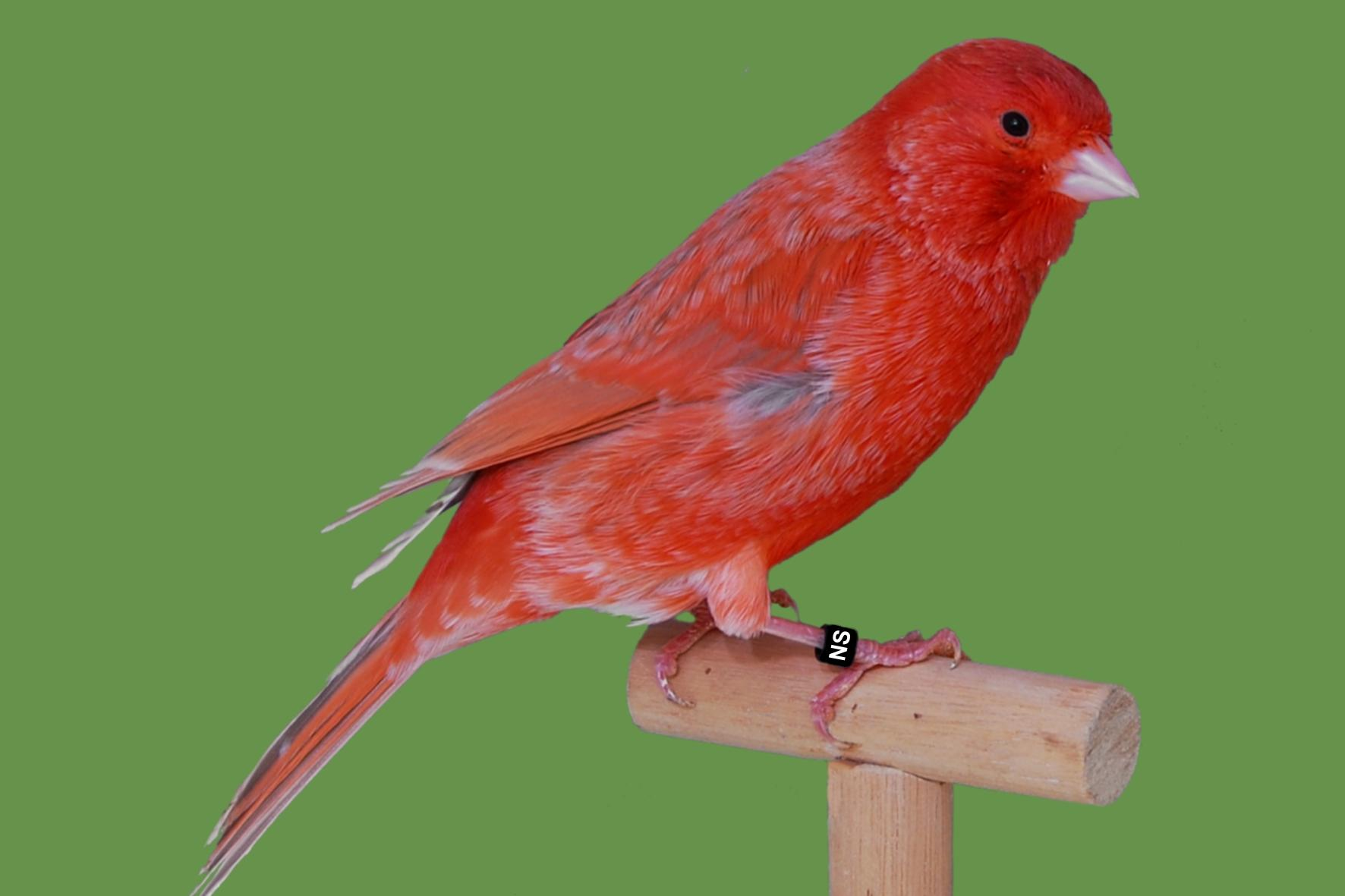
A colour-bred canary ('Red Isabel')

While wild canaries are a yellowish-green colour, domestic canaries have been selectively bred for a wide variety of colours, such as yellow, orange, brown, black, white, red, and more. Coloured canaries can be divided into two broad categories: lipochromic canaries and melanistic canaries. Lipochromic canaries have light plumage and do not exhibit any melanin; they can be white, yellow, or red. Melanistic canaries have a so-called ground colour (white, yellow, or red) and possess melanins (eumelanins and/or phaeomelanins), adding elements like stripes to the plumage.

The white phenotype can be due to two different mutations: recessive white and dominant white. They are distinguished by the fact that a dominant white canary always has some traces of yellow (or red) in its flight feathers, while a recessive white canary is completely white.

Coloured canaries would show one of the basic colours and one of the feather textures. Melanin canaries on the other hand would also additionally display melanin colours: this includes a wide variety of specific colour mutations such as – Ino, Eumo, Satinette, Bronze, Ivory, Onyx, Mosaic, Brown, red factor, Green (Wild Type): darkest black and brown melanin shade in yellow ground birds, Yellow Melanin: mutation showing yellow ground colour with brown and black pigment, Yellow Lipochrome: mutation creating the loss of brown and black pigment, leaving yellow ground colour etc.

The red factor canary was created by Hans Julius Duncker and Karl Reich in the 1920s through hybridisation with the red siskin (Spinus cucullatus), a species of South American finch. Evidence of hybridisation has also been found between the domestic canary and the black-chinned siskin (Spinus barbatus) in captivity.

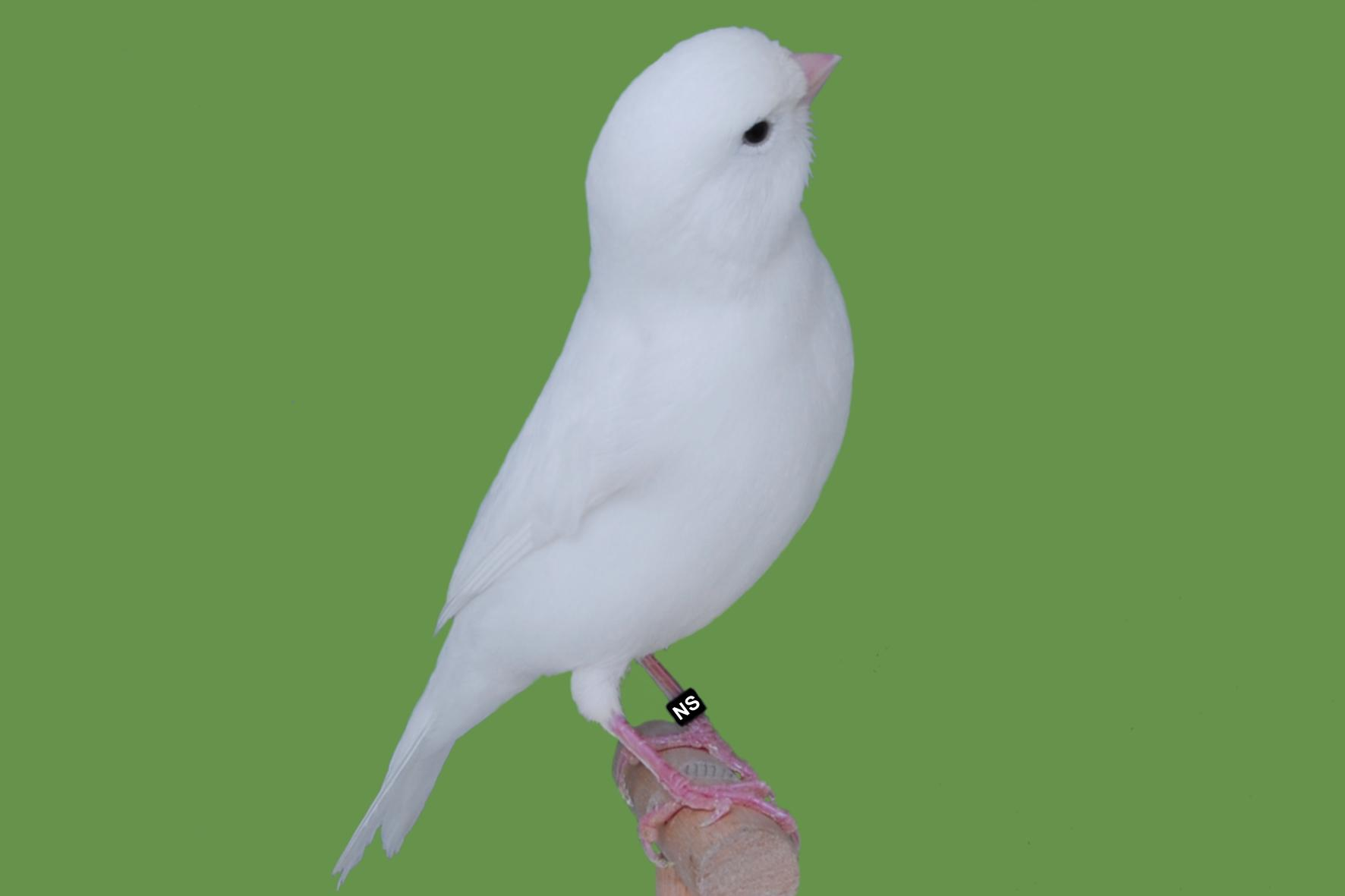
White recessive

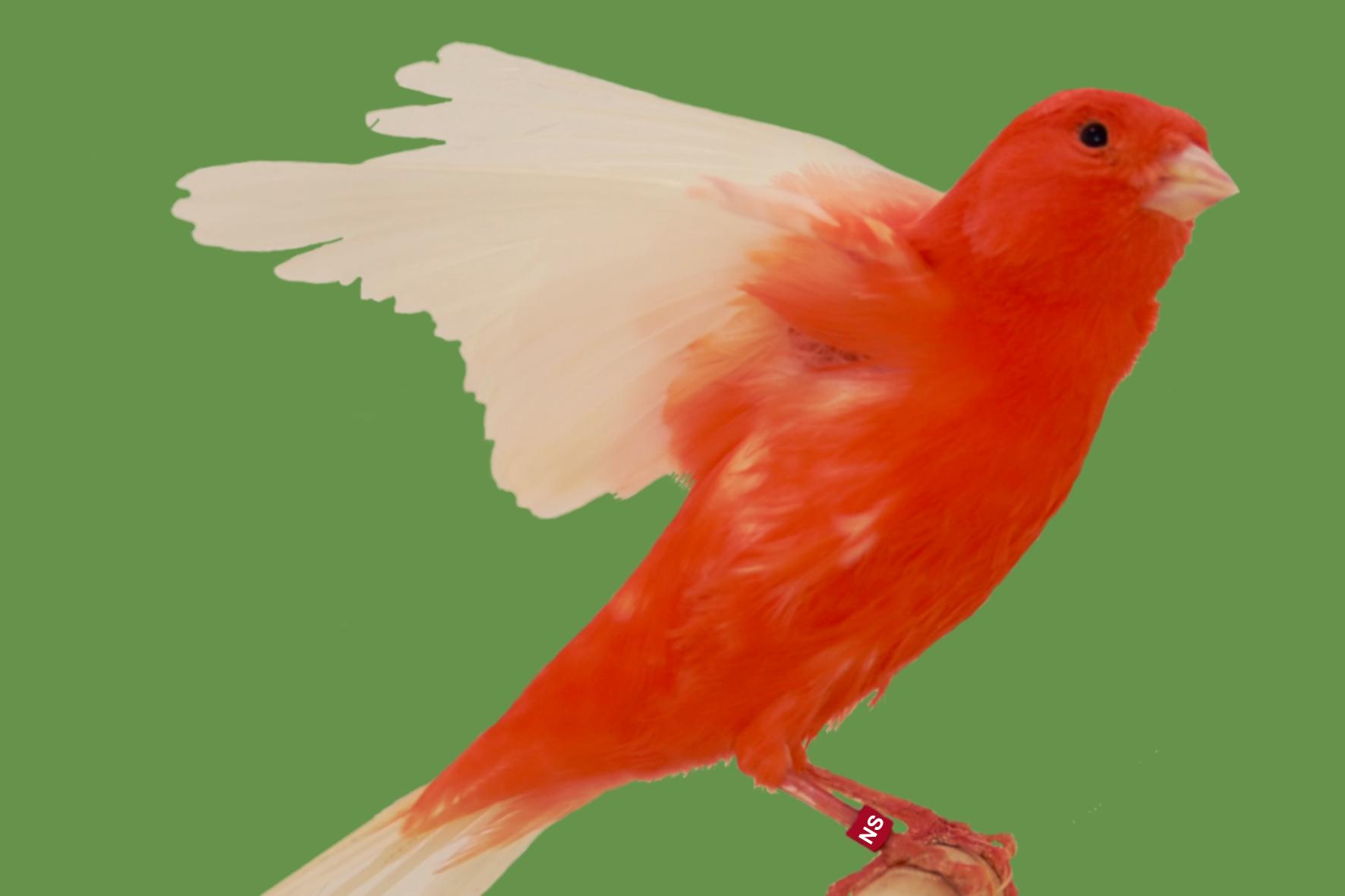
Intense red with white wings

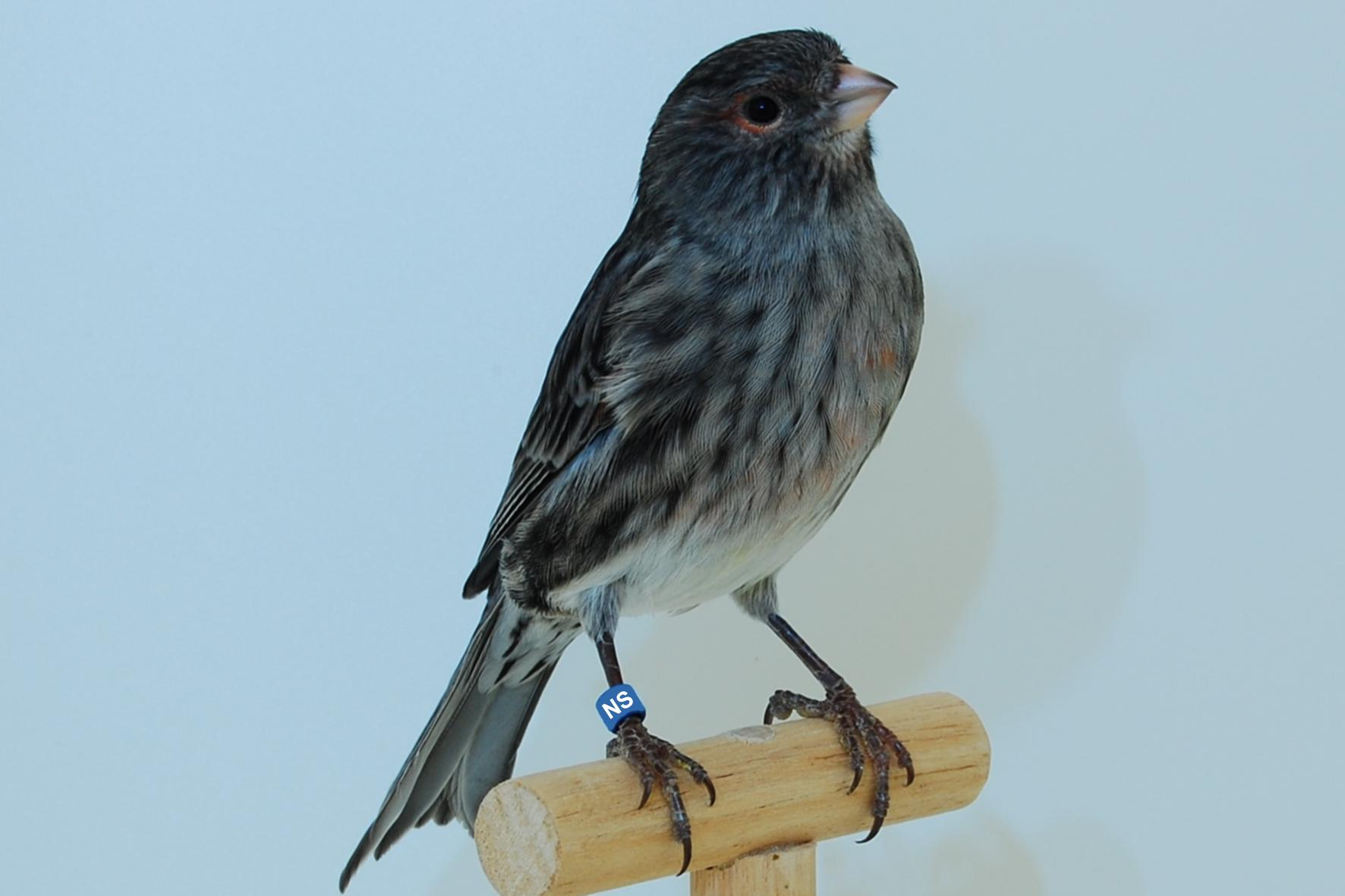
Black red mosaic

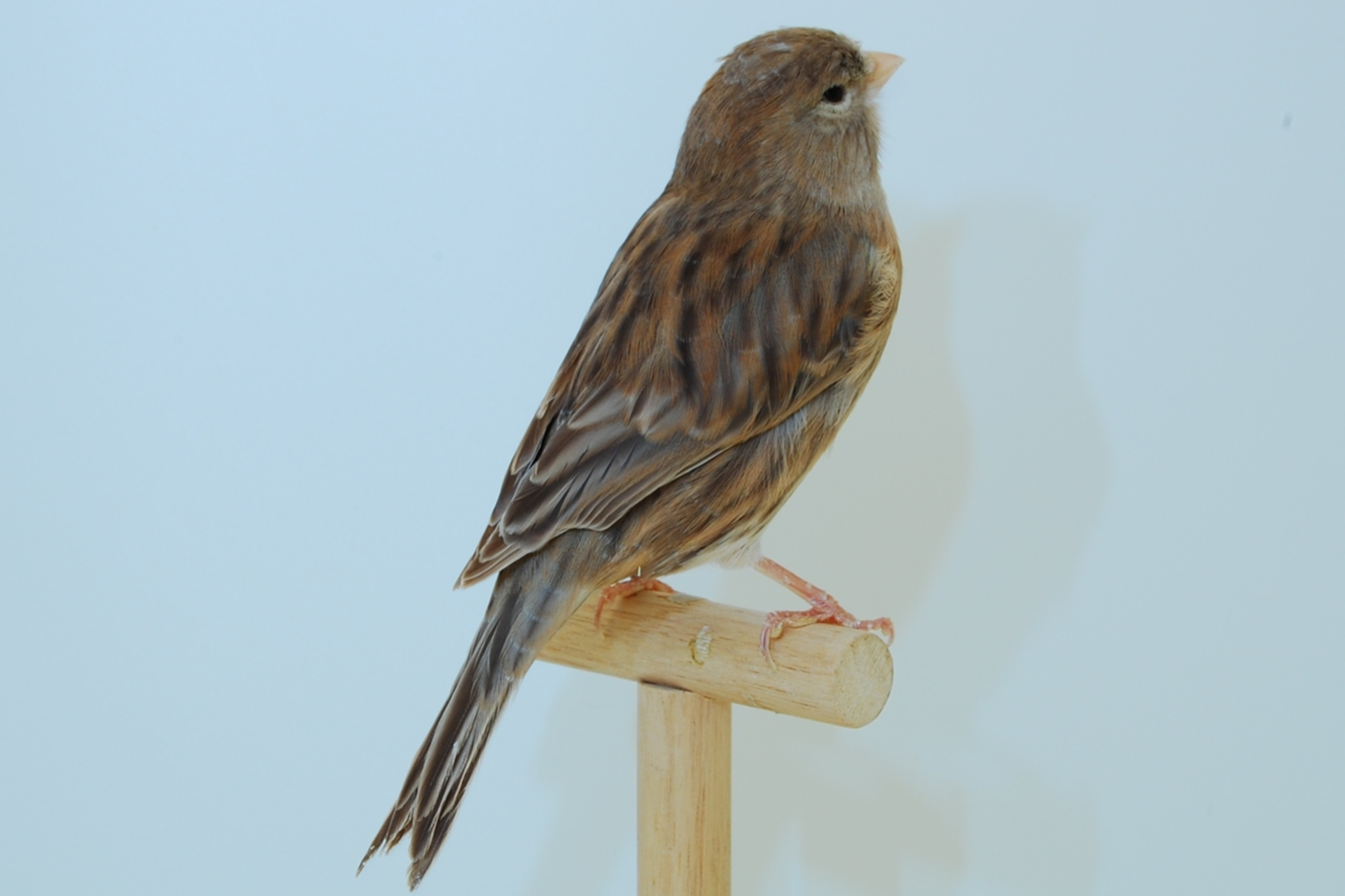
Brown white

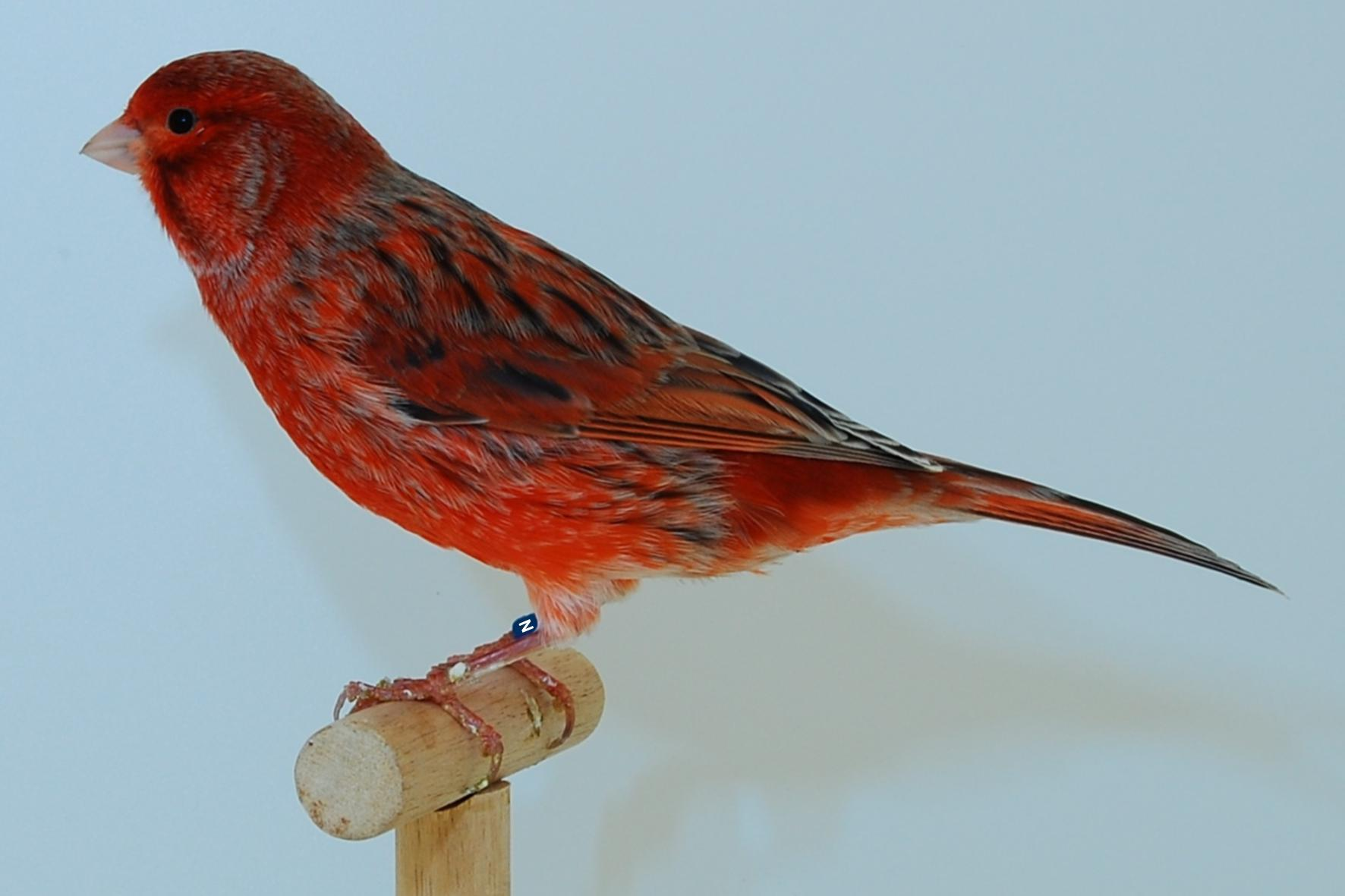
Agate red

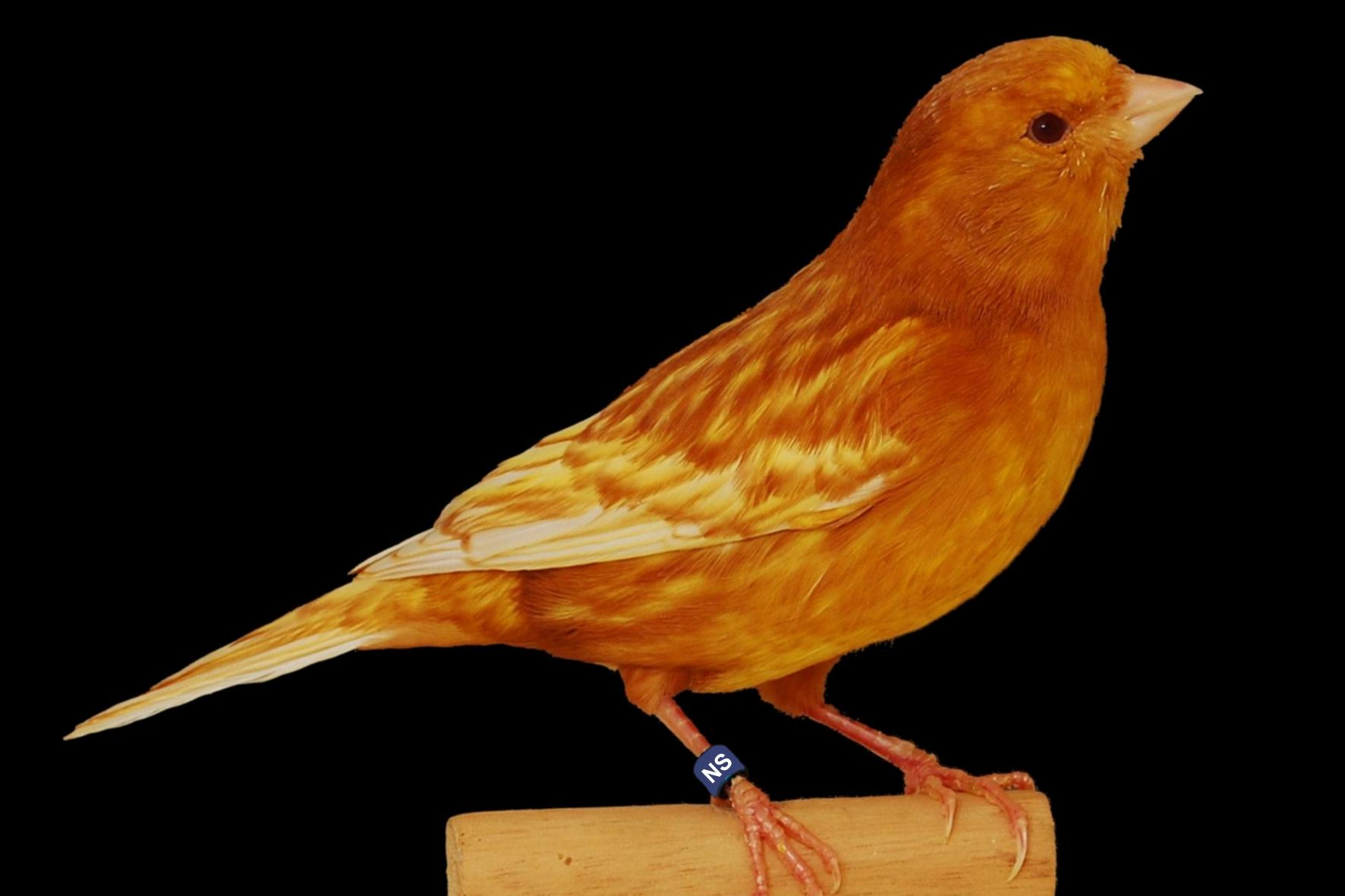
Phaeo yellow intense

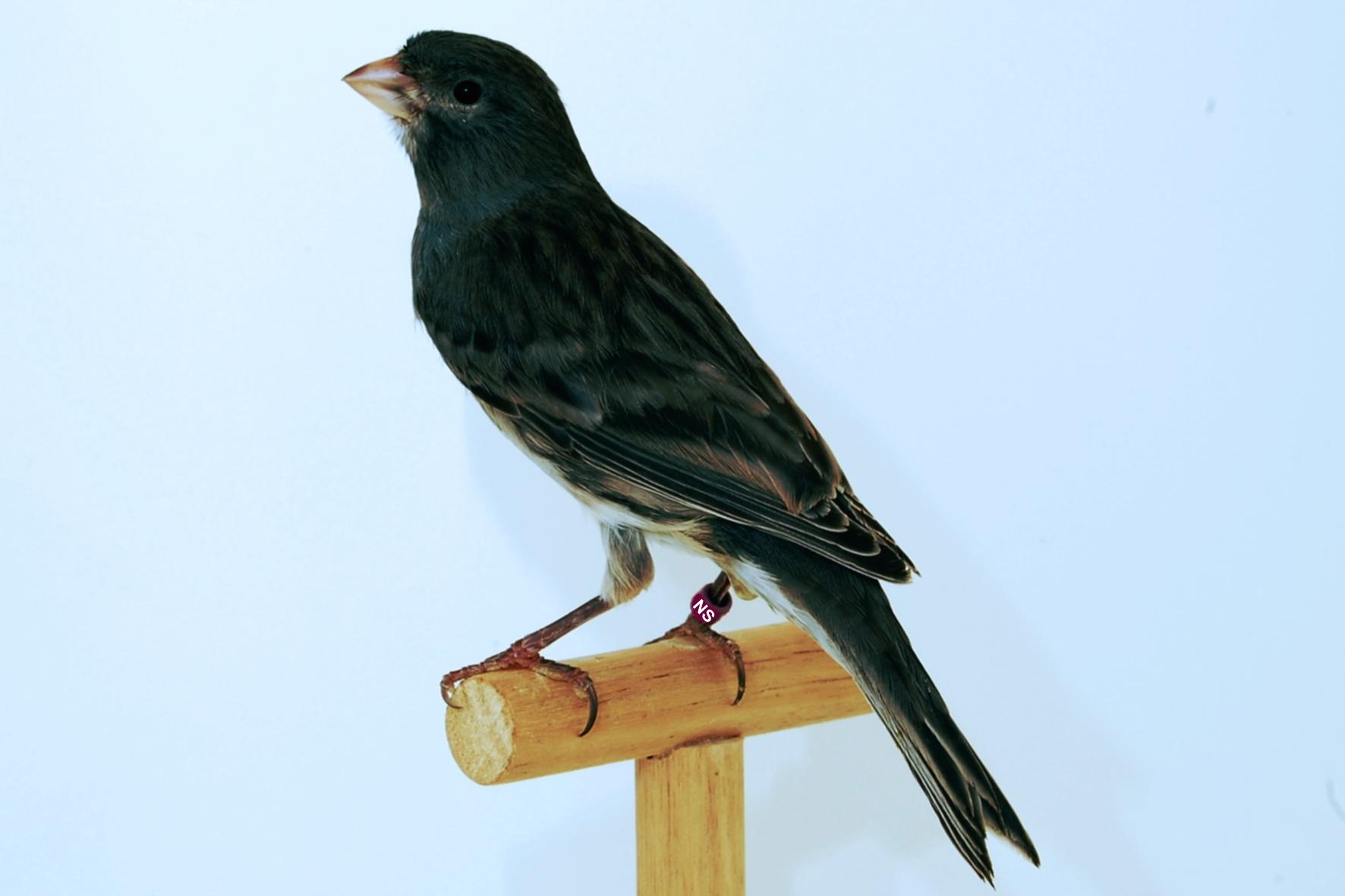
Black onyx white

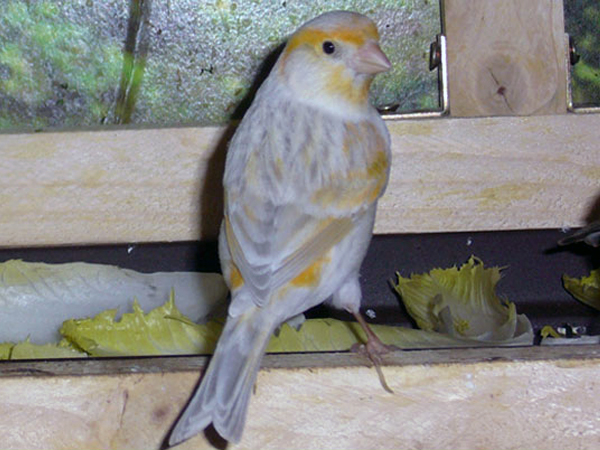
Achat opal

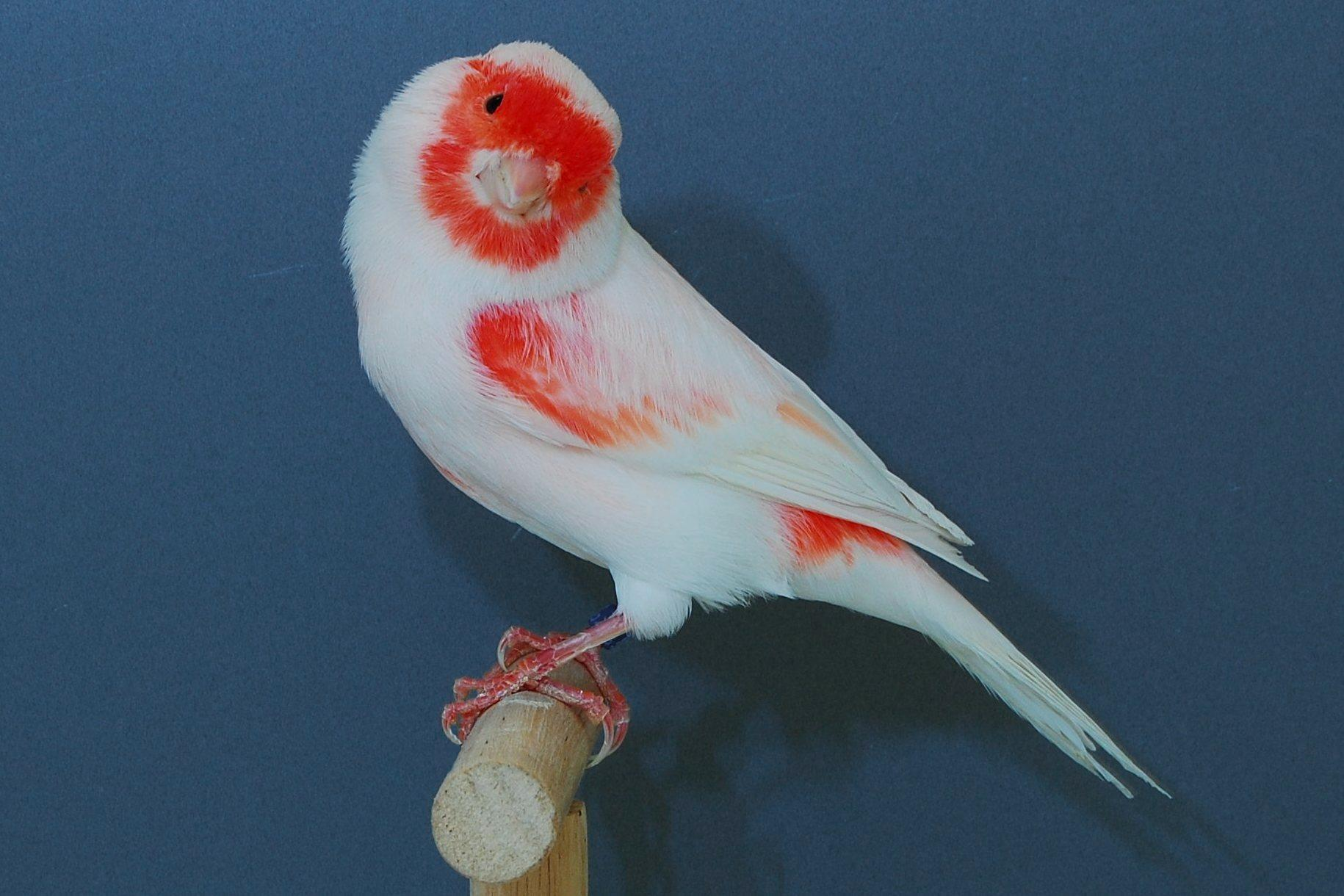
Red mosaic

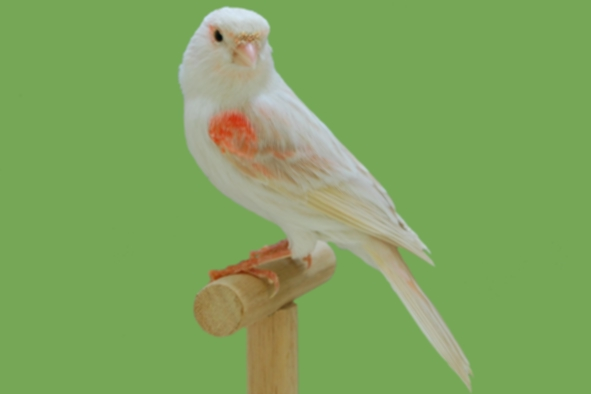
Satinette red mosaic

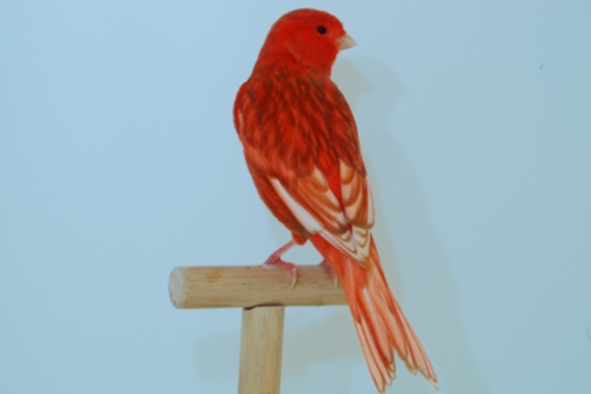
Phaeo red intense

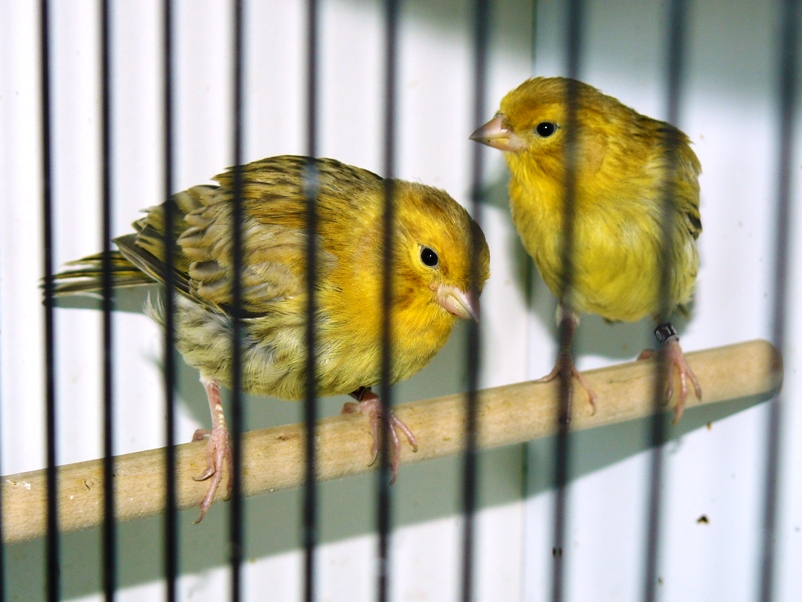
Agate yellow

=== Type and posture canaries ===
Type canaries, or posture canaries, are bred for their shape and conformation. Posture canaries can be larger or smaller compared to common (including song-bred and colour-bred) canaries, and may have a unique morphology (egg-shaped, number 7-shaped, etc.). For example, certain breeds may have crests on their head (crested canaries) or have curly plumage (frill canaries).

New breeds continue to be developed in the world of posture canaries. Judges of the C.O.M. from all over the world determine whether a new breed is officially recognised, and they often cite that the breed must have a clear distinction and goal.

Smooth-feathered canaries (small)

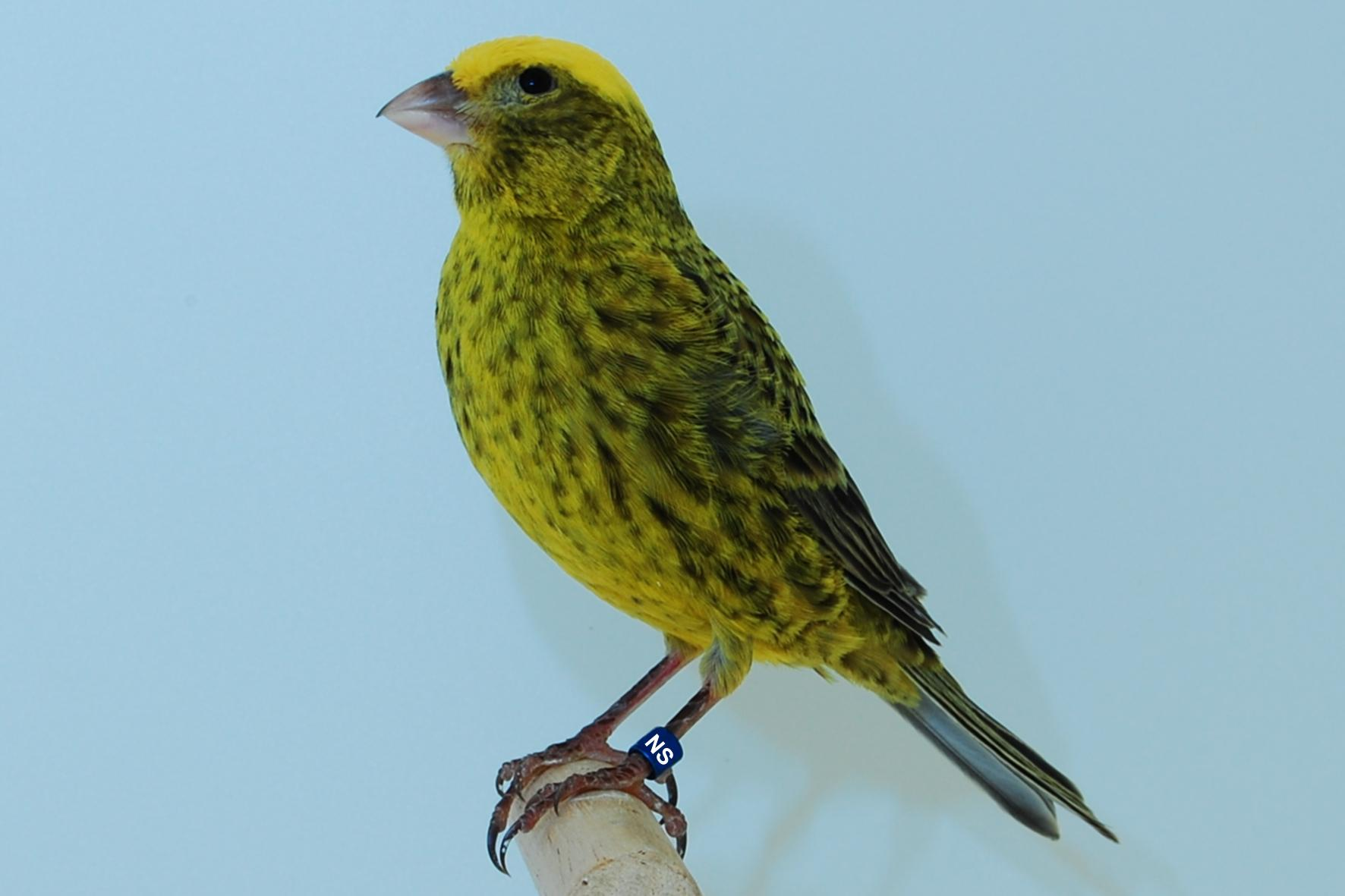
A Lizard Canary (yellow intensive)

The Lizard Canary is the oldest breed still in existence, having generally remained in its original form since the early 18th century. They are thought to have originated among Huguenots in France, who migrated to England and brought them along and where they were further bred. It became very popular in England, noted for its stripes, crescent-shaped spots and markings on the feathers of the canary, with its name referring to the reptile-like pattern on its back and breast. The feathers of the Lizard's cap, in contrast to its body, is clear. After the Second World War depleted stock, the Lizard almost became extinct; an association was formed who successfully preserved and saved the breed from extinction. A closely related breed is the London Fancy, a variegated form of the Lizard. It is distinguished by having dark flight and tail feathers, but with a contrasting body that does not contain melanin in those feathers. It dates to at least the 1820s. In 1903 it was described as "rare, handsome, and expensive". The London went extinct a few decades later, and attempts to revive it failed, until the 21st century when efforts by British and Dutch breeders led to canaries resembling the original being exhibited. While originally yellow-black, variants in yellow-brown, white-black and white-brown have been bred.

The Border Fancy canary (originally known as Wee Gem) has a plump, rounded profile and a defined head. Modern Borders are no larger than 5.5". It was bred in the 19th century, named after the border region between Scotland and England, as it was developed in Cumberland but with strains of Scottish bred canaries across the border. As time went by, especially after the Second World War, the Border became increasingly voluminous and larger, probably due to crossbreeding with the Norwich. The Fife Fancy is a breed with a small size (exceeding no more than 4.5" in length) and a well-proportioned body. Its ideal shape is described as being a "a cherry on a pear". This canary originates from Fife in Scotland, in the 1950s, and was created in response to the growing size of the Border Fancy. As a result, the Fife is considered a miniature version of the Border. In recent decades, it has grown in popularity in Britain.

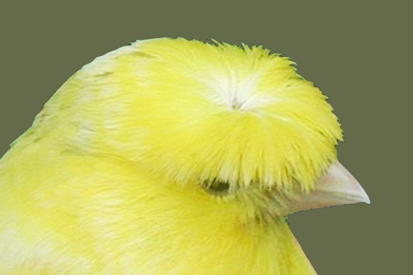
'Desirable' crest of a German Crested canary

The German Crested (Deutsche Haube) is an old breed and the only type of posture canary that combines colour characteristics of colour canaries with a specific type of crest. They formed the basis of the English Lancashire, Gloster and Crested breeds. Unlike the English breeds (round and full crest), the German breed has a broad, oval shaped crest. The crest should have a small centre point from which the head feathers extend flat in all directions. It measures 13.5 centimetres (5.3 in) to 14.5 centimetres (5.7 in).

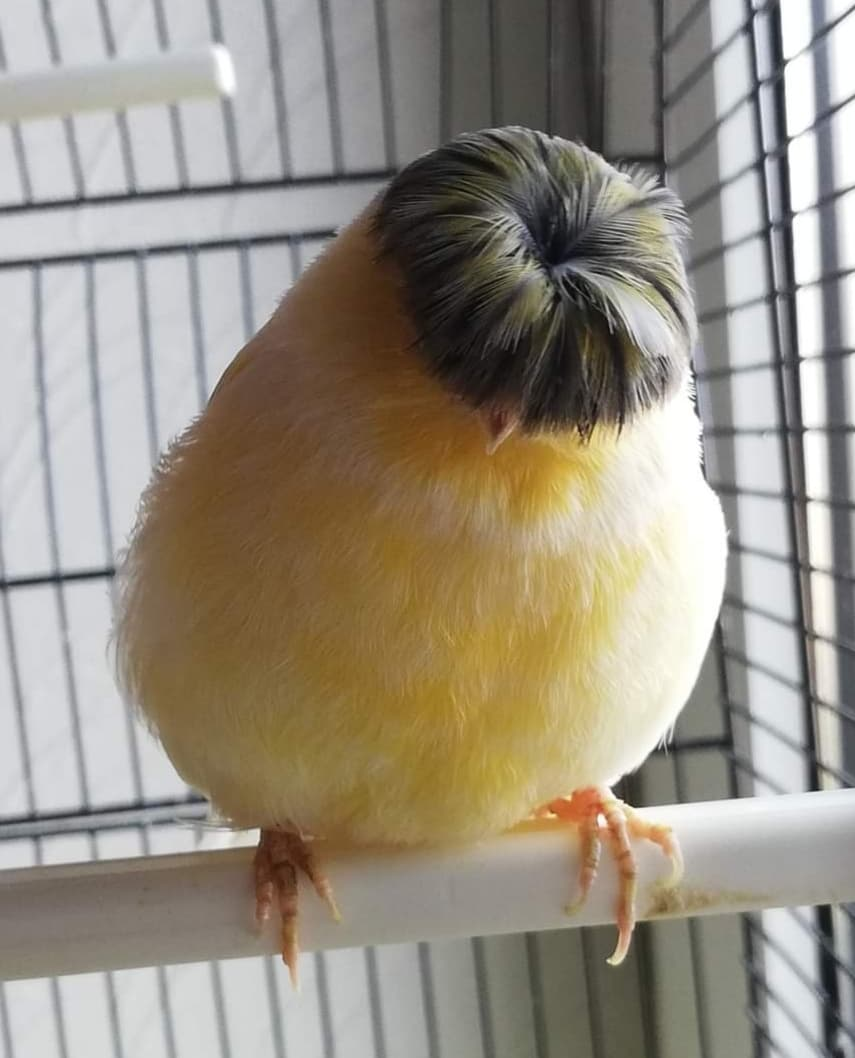
A Gloster Fancy (Corona)

The Gloster Fancy, one of the smaller types of posture canaries, is one of the newer breeds of fancy canaries, having first been exhibited in 1925 and originated from Gloucestershire. The breeders aimed to achieve a miniature size (created from a Border and Crest), and Glosters are often about 4.5 inches in length. There are two variations of the Gloster: the Consort (smooth head) and the Corona (crested). The feather 'wig' on the coronas made them quite popular in the 1960s due to the hairstyles of The Beatles. German breeders developed from the Gloster a new type with a similar round crest but with a rich, bright lipochrome red colour (Deutsche Rotscheke). Such a variety was also made in Staffordshire, England, called the Stafford Canary, which is a cross between the Gloster and the red factor canary.

A number of other smaller sized canaries in this category include the extra small Raza (Spanish: Raza Española) with its slim and narrow body shape, the Irish Fancy, a small, upright canary with a slightly rounded head, and the Rheinländer, a crested canary in yellow, red or white, designed to be miniature version of the Lancashire canary. The only type breed canary to have been made in the United States is the Columbus Fancy. This breed originates from the 1930s, named after Columbus, Ohio. The Columbus has a broad and full chest, neck and back, and has both plainhead and crested variants. It is 5.5 to 6.0" in length.

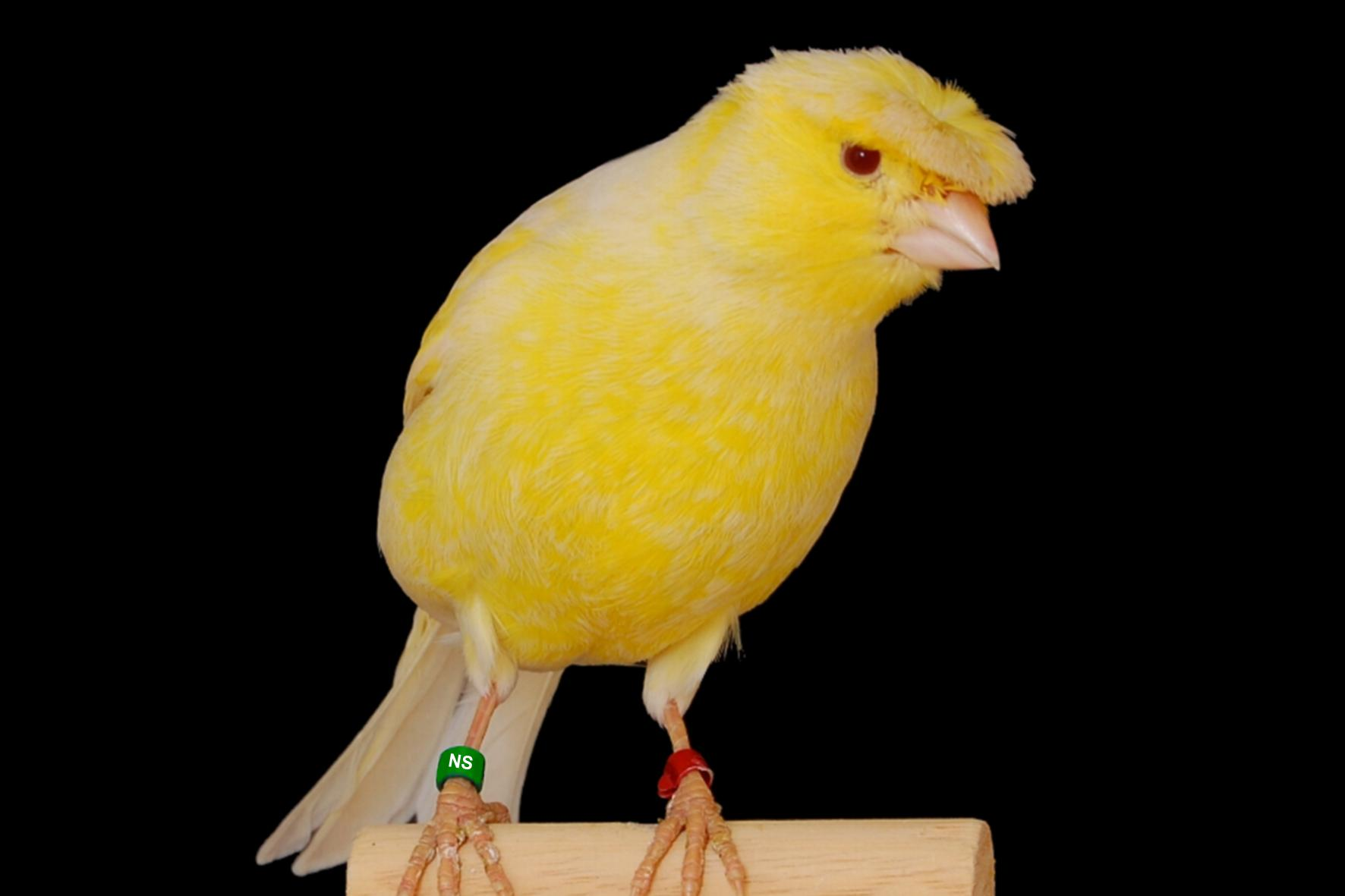
German Crested

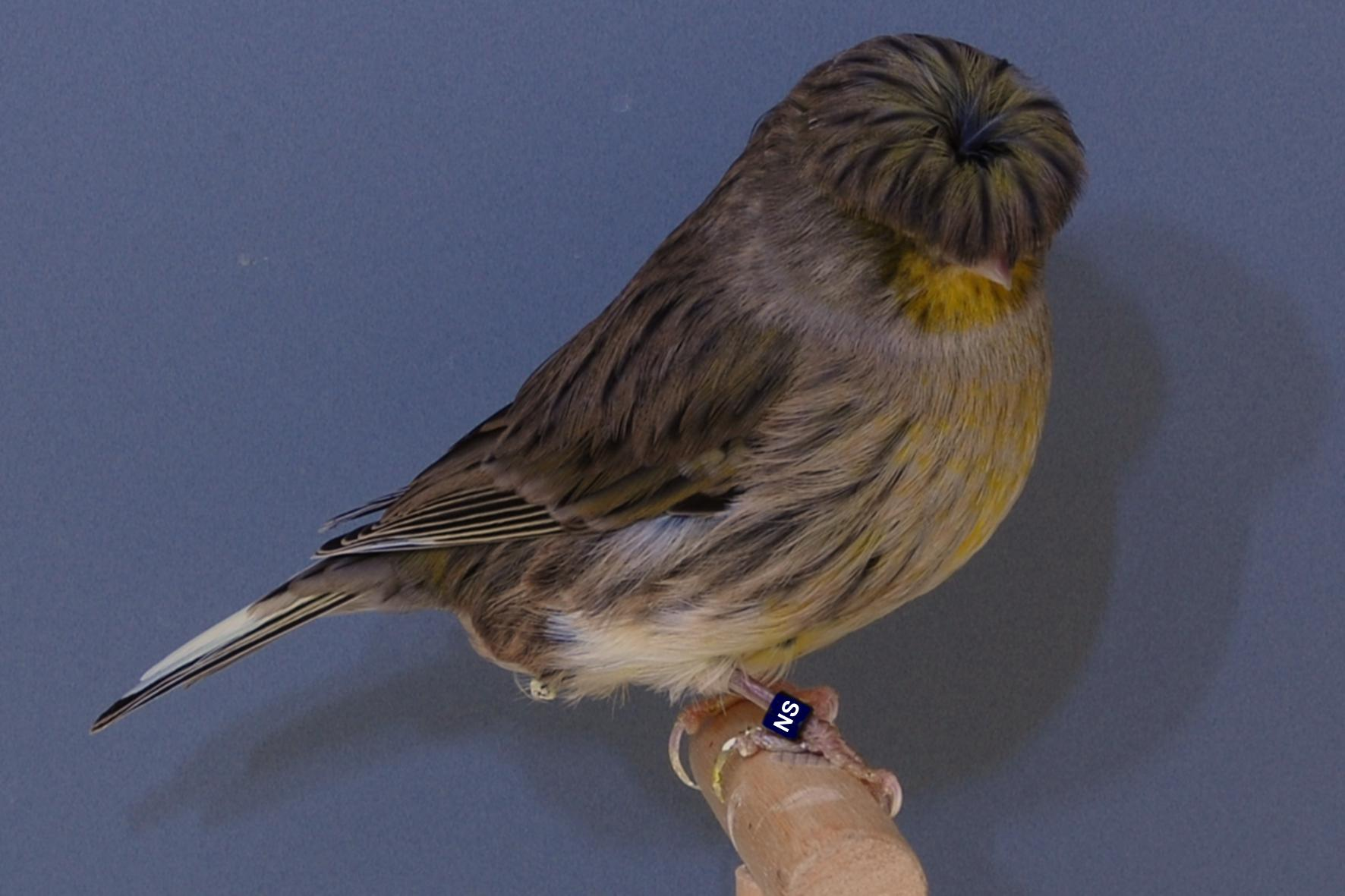
Gloster Fancy (Corona melanin)

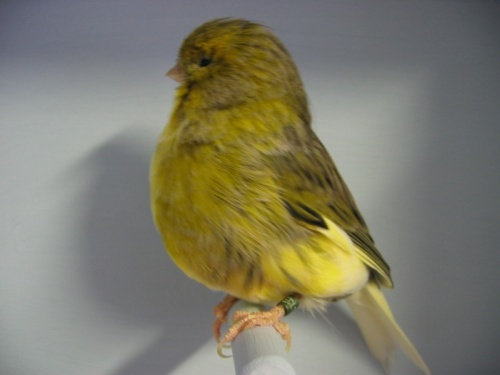
Gloster Fancy (Consort)

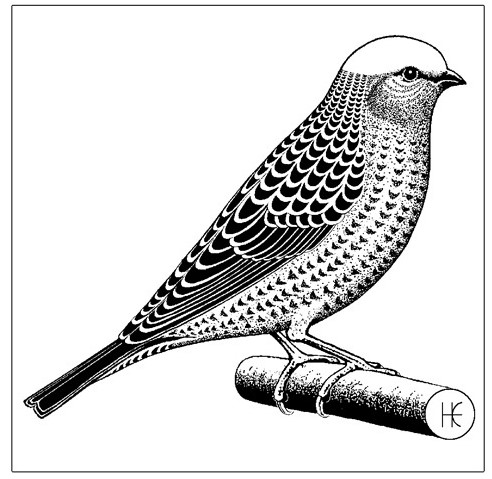
Drawing of an 'ideal' Lizard canary

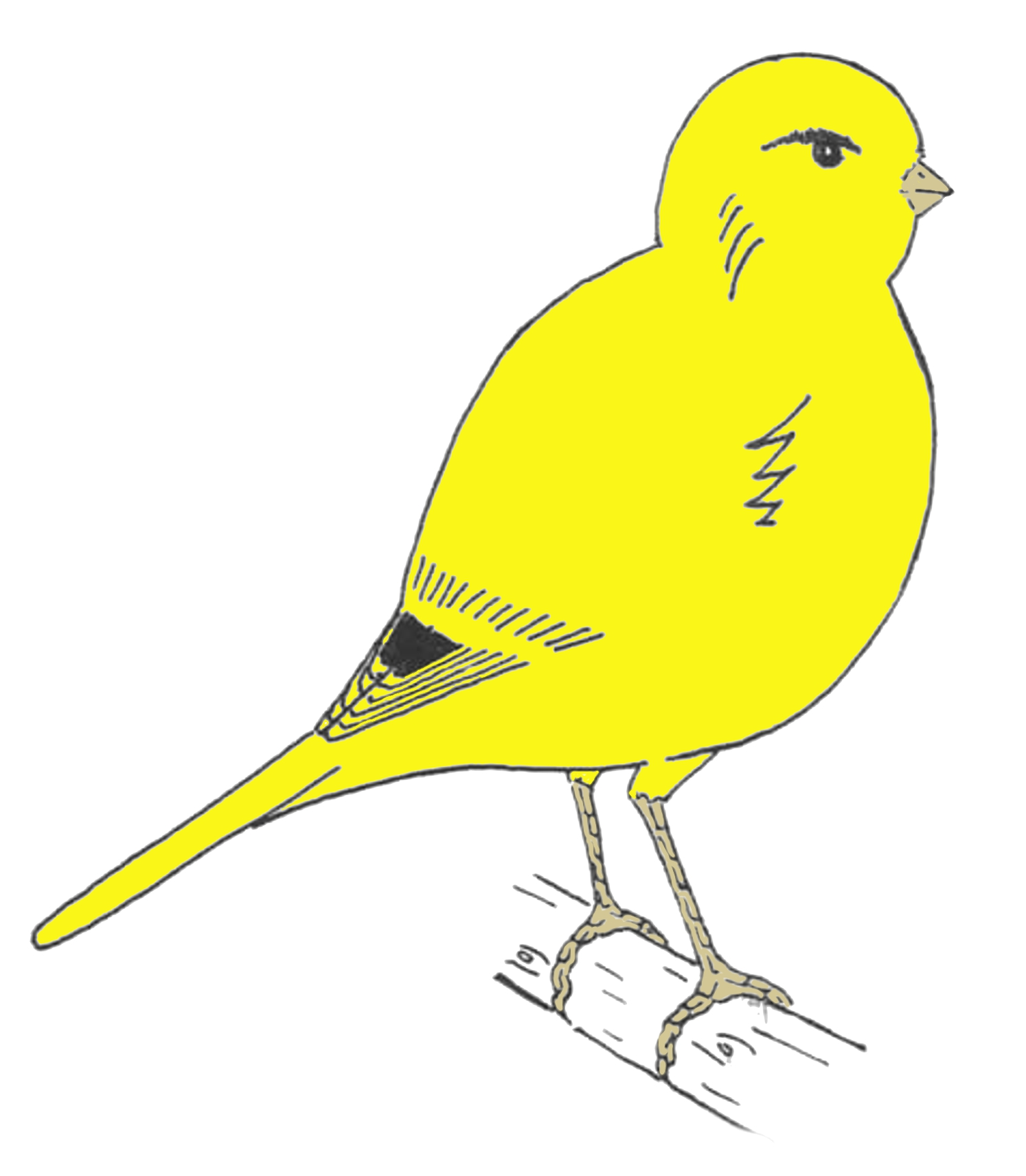
Drawing of an 'ideal' Fife Canary

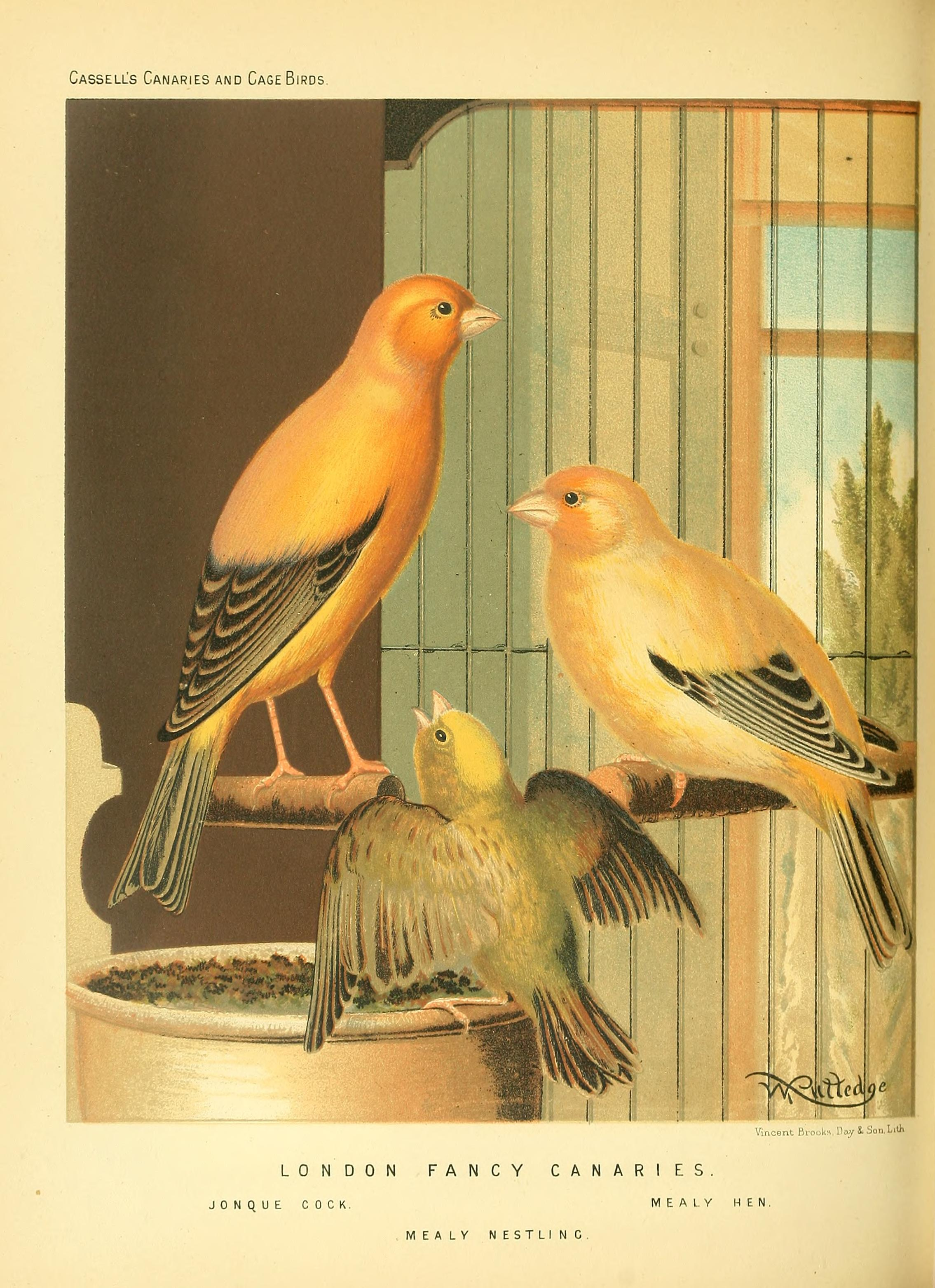
1878 illustration of the London Fancy

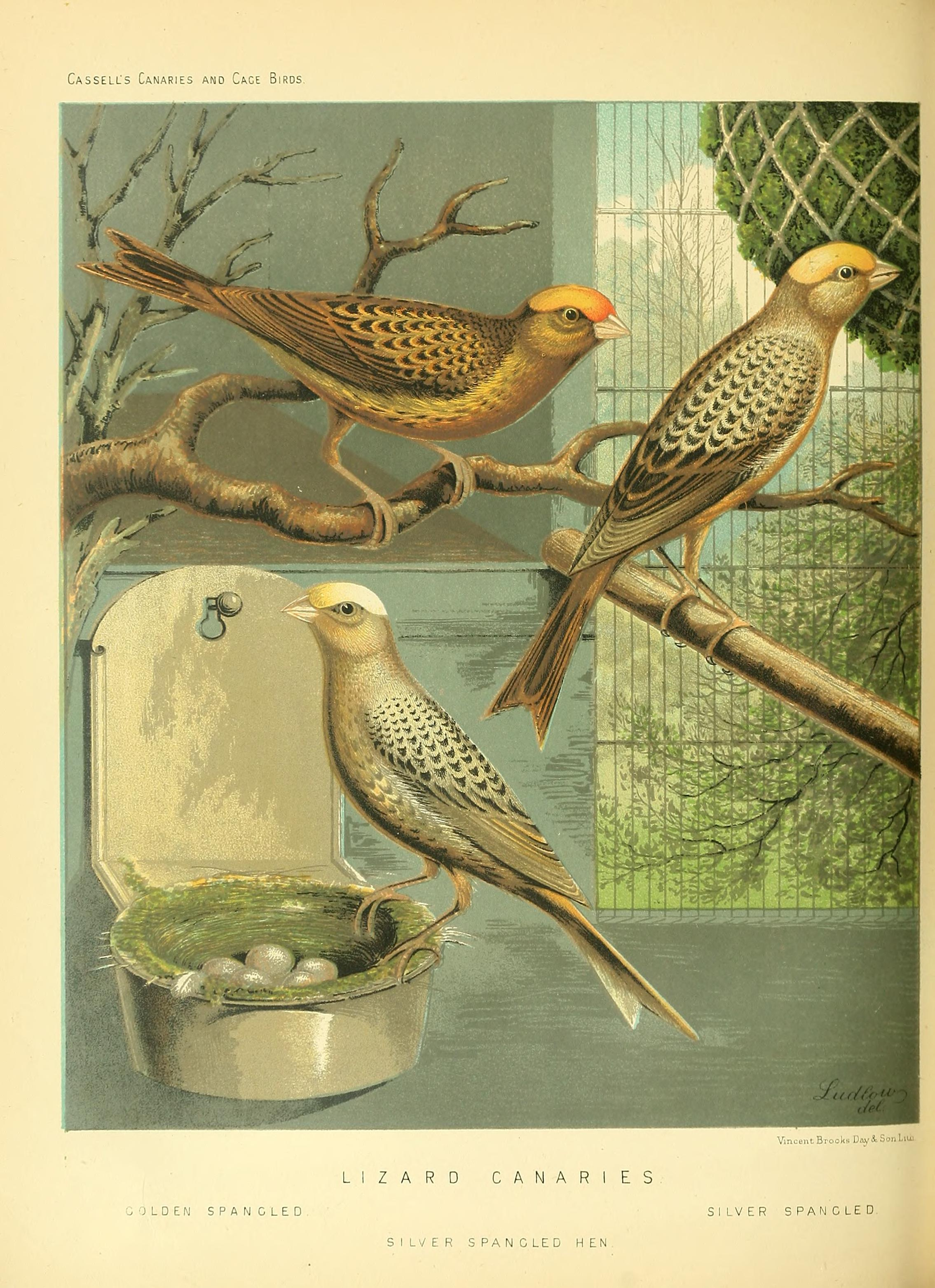
1878 illustration of the Lizard

Smooth-feathered canaries (large)

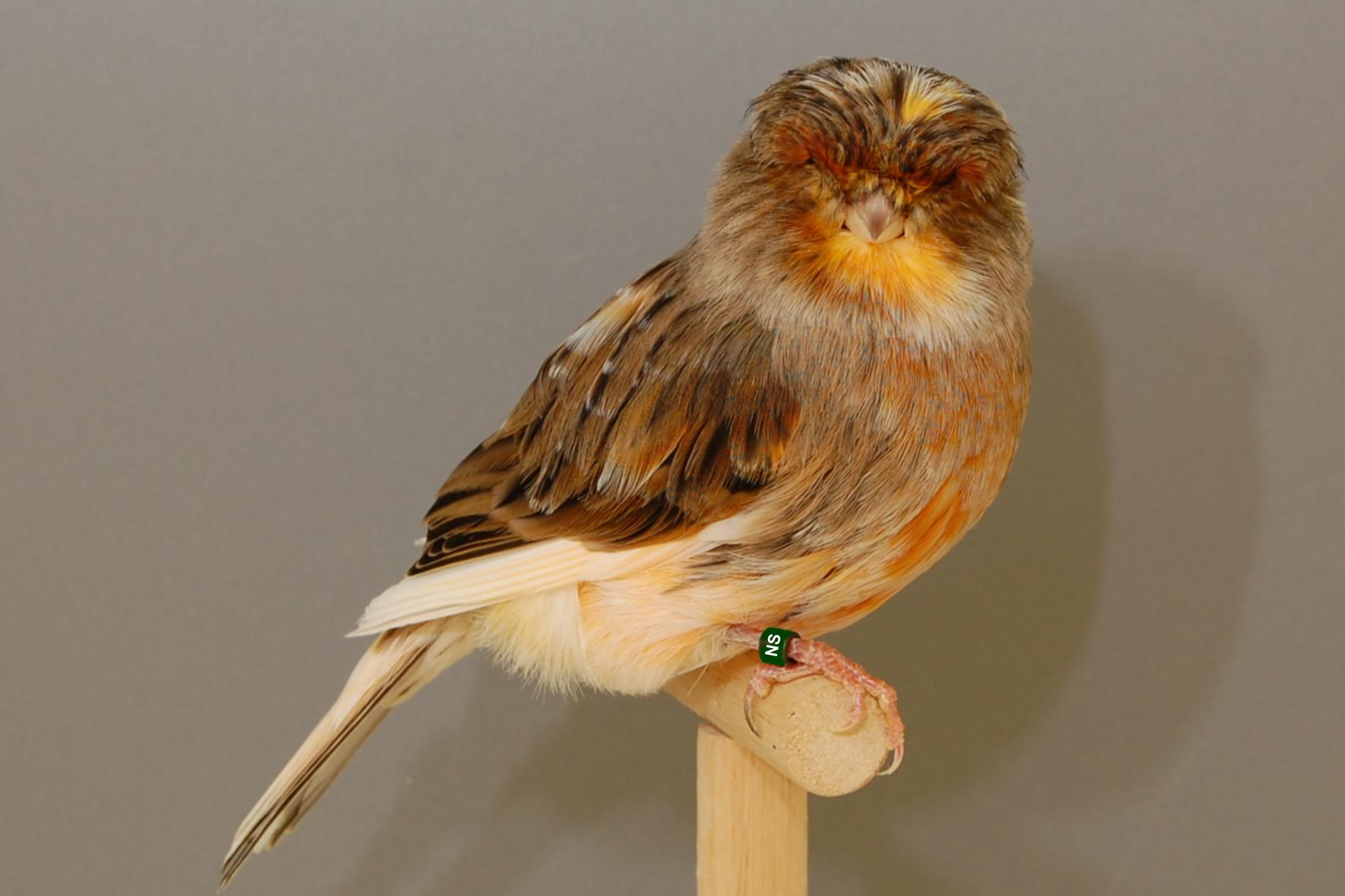
A Norwich canary

The Norwich canary is a breed with a compact, stocky or "bulky" build, and a length of approximately 6.5", in all sorts of colours. The ideal Norwich is described as having a very short neck and nape, a curvy belly, and a broad back, with rounded shapes on all sides (it gained the affectionate nickname of John Bull), and thick fur. It also has an abundance of feathers, which has caused the unintentional effect of covering part of the eyes on some Norwich canaries. This is not standardised, nor permitted under animal welfare reasons. The modern Norwich was standardised in 1890; an older type of Norwich, which was smaller and known for its reddish-yellow colour, originated in the city of Norwich and believed to have entered England through Calvinists who fled to the country from the Spanish Netherlands. It was very popular in 19th century England. One writer in 1906 claimed that the Norwich "sings the best" among the English canary breeds. These old Norwich canaries bear little resemblance to today's. Breeders in Australia, who liked the old style Norwich, developed the Australian plainhead breed.

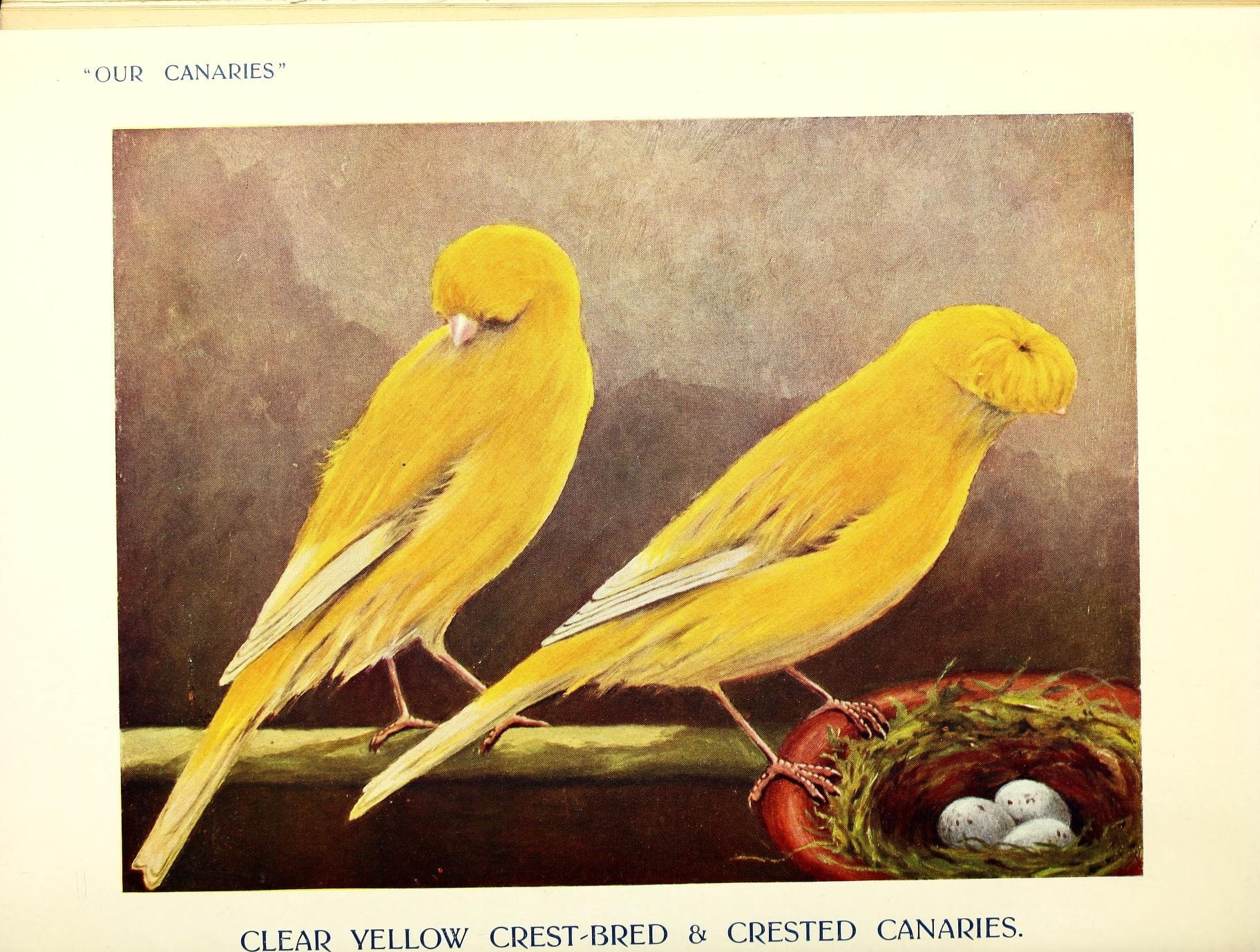
The English Crested Canary, in Crestbred and Crested forms

Tied with the history of the Norwich is the Crested Canary (also called Crest Canary), which was originally called the Crested Norwich. Enthusiasts of this type crossbred with the Lancashire Coppy that altered and formed its distinctive crest. These birds were exhibited first in 1879. While they ended up becoming popular, their prices grew to exorbitant numbers by the 1920s. The crest feathers flow in a circular pattern from a centre point on its head, and partially drapes on the tip of its beak and eyes (without obstructing the bird's vision). The Crested is a minimum of 6.75" long. Another English breed is the Cinnamon Canary, a very old breed that was originally bred for its dun or dull-brown colour (likened to cinnamon) before it was interbred with the Norwich. While cinnamon-coloured Norwich canaries exist today, breeders of the Cinnamon Canary argue that it remains distinct enough.

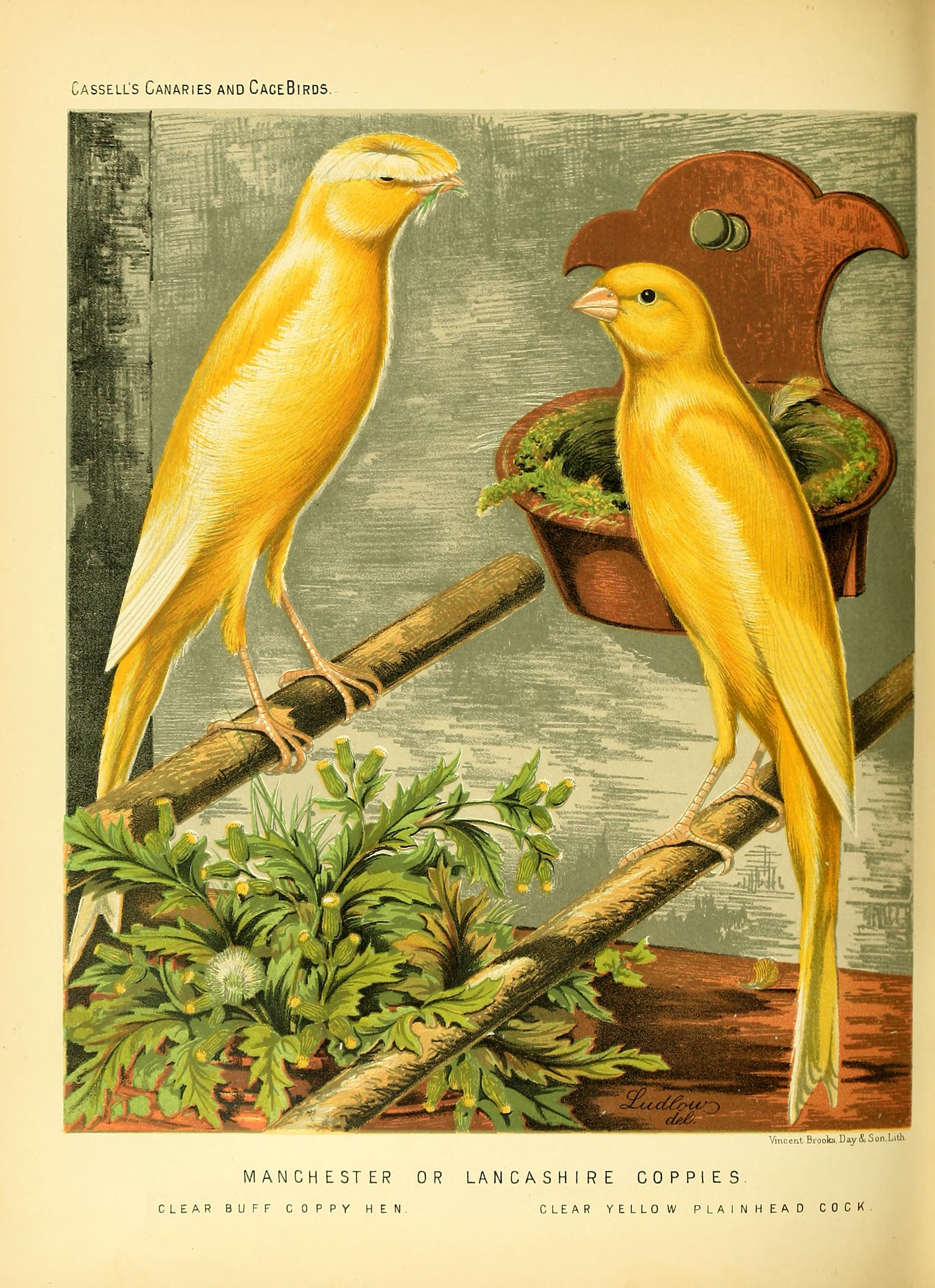
Lancashire coppy and plainhead, depicted in an 1878 illustration

The Lancashire Canary (originally named Manchester Fancy) is the largest of all English breeds, upstanding erect at approximately 8 inches tall and appearing giant compared to ordinary canaries. The Lancashire may also have a crest ("Coppies") or not have one ("Plainheads"). Lancashires are permitted to be either yellow or white. It has a full chest and broad shoulders. They have been used by breeders to add size to other varieties of canaries. The Lancashire is believed to have originated from an older breed brought into England by Flemings in the 18th century. The old breed disappeared and became extinct after the Second World War. After this, a number of breeders managed to reconstruct it using existing Crested and Yorkshire canaries, which still carried genetic material of the old Lancashire.

The Yorkshire Canary is a breed with an upright stance (an approximate angle of 80°), long legs, long folded tail, and a "full" head. It was first developed in Bradford in the mid-19th century, with breeders aiming to improve upon the Lancashire canary by making it thinner and sleeker. However, as time has gone on, the Yorkshire has shed its original slim form in favour of a beefier type with rounder head, and these are now favoured among breeders. They are bred in all colours and are a minimum of 6.75". Related to the Yorkshire is the Bernese Canary (Berner/Bernois), originating from Switzerland. While its ancestry is not clear, the Bernese was developed with help from the old Yorkshire, and now has distinct characteristics.

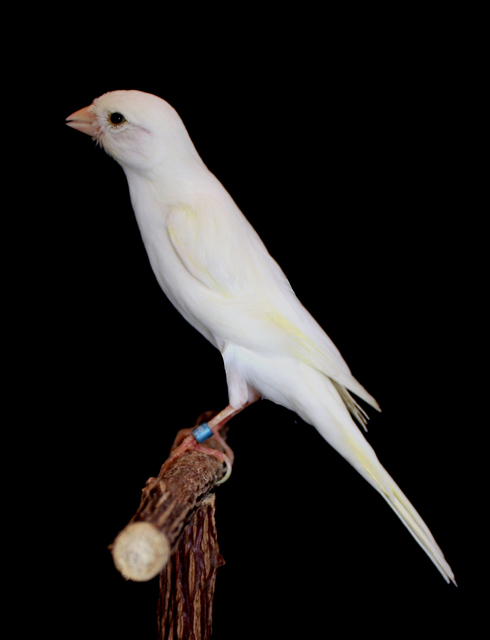
Llarguet canary in white

Llarguet Español is a breed with an elongated, slender body, a small head and long legs. It has a minimum length of 17 centimetres (6.7 in) and stands at about 60° from the perch. Developed around the mid-20th century (and officially recognised since 2003), "Llarguet" is Catalan for "long". The Persian Rasmi is a long and thin breed, standing naturally at a 50° angle and as long as 9" in length. Its unique striking feature is its tail, which in the best examples would be even longer than the canary's body. The Rasmi was developed from a Yorkshire, Lancashire and Spanish Giboso, and first bred in Iran in the late 1970s, Its Persian name is Rasmi Boland ( رسمی بلند). A relatively newer breed is the Portuguese Harlequin (Portuguese: Arlequim Português), becoming recognised by the COM in 2010. Its main characteristics are its triangular chest, and its mottled plumage in many different colours. It stands at about 60° with its head held high, and is measured at 16 centimetres (6.3 in) .

Posture canaries

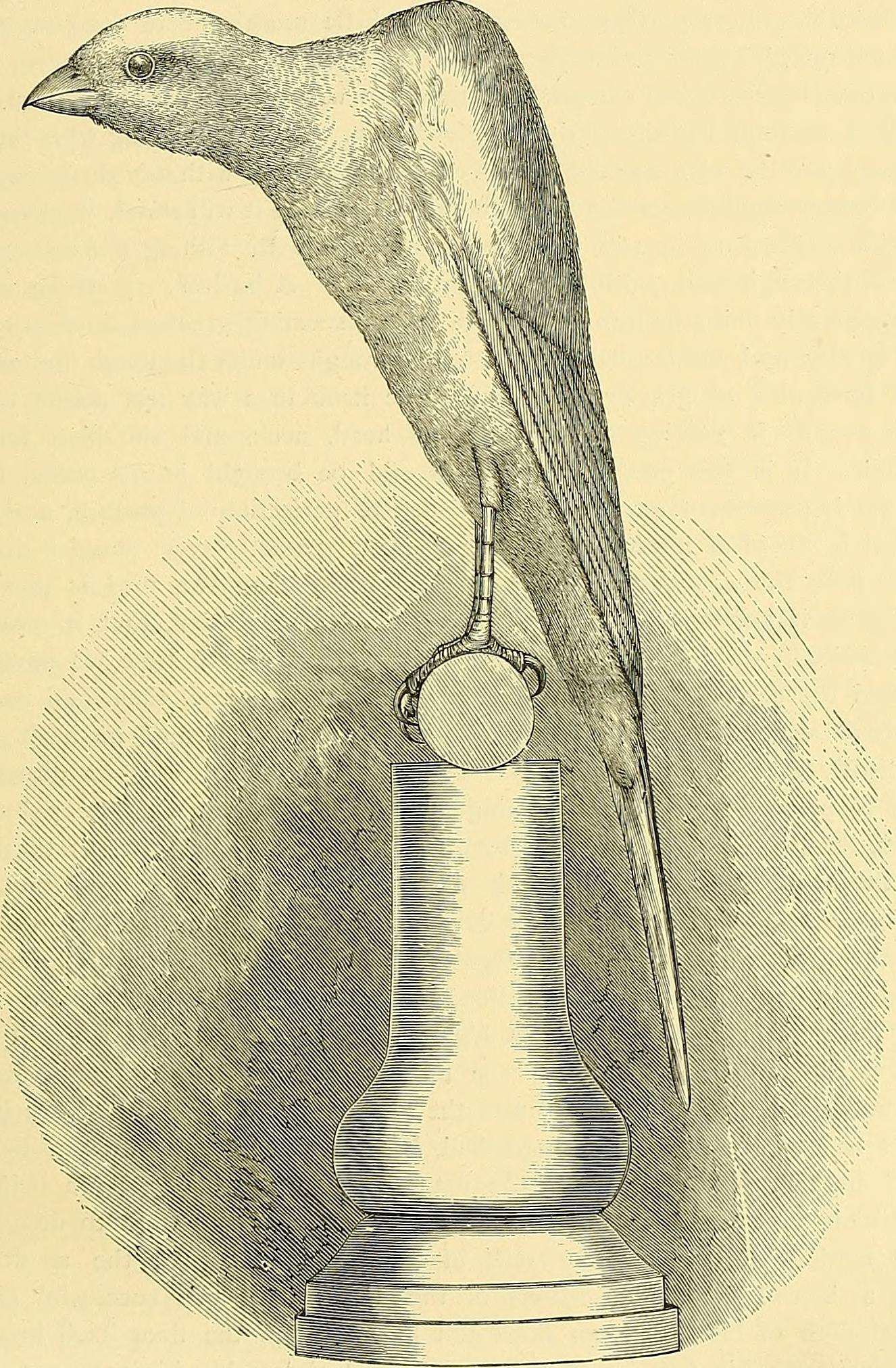
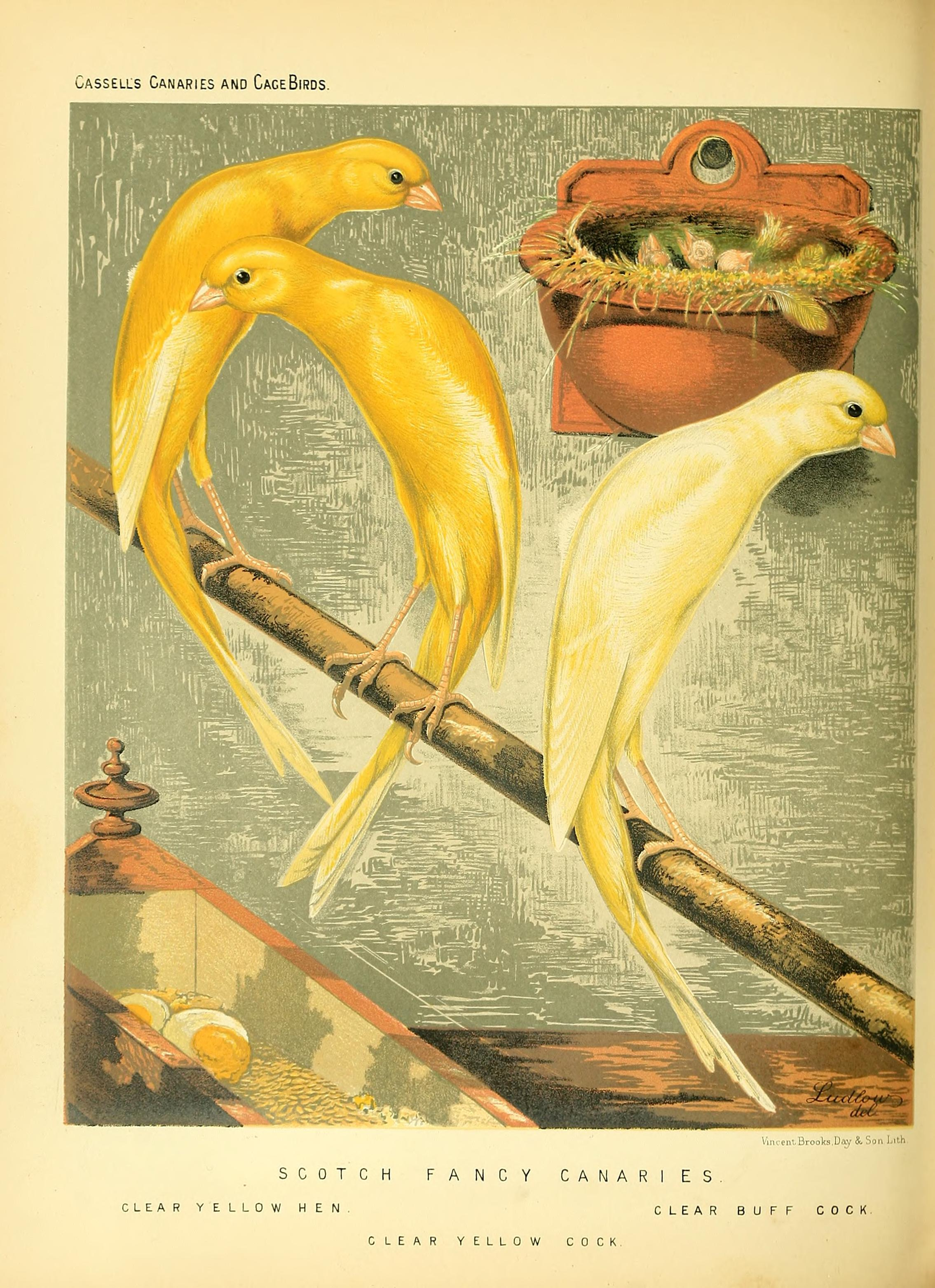
1878 illustrations of the Belgian canary (left) and the Scots Fancy canary (right)

All curved posture birds probably go back to the Belgian Fancy, also known as the Belgian Hunchback or Belgian Canary (French: Bossu Belge, Dutch: Belgisch Bult). It has a long neck, an arched back, high prominent and tucked shoulders and relatively small head. It has been described as being "vulture"-like in shape. By the 1900s, the Belgian was rare, with the First World War contributing further to the loss of the specimen in Belgium, leading it to the verge of extinction. Late in the century, the Belgian has experienced a revival amongst breeders. They measure about 6.75" in length.

The Scots Fancy (also known as Scotch Fancy) is known for its bend-back C-shaped posture. Breeders have attempted to make it as close as possible to a semi-circle. This breed was developed from the Belgian canaries in the 19th century and was originally named 'The Glasgow Don'. They measure at least 6.75" long. Along with its curved tail, the Scots is distinct from the Belgian with its narrow shoulders and a narrow rounded back.

The Munich canary (Münchener), originating from Germany, stands at an angle of 45° with a slim body shape and a long neck tilted forward. The Japan Hoso has a posture similar to the Scots Fancy and is no larger than 11.5 centimetres (4.5 in). The Salentino is a newer breed that is similar to the Belgian but has a crest. It was recognised as a breed by the COM in 2020.

Frill canaries

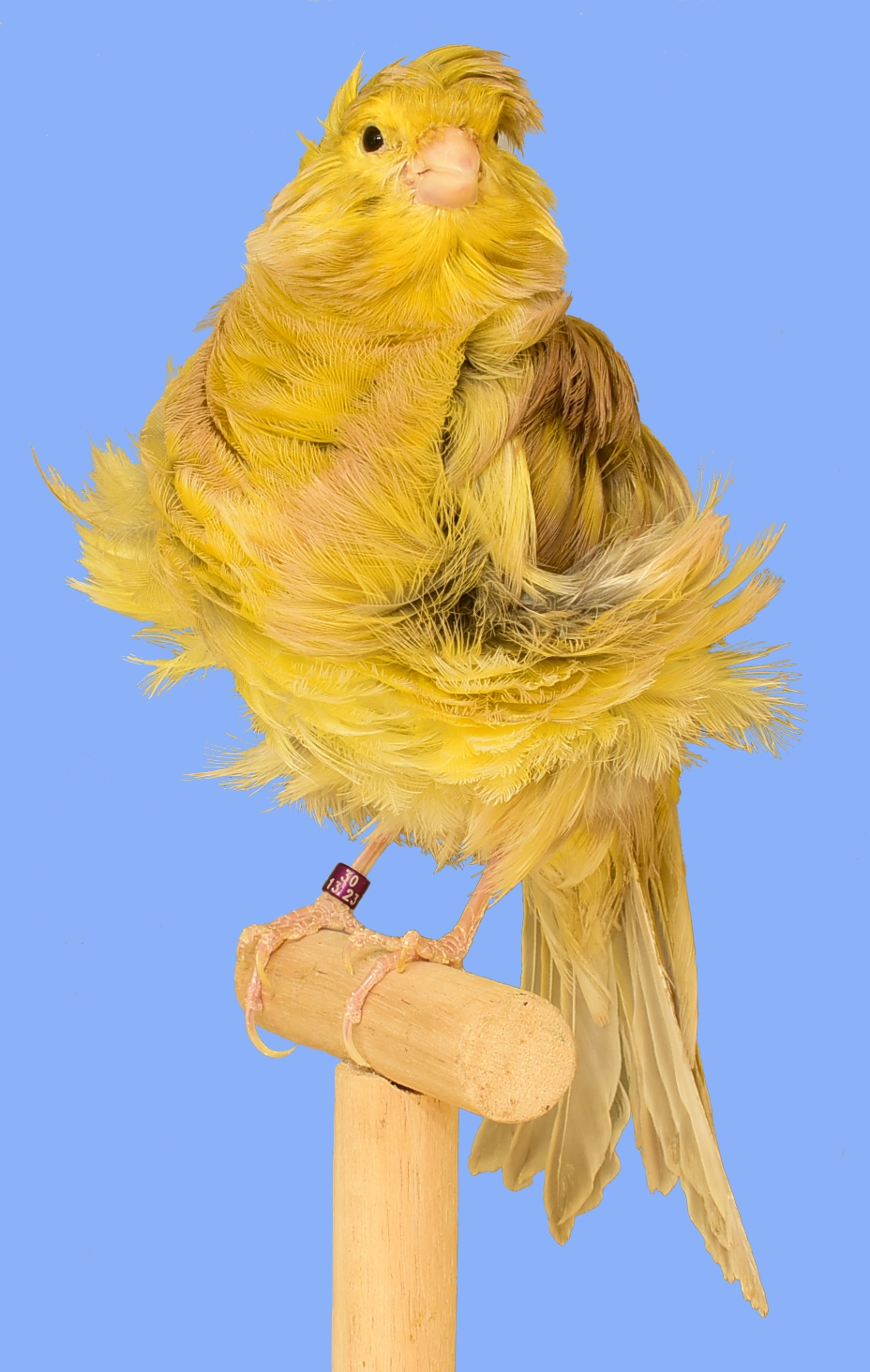
Parisian Frill

Frill canaries, or coiffed canaries, feature unusual twisted and wavy feathers that may be anywhere on the canary's body. The first mention of the "curly" or "Dutch" canaries can be found in 1852 in a piece by Jules Janin, writing that such birds were introduced to France from Holland and Belgium "20 years ago." However its exact origins are not exactly clear, though it is possible that they may have originated around Roubaix and Lille, in northern France.

The North Dutch Frill canary (also called Northern Frill, North Hollander, or Dutch Fancy) has frilling in a band around the centre of its body. It has a notable contrast between the styling on its back, chest and wings. Its body length is 17 to 18 centimetres (7.1 in), making it one of the larger of the frill canaries. It is not clear if they were first bred in North Holland (as its name would otherwise suggest) and more likely is in the Belgian-French border region; its Dutch name is Noord Hollandse Frisé while in French it is known as Frisé du Nord, the latter of which is the official name recognised by the COM.

The Parisian Frill (Frisé Parisien) is a canary that was first bred around the 1850s in France, although was standardised in 1920. It notably has every part of its body styled which creates a variety of different plumage looks. The breed has been highly popular for its chic wavy look. The Parisian Frill is also large, with a length between 19 centimetres (7.5 in) and 21 centimetres (8.3 in).

Since the North Dutch and Parisian, further breeds appeared later on. The Mehringer is a frill canary designed to be a miniature Parisian Frill; it does not exceed 13 centimetres (5.1 in) in length but retains the same coiffed styles. It originated with German breeder Karl Franke in the 1980s, who named it after his hometown of Mehring. The Italian Giant Frill (Italian: Arricciato Gigante Italiano (AGI)) is another breed that was developed from the Parisian. Its feathers point towards the canary's head, and it has a distinct round "rose" style on its back, unlike the vertical parting on the Parisian. Another Italian breed, a smaller variant of the AGI, is the Rogetto.

The Padovano canary, named after Padua, is an upright standing frill canary with a crest. This was done by crossbreeding the Parisian Frill and the English Lancashire Coppy and Crested breeds. Another breed in this category, also from Italy, is the Fiorino, a small, crested canary developed from the North Dutch and the Gloster.

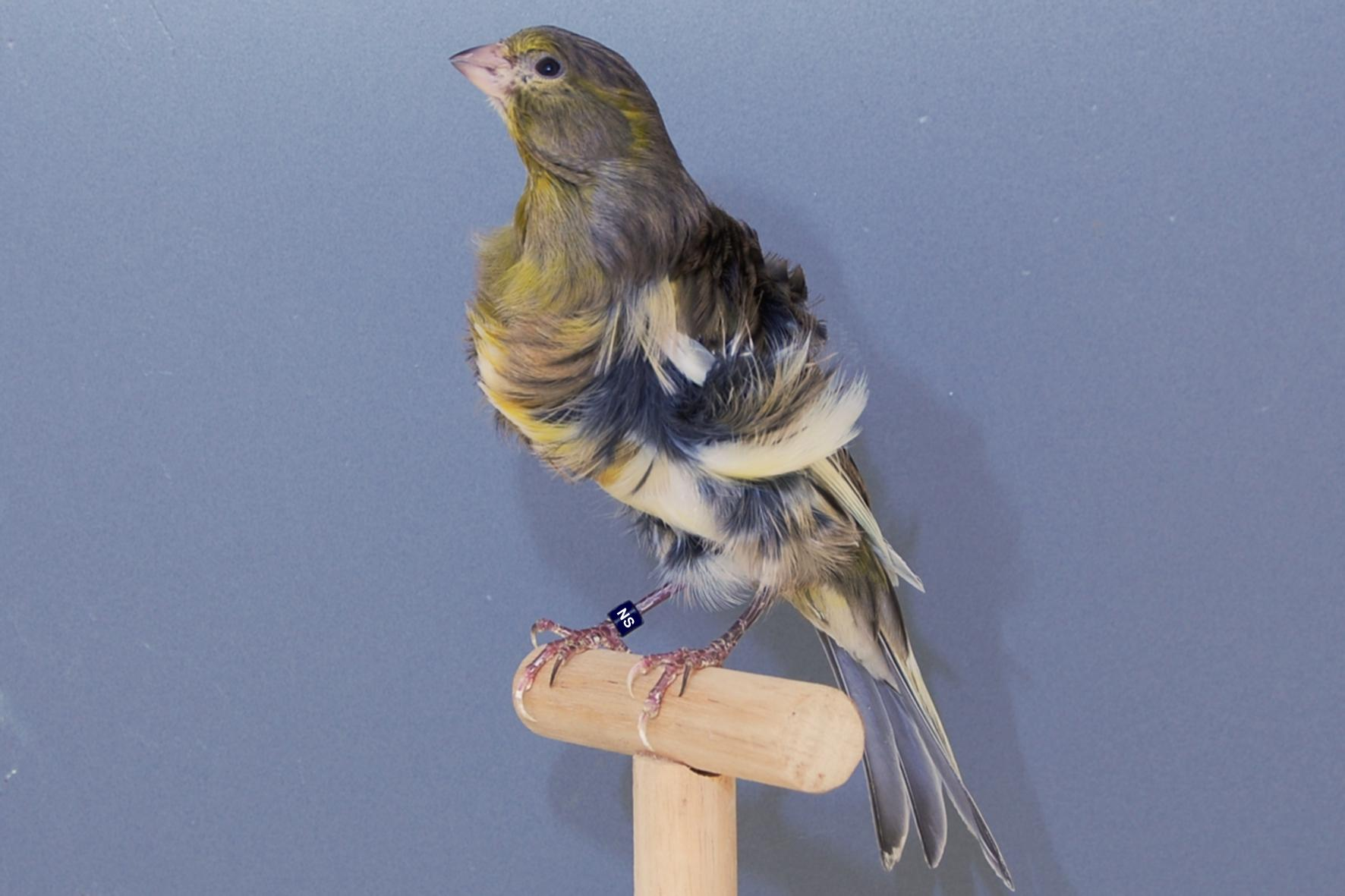
Fiorino

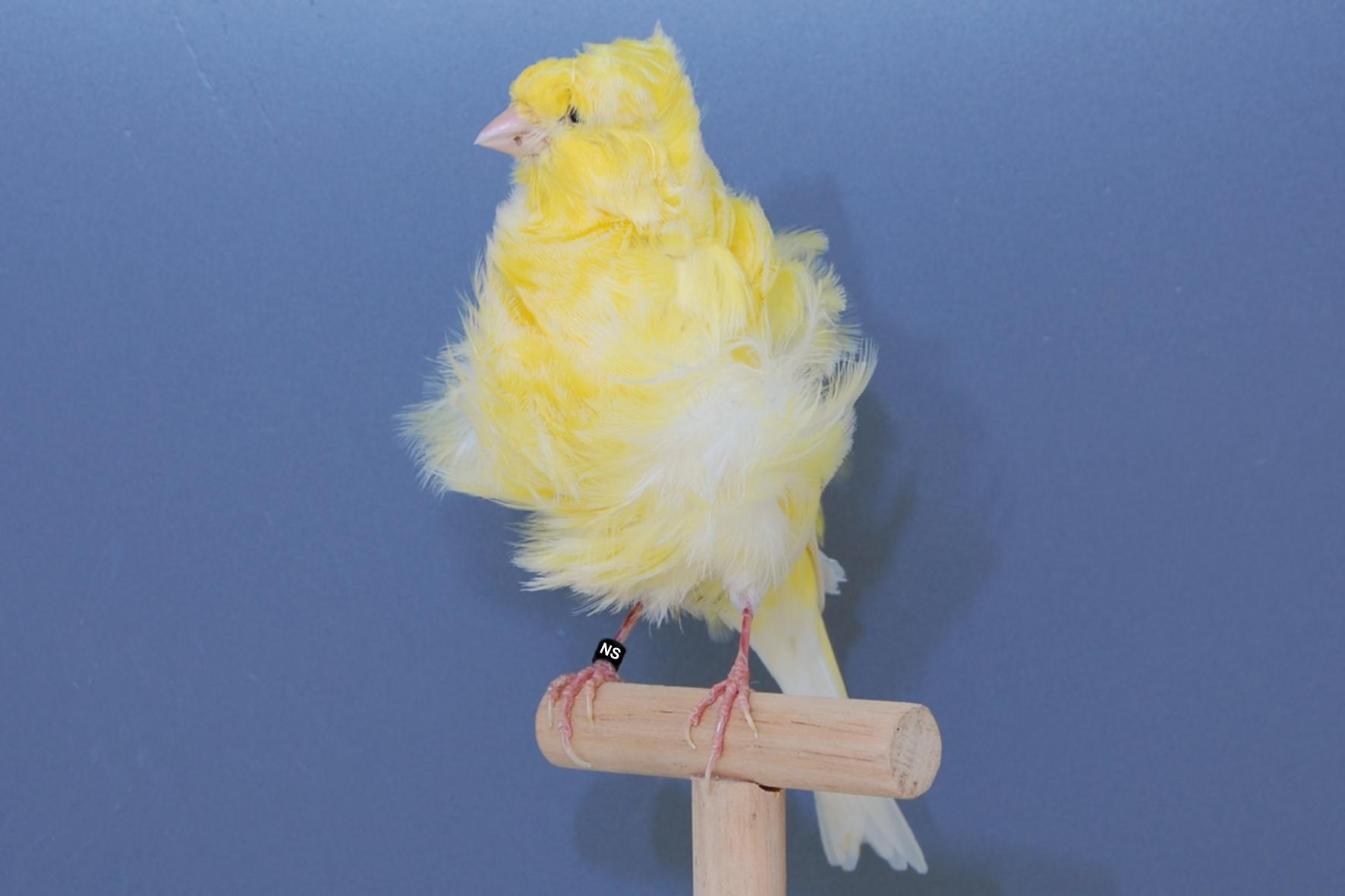
Mehringer in yellow lipochrome

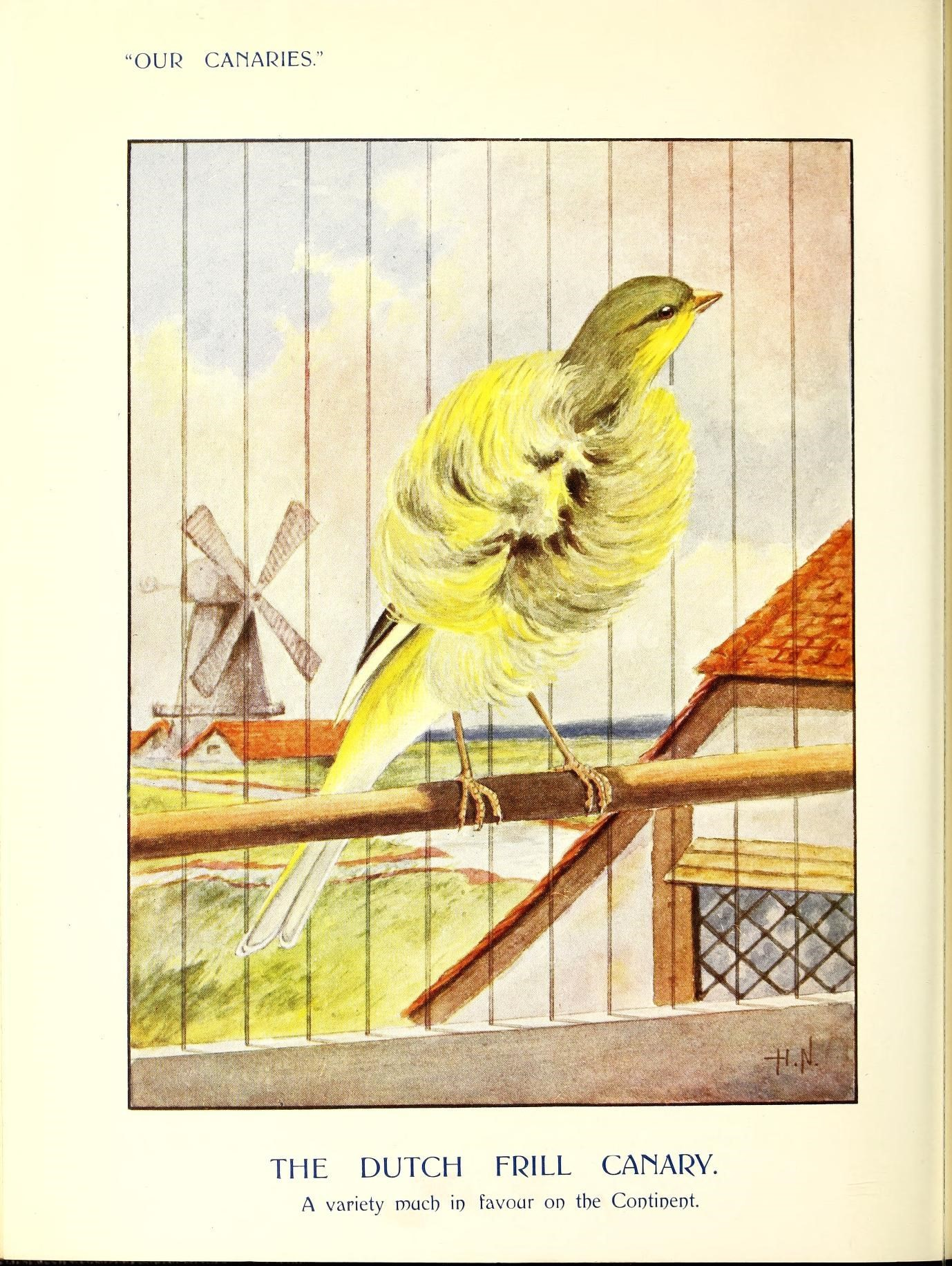
The 'Dutch Frill', 1911 illustration

Posture and Frill canaries

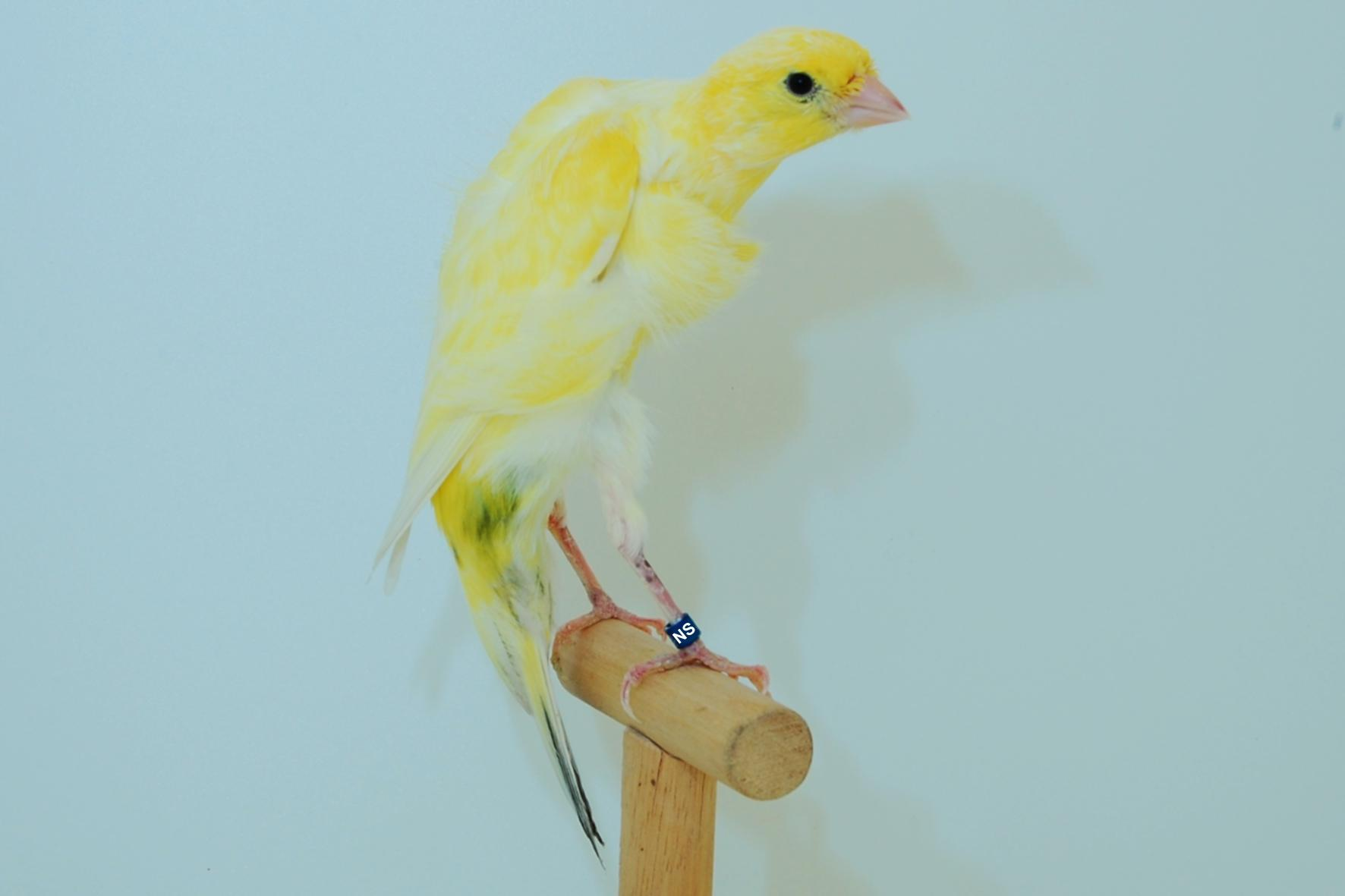
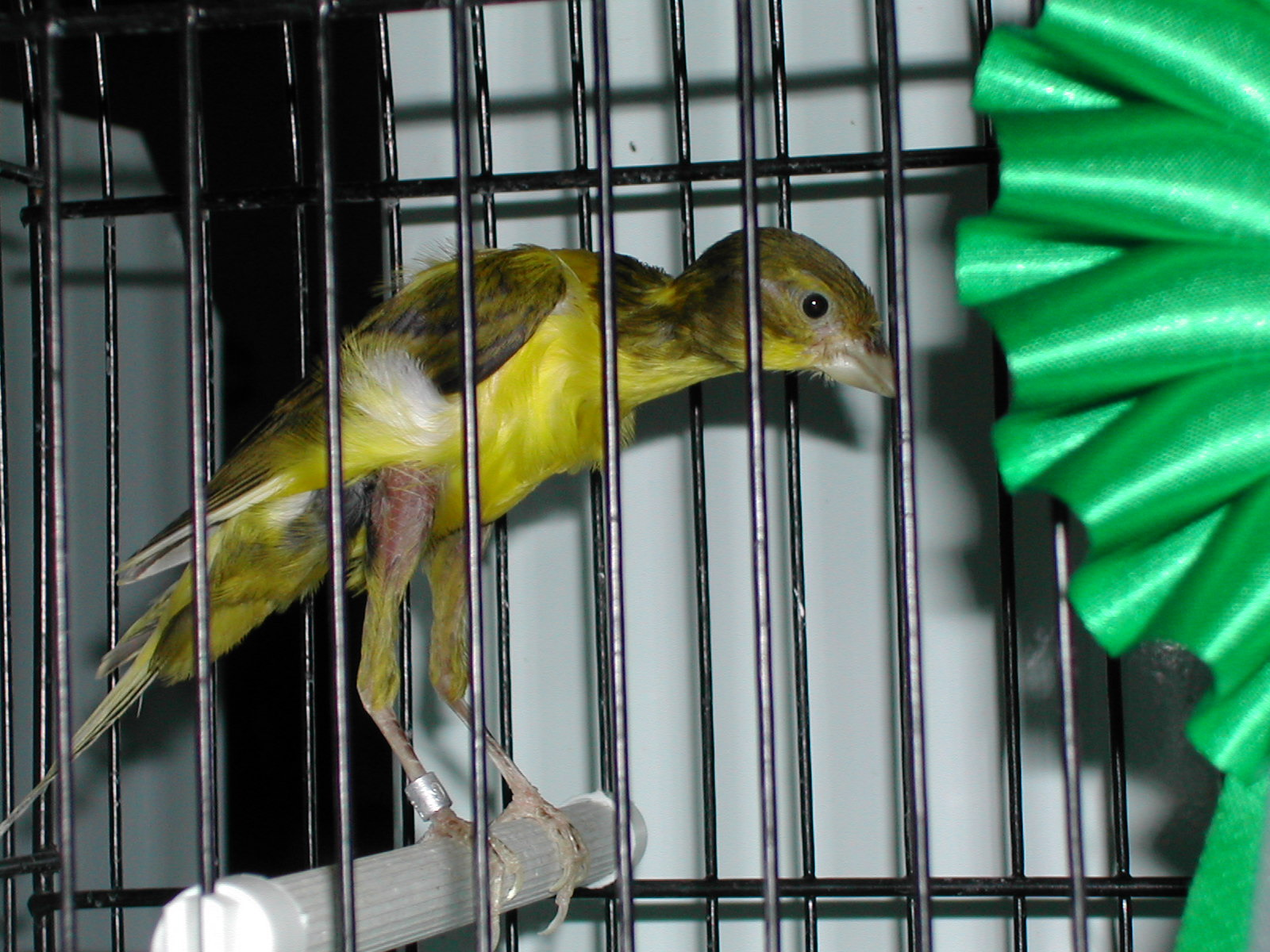
South Dutch Frill in yellow lipochrome (left) and Gibber Italicus (right)

In addition to the above, numerous breeds exist that combine the frilled plumage with shape and posture features. The South Dutch Frill (also known as Southern Frill or South Hollander) is a breed with a hunchback and emaciated build but with the style of frill present in the North Dutch canary. Measuring 17 centimetres (6.7 in) in length, it was likely the result of a crossbreed between the Belgian Fancy and the older Roubaix. Despite its name, the breed is not believed to have originated in the Netherlands (in the 19th century, all frilled canaries carried the name "Dutch", possibly in reference to a women's hairstyle). Its French name is Frisé du Sud. Swiss breeders who obtained the Parisian Frill in the 1870s later created a breed somewhat similar to the South Duch, called the Swiss Frill. The Swiss has a sickle shape in working position, similar to a Scots Fancy.

Another breed of the frill and posture type is the Gibber Italicus (also named Italian Humpback Frill), a canary with a distinctive humpback, "balding" and skinny appearance that has been described as the "greyhound" of canaries. This unusual breed originated in Italy by inbreeding of the older South Dutch Frill. Standing on long and straight, stiff legs, its posture forms a figure similar to the number '7', and its neck is long and stretched forward. It has shorter plumage than other breeds. The Gibber Italicus measures about 14 centimetres (5.5 in) to 15 centimetres (5.9 in). First exhibited in 1951 by a Lombardian breeder, the breed has been relatively popular in Italy (particularly southern), although it has not gained much popularity in Germany partly due to prejudice; it has been described as an example of "cruel breeding". Despite its rather bizarre appearance, the Gibber Italicus is as lively as other breeds of canaries.

Numerous more breeds have been developed in this category. The Spanish Giboso (Giboso Español) is a breed similar to the Gibber Italicus, although it is noticeably larger (minimum 17 centimetres (6.7 in)), with a longer neck that is bent downwards at an 45º-60º angle. It has a bare breastbone. Another Spanish breed is the Melado Tinerfeño which dates back to about 1850, its name referring to Tenerife. It was recognised as a breed by the COM in 2002. Giraldillo Seviliano is another breed from Spain, which is a Giboso with a crested breed, and officially recognised by C.O.M. since 2021. Other breeds in this category are the Benacus from Italy (officially recognised since 2023) and the Makige (also called Japanese Frill) which is not recognised.

=== Hybridisation ===
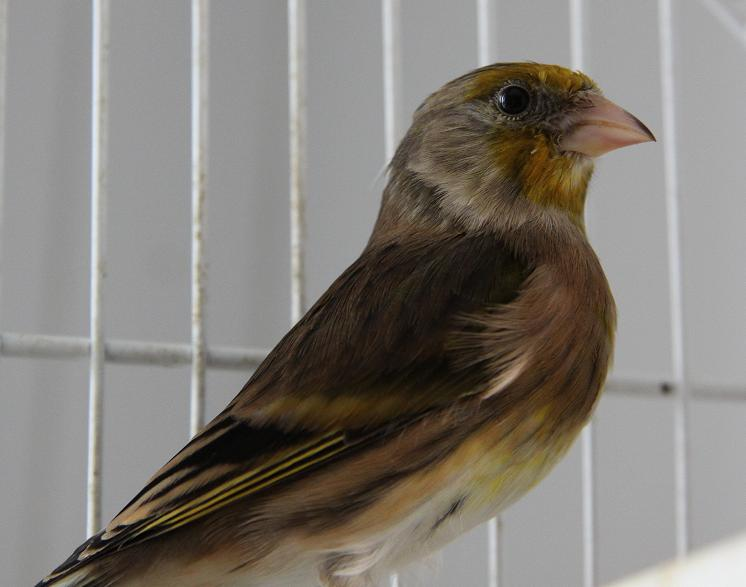
Hybrid of a canary and goldfinch

The canary crosses easily with other birds in the finch family. Some hybrids are sterile, such as the one resulting from the cross between a canary and an elegant goldfinch, called a "mule" by analogy with the hybrid of a donkey and a mare. Cross-breeds with the goldfinches were noted to be popular. Others are fertile. Indeed, a cross between a canary and a Venezuelan red siskin produces orange-red hybrids. These hybrids, through selection and crossing with canaries, will produce red canaries. The canary is regularly hybridised with the goldfinch, the bullfinch (always a male canary with a female bullfinch in this case), the European greenfinch, etc.

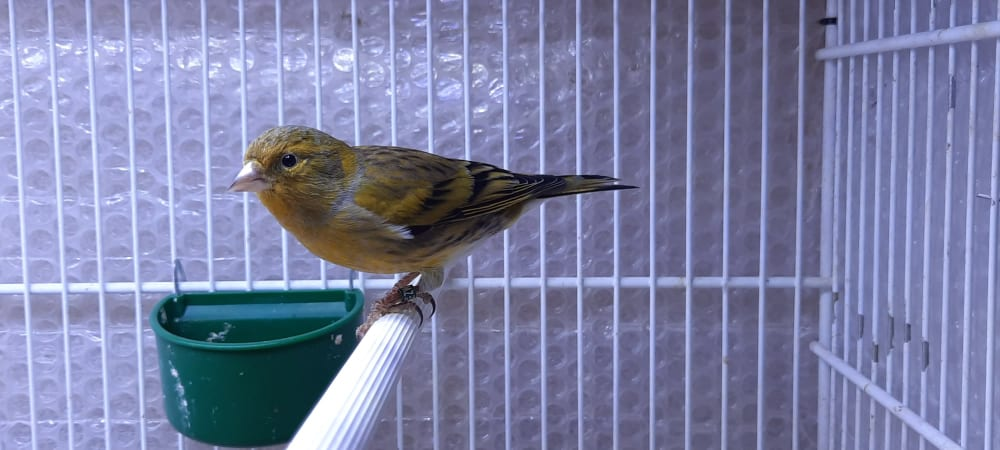
A male hybrid of a canary and a Eurasian siskin

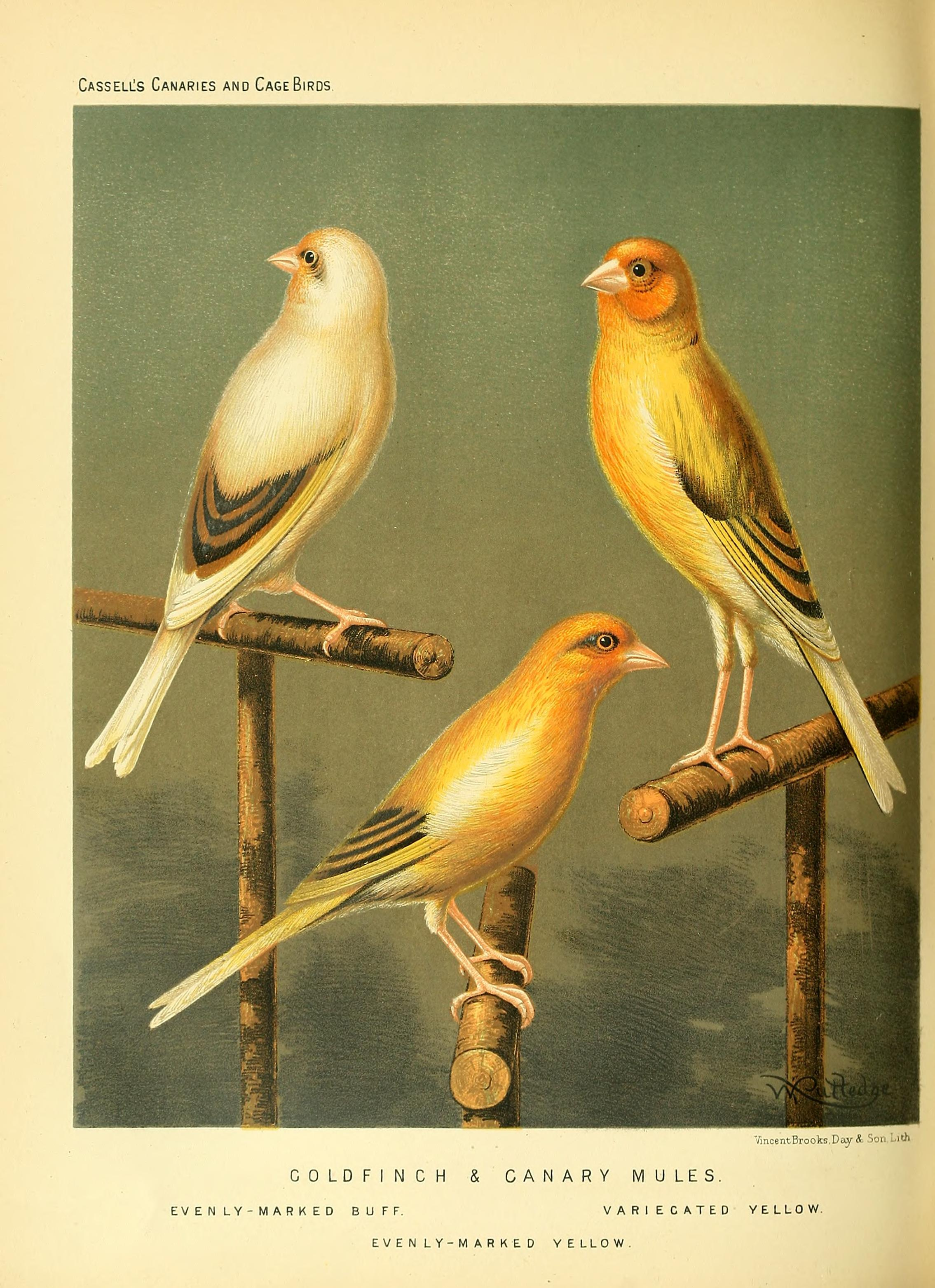
Canary and goldfinch hybrid illustration

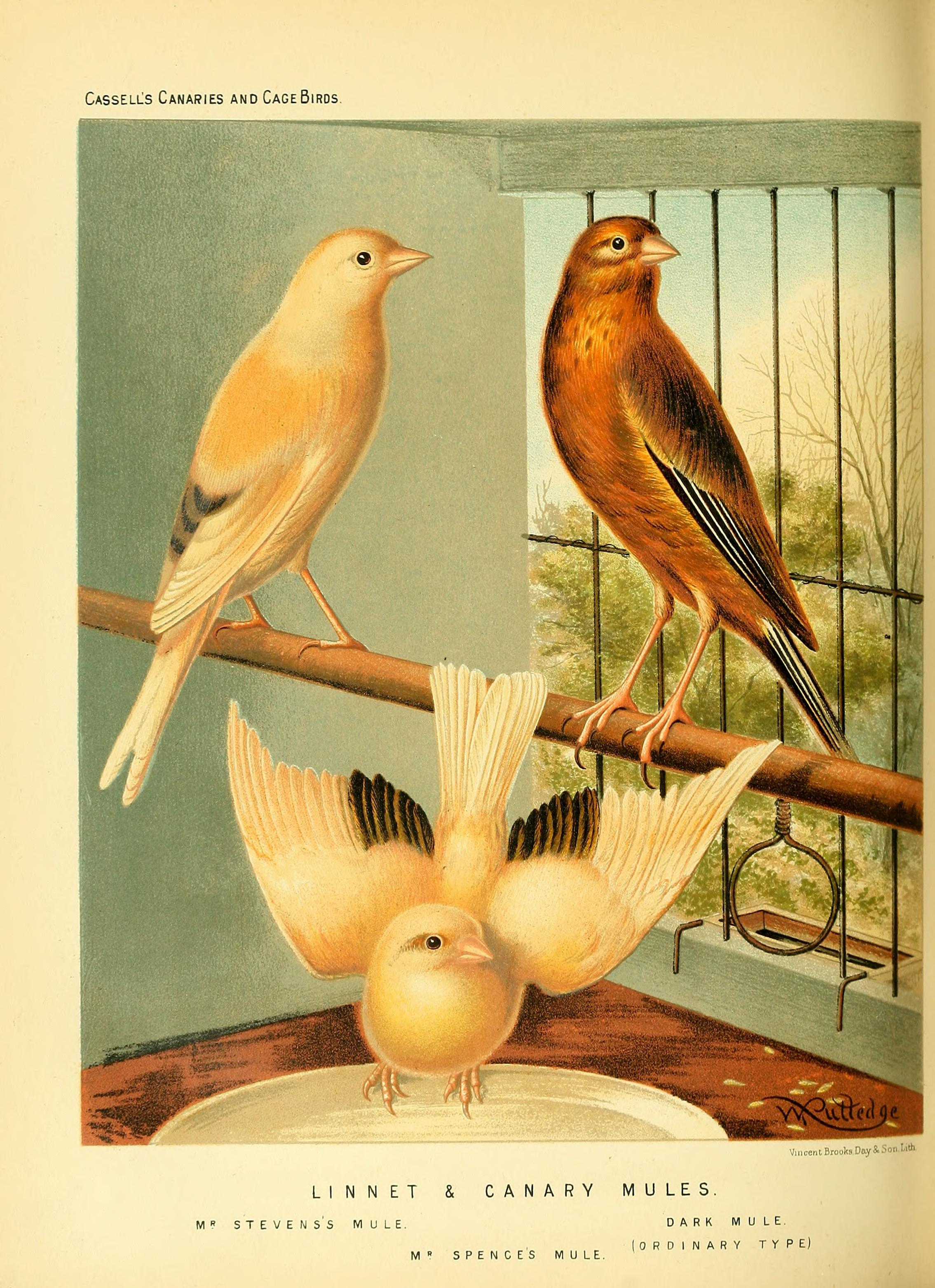
Canary and linnet hybrid illustration

== History and popularity ==
Historically, the canary had been popular due to its song, making it a staple in the residencies of aristocrats and later common citizens. They are also generally easy to care for, and their breeding abilities (like diverse colours) as well as their ability to learn sounds for singing made them popular with breeders. In the Netherlands, it is suggested that there are several million domestic canaries. In 2009, the Nederlandse Bond van Vogelliefhebbers (an association of bird keepers and enthusiasts) delivered 600,000 canary bird rings to members. A study in Lebanon found that canaries were the most traded domestic species in the country. Canaries remain popular also in Turkey. In Northern Ireland, there was a notable increase in pet bird sales, especially canaries, during the COVID-19 lockdown period.

In many jurisdictions, there are laws in place to protect animal welfare that includes canaries. There has also been criticism against the breeding of certain canary breeds, such as the Gibber Italicus, that has been described as "cruel".

=== Domestication of the canary ===
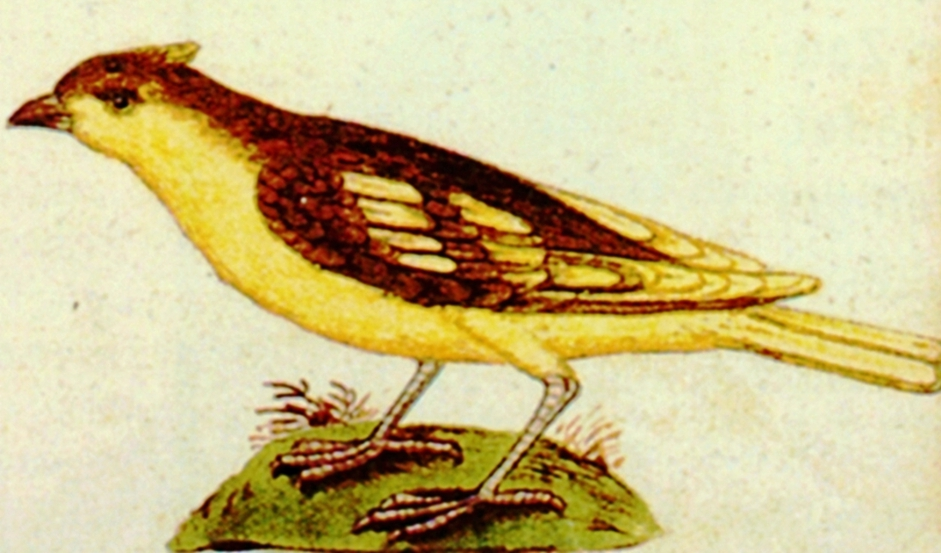
Early depiction of a yellow canary in the Thesaurus Pictuarium of Marcus zum Lamm, 1580

Canaries were possibly first brought to Europe by Spanish sailors or Portuguese explorers in the late 14th or early 15th century, following the conquests and discoveries of the Macaronesian Islands of the Azores, Madeira and the Canary Islands, in the Atlantic Ocean. They were apparently impressed by the bird's song. Because of their song and liveliness, they quickly gained great popularity and became a symbol of luxury and sophistication. The earliest documented mention of canaries is believed to be in Historia animalium in the 16th century. Canaries were first bred in captivity in the 17th century. Initially, the Spanish maintained a monopoly on the canary trade (since the Canary Islands were a possession of the Spanish Empire). This was achieved simply - the birds' habitat was kept secret, only males were sold to other countries (Portugal, England, France and Italy), and the export of females was prohibited. The males were extremely popular with aristocratic ladies and wealthy citizens because of their beautiful song. Since the monasteries expected large revenues from the trade in canaries, the monks began breeding canaries. According to legend, cited by many Italian authors, the shipwreck of a Spanish vessel transporting a batch of canaries for sale around 1550, near the port of Livorno, was the catalyst for ending the Spanish monopoly. The legend states that the escaped canaries flew from the ship to the island of Elba where they settled and interbred with local birds, eventually leading to local Italians domesticating them and opening up a flourishing trade with Tyrol, Switzerland and Germany. Giovanni Pietro Olina cited this as a fact in a work dated 1622. Eventually they were bred throughout the continent, including in Turkey during the Ottoman reign of Bayezid II.

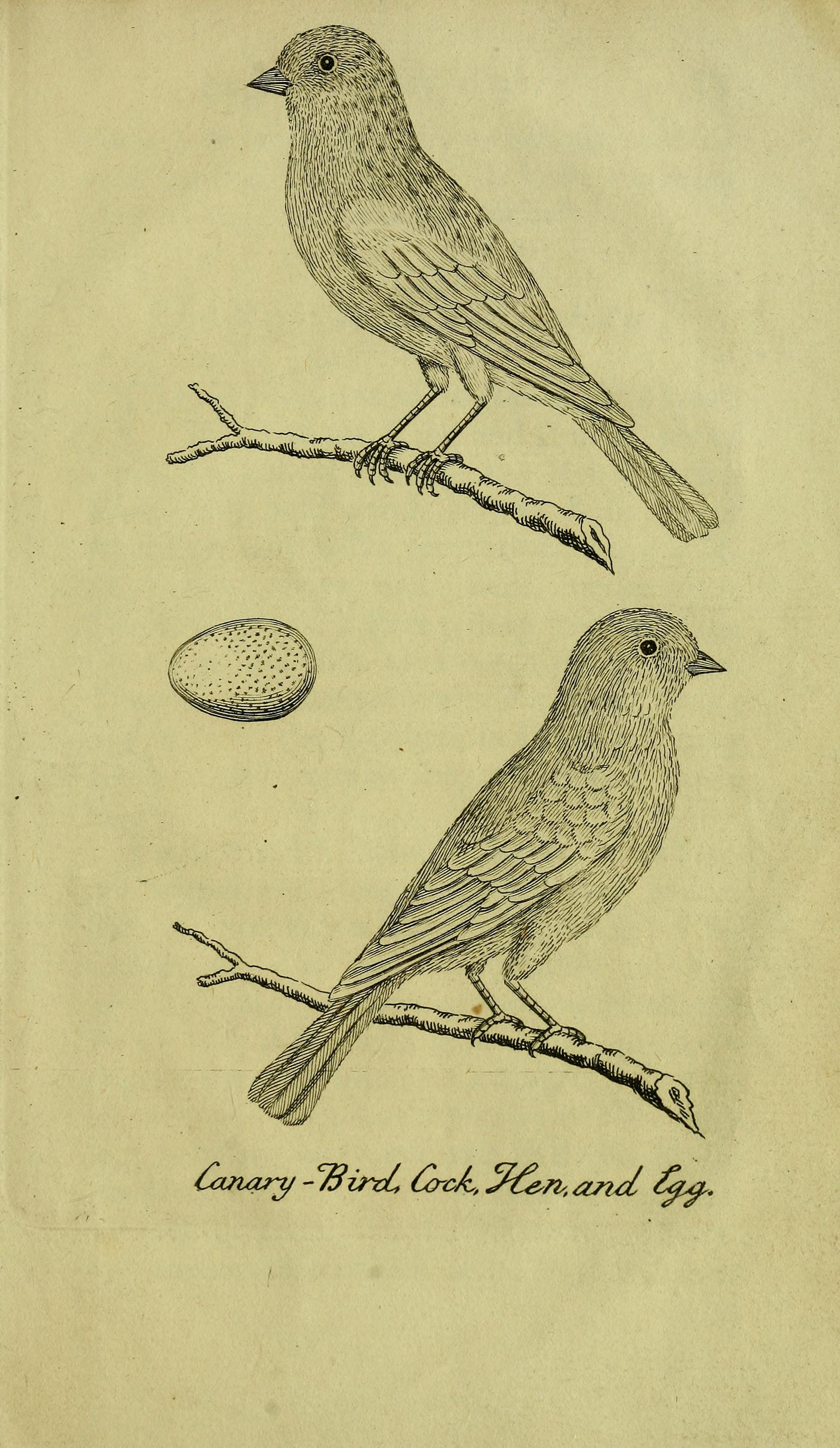
1737 drawing of a cock, hen and egg of a canary

Germany became the centre of canary culture throughout the 17th century. As early as 1600, the Tyroleans were breeding canaries, and Innsbruck, Nuremberg and Augsburg are mentioned as trading centres. It was here where the canary's transition from its wild, grey-green plumage, to a bright yellow, occurred, sometime between 1610 and 1677. The earliest possible visual evidence of a yellow coloured canary was a drawing by Strasbourg-based Johann Walter, from 1657, labelled as a canary and showing a bird with a yellow face and white wings and tail. White canaries had reportedly become commonplace in Germany by 1700. They also came up with the idea of using nightingales as lead singers for the young males. A company was founded in Imst to ship the birds all over the world. The Tyrolean bird traders travelled all over Europe with back racks on which canaries were carried in small wooden cages. Around 1700, the canaries reached Germany and the Netherlands via Tyrol. These breeders went north to the Harz Mountains from where many canaries were exported to other countries like England, including the Harz Roller, a canary bred with a special song.

Canaries became a favourite species of aviculturists for some time, bred for their plumage and distinctive song. Until the end of the 16th century, only singing canaries were bred. After that, importance was also placed on colour and finally on posture. The expansion of canary breeding was facilitated by annual exhibitions. In the Netherlands, special attention was paid to the shape of the canaries when obtaining new breeds, in England - to the colour of the canaries. Among other things, orange-red canaries were bred, for which the birds were fed food mixed with cayenne pepper during moulting. Very significant sums were paid for the best specimens. Canaries were also taught various tricks, some even learned to imitate human speech. Common canaries were fed hemp and canary seed, adding sugar, biscuits, greens, etc. Harz canaries were preferably fed a mixture of boiled egg and white bread, with the addition of crushed hemp seeds during moulting, and were also given a little canary seed and greens. Dutch breeds were fed mainly hemp, English breeds - canary seed. Charles Reiche, in his popular 1853 book The Bird Fancier's Companion, wrote that "The best singers have been raised, within the last century, on the Harz Mountain [sic], in the kingdom of Hanover, and in Thuringia, in Saxony," The birds also became popular in Russia. Peter the Great and Nicholas II were fans. In Ottoman Turkey they were also popular, and they bred a now-extinct breed called the Istanbul Canary. The first crested canaries were probably illustrated and bred around 1610, and the first posture canary was bred around 1700. The first frill canaries can be found in "The Illustrated London News" in 1858 and 1865.

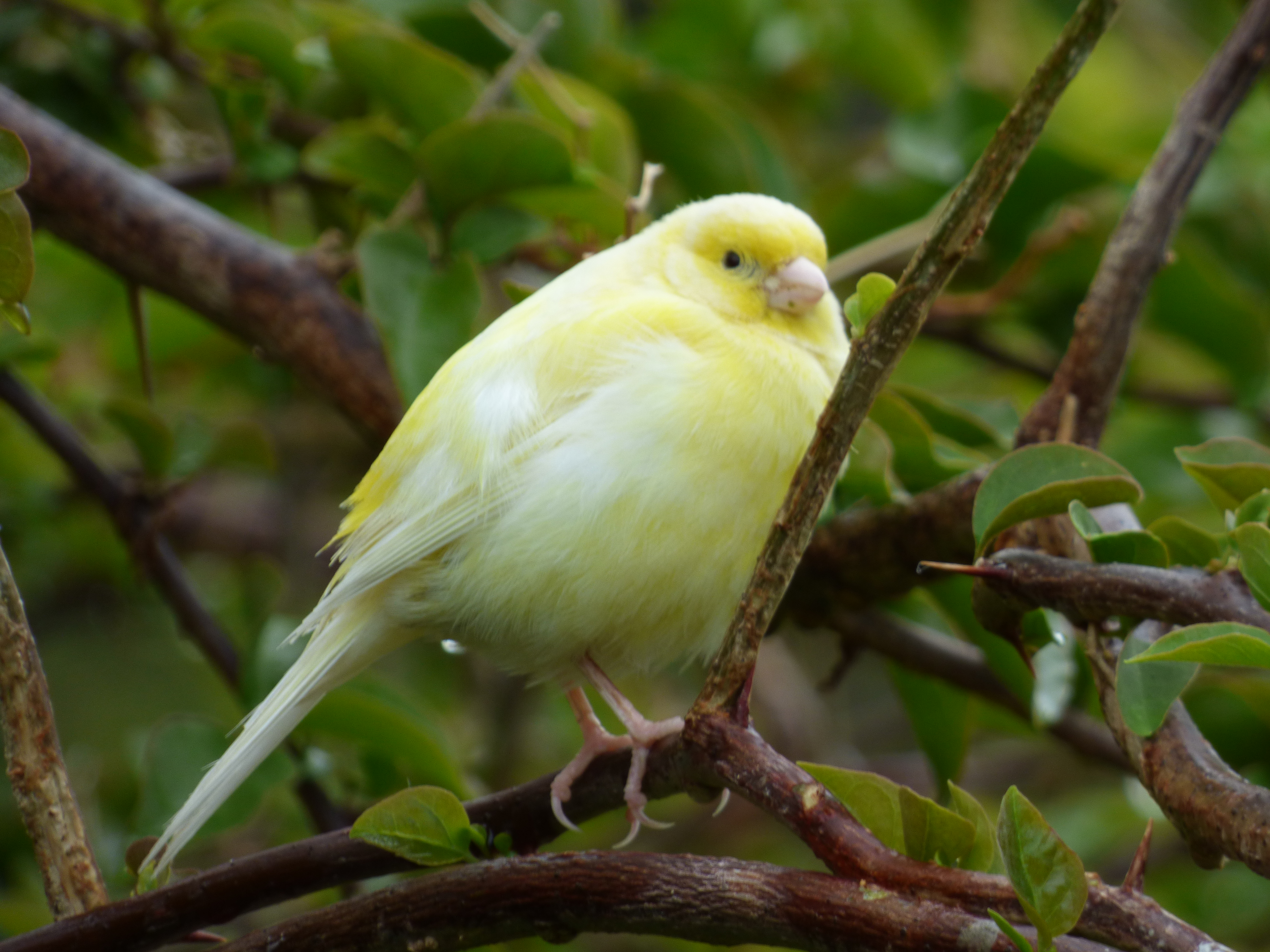
Feral yellow canary at Midway Atoll

Midway Atoll is home to a colony of feral yellow canaries, descended from pet birds introduced in 1909 by employees of the Commercial Pacific Cable Company. An estimated 500 canaries, which have retained their bright yellow plumage, are resident on Sand Island. Such canaries have also been reported in Puerto Rico, Hawaii and Bermuda.

=== In the United States ===
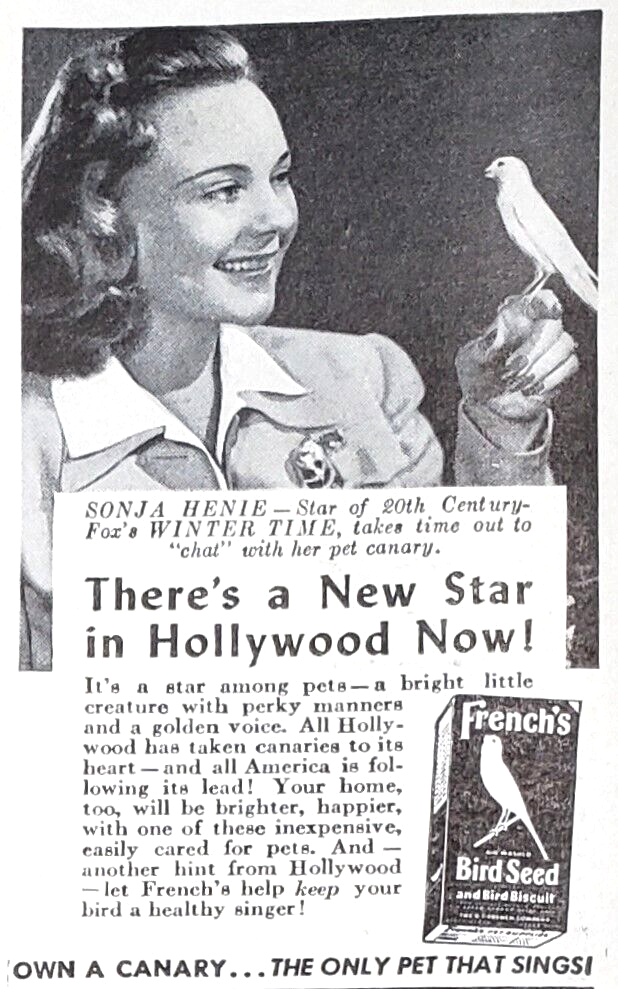
1940s canary seed advertisement

Steam power in the 19th century led to an increasing number of canaries being imported in bulk from Europe to the United States. Eventually bird stores were as common as barbershops in cities and towns across the U.S. Caged birds became highly popular as pets, and by far the most popular type was the canary. Perhaps the most successful bird traders in the country were brothers Charles and Henry Reiche, who were German immigrants and opened a bird shop near Bowery in New York City and imported thousands of canaries from Germany. As many as 3,000 were shipped to San Francisco after the California Gold Rush. By 1871, the brothers were importing 48,000 canaries annually. According to Katherine C. Grier, who published Pets in America: A History in 2006, canaries were "the pet" to have during the 19th century. Grier explains that before radio came along, caged birds provided ambient sound in households. People could also carry the cages between rooms "almost like a transistor radio". Canaries were known as the 'universal parlor bird'. They were also commonly given out as prizes at carnivals in the early 20th century.

Radio programs broadcasting live canaries singing against classical music tunes aired throughout the United States between the 1920s and 1950s. It was likely popularised by the Mutual Broadcasting System's show American Radio Warblers, featuring tunes by organist Preston Sellers and ten caged canaries in the studio. The 1946 book The First Quarter-Century of American Broadcasting wrote about radio programs with singing canaries: "appearing over too many stations to be listed here, affording hours of delightful entertainment to millions, particularly shut-ins.

Due to World War I halting the import of canaries from Europe (especially Germany and Great Britain), American enthusiasts increasingly sought to breed the birds locally, and this hobby led to the creation of clubs as those that existed in Europe. Canary imports to America peaked just before the Great Depression, in 1929. Germany and Britain going to war once again led to another decline in importing, and it never recovered to pre-Depression levels after the end of World War II. By the 1970s, partly due to changing public tastes, canaries had declined in popularity and there were now more parrots and other exotic birds being imported. In the bigger picture, by the end of the 20th century pet birds had declined significantly and now amount to only a fraction of American households who instead own cats or dogs as pets.

Five sitting U.S. presidents have kept a canary as a pet in office. The first of these was John Tyler (1841–45) and the most recent was John F. Kennedy (1961–63). The yellow canary of the Kennedys belonged to the president's daughter, Caroline, and was named Robin. Robin died in 1962 and was buried in the backyard of the White House. No sitting president since Kennedy's successor, Lyndon B. Johnson (who kept lovebirds) has kept birds in the White House.

=== Competitions ===
Dutch newsreel from 1939 of a canary song competition in The Hague

Canaries are judged in competitions following the annual molt in the summer. This means that in the Northern Hemisphere the show season generally begins in October or November and runs through December or January. Birds can only be shown by the persons who raised them. A show bird must have a unique band on its leg indicating the year of birth, the band number, and the club to which the breeder belongs.

There are many canary shows all over the world. The world show (C.O.M. - Confederation Ornithologique Mondiale) is held in Europe each year and attracts thousands of breeders. As many as 20,000 birds are brought together for this competition.

== Human use ==
=== Miner's canary ===
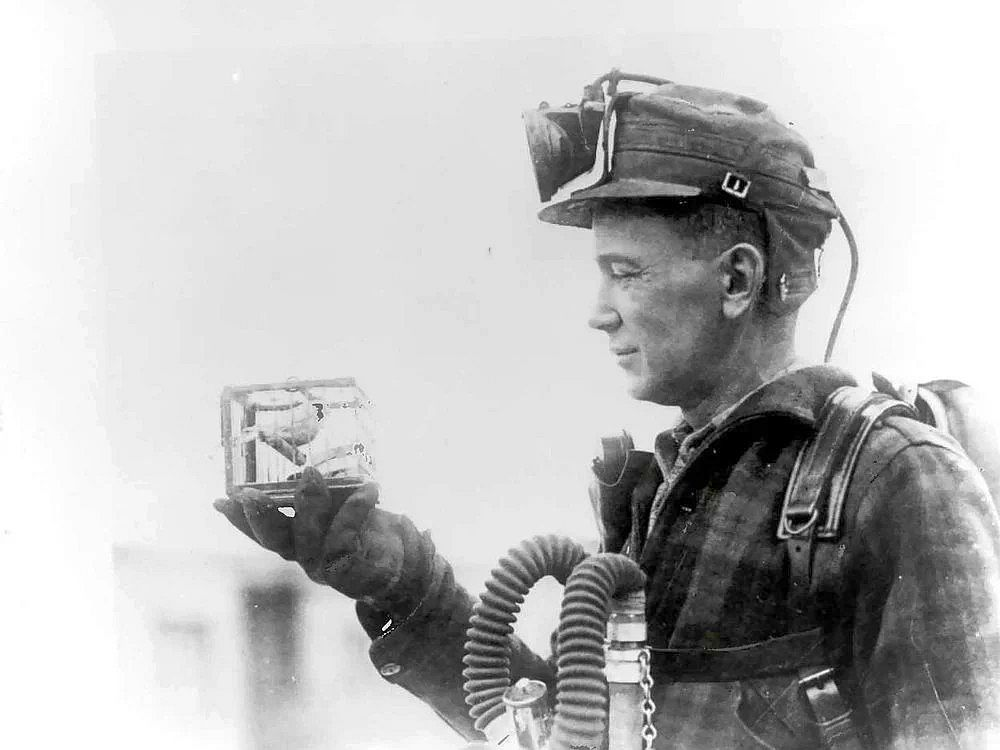
Mining foreman R. Thornburg shows a small cage with a canary used for testing carbon monoxide gas in 1928.

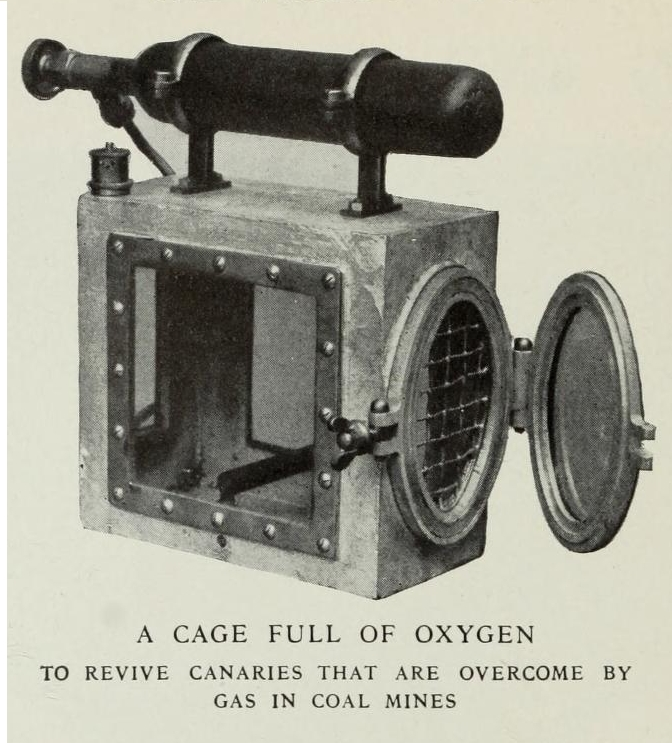
Resuscitation cage with an oxygen cylinder serving as a handle used to revive a canary for multiple uses in detecting carbon monoxide pockets within mines

Mice were used as sentinel species for use in detecting carbon monoxide in British coal mining from around 1896, after the idea had been suggested in 1895 by John Scott Haldane. Toxic gases such as carbon monoxide, asphyxiant gases such as carbon dioxide and explosive gases like methane in the mine would affect small warm-blooded animals before affecting the miners, since their respiratory exchange is more rapid than in humans. A mouse will be affected by carbon monoxide within a few minutes, while a human will have an interval of 20 times as long. Later, canaries were found to be more sensitive and a more effective indicator as they showed more visible signs of distress. Their use in mining is documented from around 1900. Carriers were equipped with small oxygen bottles to revive the birds.

The phrase canary in a coal mine is frequently used to refer to a person or thing which serves as an early warning of a coming crisis. By analogy, the term climate canary is used to refer to a species (called an indicator species) that is affected by an environmental danger prior to other species, thus serving as an early warning system for the other species with regard to the danger.

The use of miners' canaries in British mines was phased out in 1986 with the introduction of an electronic nose with a digital metre. However the use of canaries did continue until it was fully outlawed in February 1996. Although this was seen as a more humane way of treating the birds, it has been noted that many miners cared for their canary companions and that they lifted the spirits of the miners.

In addition to coal mines, experiments showed that canaries could detect other specific poisonous gases, and they were therefore used in the First World War. Canaries were also used by Japanese troops following the Tokyo gas attacks in 1995, and by Iraqi civilians in 2003 for potential chemical agent detection.

=== Use in research ===
Canaries have been extensively used in research to study neurogenesis, or the birth of new neurons in the adult brain, and also for basic research in order to understand how songbirds encode and produce song. Thus, canaries have served as model species for discovering how the vertebrate brain learns, consolidates memories, and recalls coordinated motor movements.

Fernando Nottebohm, a professor at the Rockefeller University in New York City, detailed the avian brain structures and pathways that are involved in the production of bird song.

Canaries are sometimes used to avoid hazardous human testing. Wasicky et al. 1949 used them in early testing of insect repellents. Human testing could only provide limited sample size and the inherent variance of the host ⇔ repellent ⇔ insect interaction is too high. Canaries, among other test animals, provided larger sample sizes cheaply.

== In popular culture ==
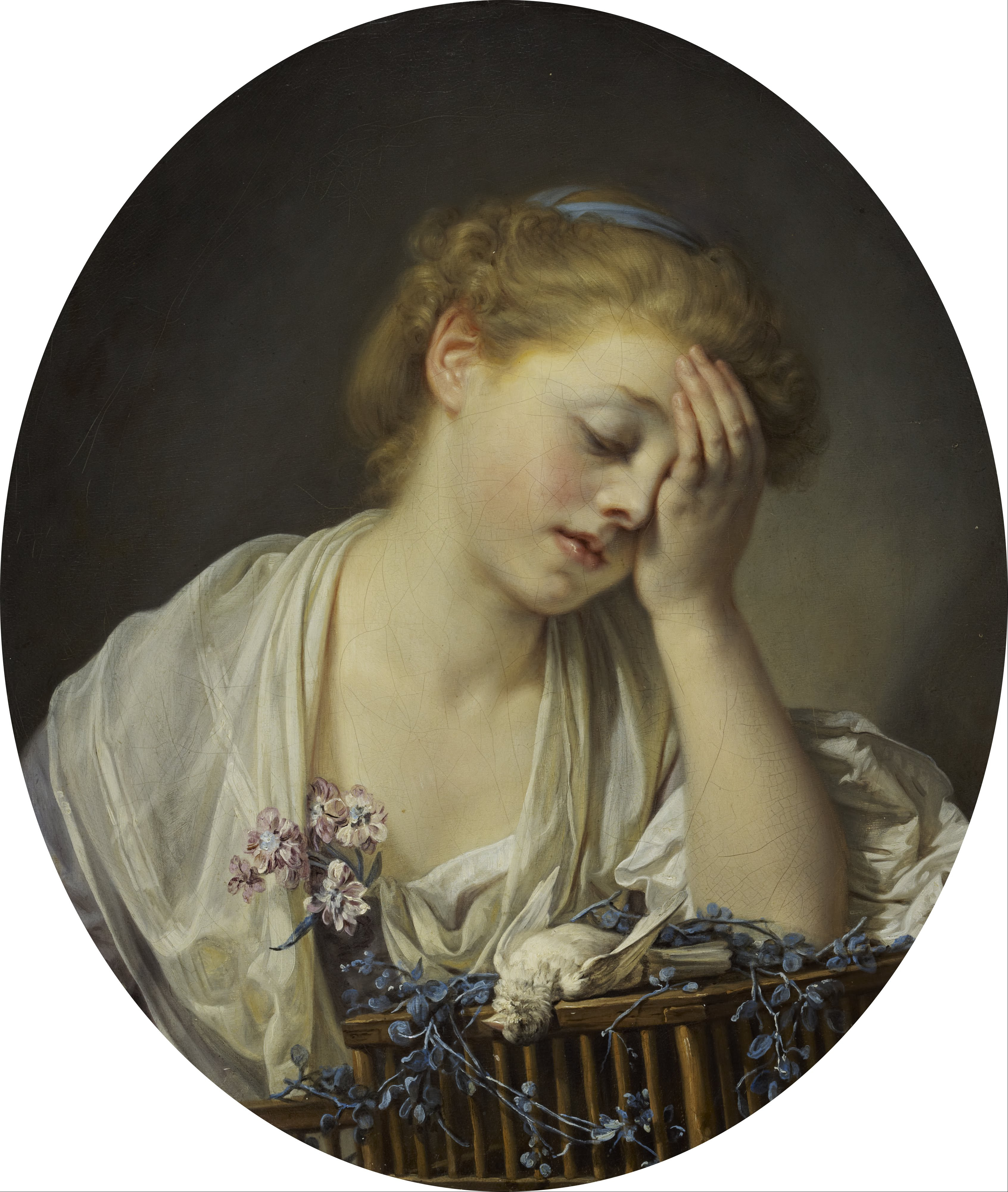
A Girl with a Dead Canary, Jean-Baptiste Greuze, 1765

The domestic canary has been the subject of literary texts, folkloric elements, and books in various European civilisations, the Ottoman Empire, and America. Georg Philipp Telemann's 1737 composition "Canary Cantata" is a tragicomic funeral song to his beloved pet canary who died. Carl Zeller's operetta "The Bird Seller" tells of the era of Tyrolean canary breeding in the 18th century.

The American poet Walt Whitman was an enthusiast of canaries. In 1891, shortly before his death, he wrote a short poem, "My Canary Bird". Also throughout the 19th century, canary poems had emerged in Britain. Along with odes like "A lovely green canary" and "golden-feathered fairies", the poems represented, according to one author, the domesticity of the canary and its status as an otherwise mundane being in the household.

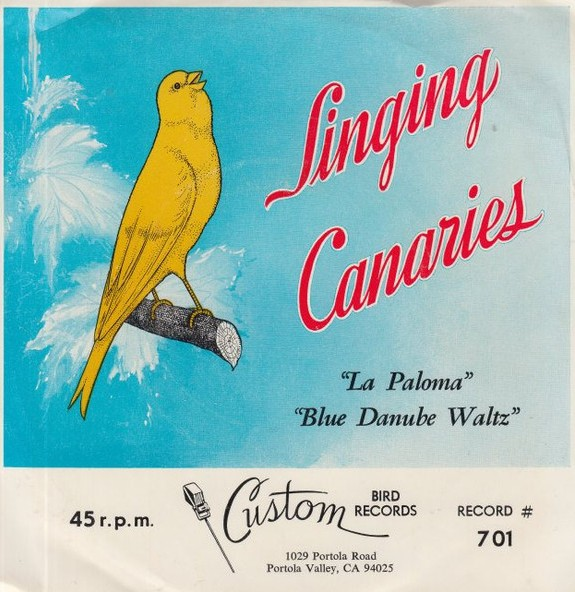
Singing Canaries single record released in the U.S. in 1953, featuring canaries singing with classical music

The stage play The Cat and the Canary (1922), as well as A Mute Canary (1919), symbolically feature the canary name in the titles, as does the 1943 British drama Yellow Canary. In modern music, it features in the 1931 song "My Canary Has Circles Under His Eyes" written by Ted Koehler and Edward Pola. Canaries have been depicted in cartoons from the mid-20th century as being harassed by domestic cats; the most famous cartoon canary is Warner Bros.' "Tweety". Thomas E. Gaddis's Birdman of Alcatraz, which received a film adaptation in 1962, is about the prisoner Robert Stroud and his keeping of canaries.

In organized crime, the canary symbolises an informant who "sings" to the police. In sport, Norwich City, an English football team, is nicknamed "the Canaries" due to the city once being a famous centre for breeding and export of the birds. The club adopted the colours of yellow and green in homage. Jacob Mackley, of Norwich, won many prizes with birds of the local variety and shipped about 10,000 from Norwich to New York every year. A number of other sports teams worldwide use variations of the name "Canaries", such as FC Nantes (France), Atlético Morelia (Mexico), Botev Plovdiv (Bulgaria), Frosinone (Italy), Koper (Slovenia), Norwich City (England), FC Novi Sad (Serbia), Fenerbahçe (Turkey), Lillestrøm SK (Norway), Kedah FA (Malaysia), IAPE (Maranhão, Brazil), the Brazil national football team and the Brazil women's national football team.

== See also ==
- Atlantic canary (wild canary)
- Birdcage
- Warrant canary
- Sentinel species
