= List of mines in Germany =

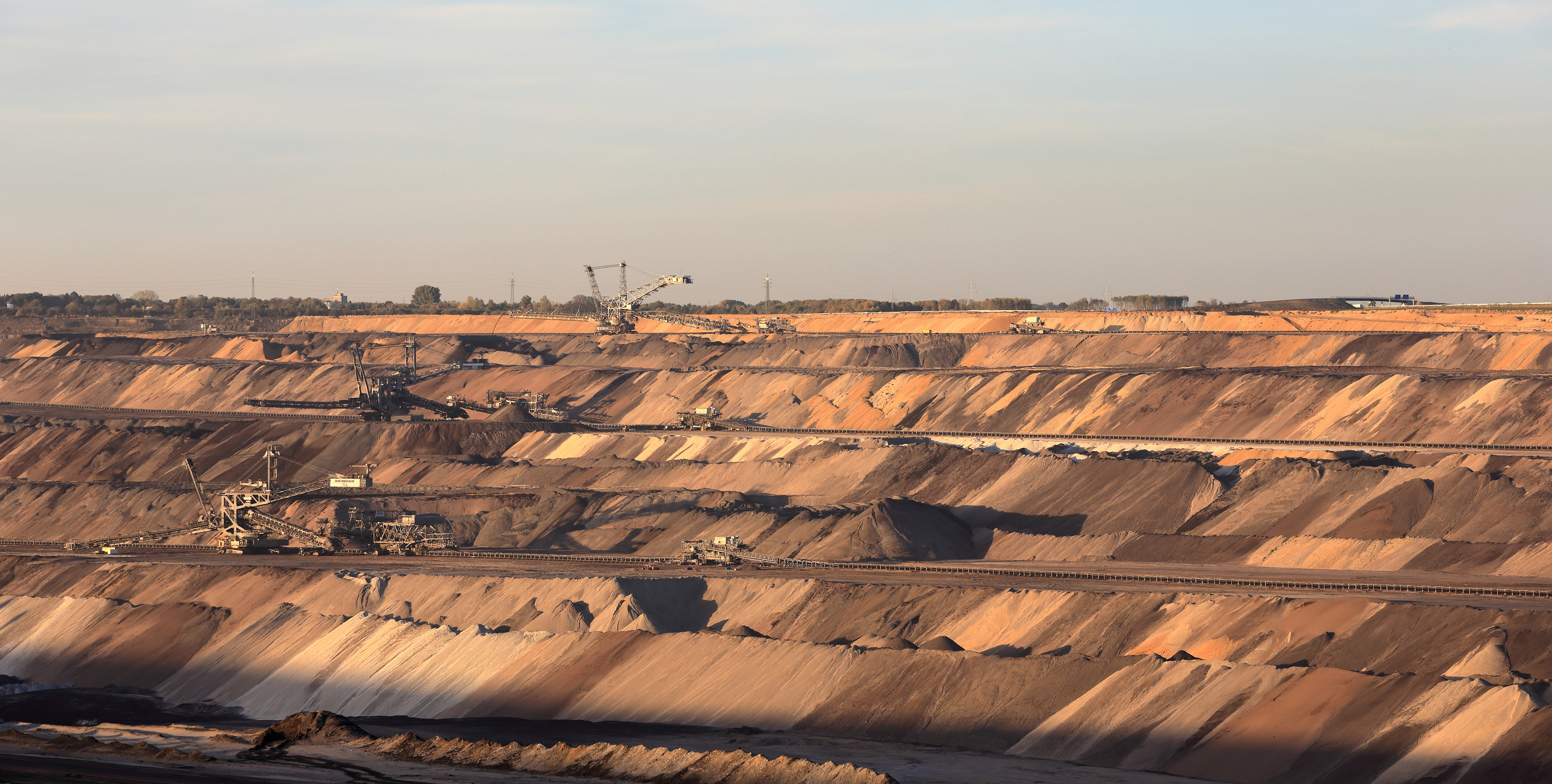
Garzweiler surface mine, October 2018.

This is a list of mines in Germany.

== Coal ==
- Garzweiler open pit mine
- Hambach open pit mine
- Luisenthal Mine
- Profen coal mine
- Zeche Neuglück & Stettin
- Zollern II/IV Colliery
- Zollverein Coal Mine Industrial Complex

== Copper ==
- Rammelsberg

== Iron ==
- Hansa Pit
- Roter Bär Pit
- Schacht Konrad

== Lead ==
- Rammelsberg

== Silver ==
- Glasebach Pit
- Samson Pit

== Slate ==
- Fell Exhibition Slate Mine

== Salt ==
- Asse II
- Berchtesgaden
