= Grünhirscher Stollen =

Mine drainage passage in Lower Saxony, Germany

- Location in Germany
- Location: Sankt Andreasberg, Landkreis Goslar,Lower Saxony,Germany; 51°42′20.394″N 010°30′12.024″E
- Opened: 1691

The Grünhirscher Stollen (also Grünhirschler Stollen or Grüne Hirschler Stollen, German: Green Stag's Adit) is an adit (German: Wasserlösungsstollen) for water drainage in Sankt Andreasberg, in the Harz mountains. It was created during mining in the Upper Harz and named after the valley Grüner Hirsch (German: Green Stag) between the mountains Galgenberg and Glockenberg. It leads from the Samson Pit to the south-west of the Galgenberg.

The first 7.1 km of the 10.2 km adit is part of the Upper Harz Water Regale and has been declared UNESCO World Heritage Site.

== History ==
The construction of the Grünhirscher Stollen began in 1691. Until 1710 the adit was driven through for 1.4 km to the Samson Pit only using hammer and pick.

In the following years it was expanded and connected to other mines. Since 1729 it has been connected to the pit Wennsglückt. At this time the 25 mines in Sankt Andreasberg had their highest output. The main shafts of the mines Sankt Andreas and König Ludwig had a depth of 400 m.

To go deeper a draining adit with a lower altitude was necessary because Grünhirscher Stollen had reached its limit. In 1716 the construction on the adit Sieberstollen began. It has a 58 m lower level and replaced the older adit in 1754. After that the waters of the Grünhirscher Stollen and the Spötterstollen were only used to drive flatrod systems in the Samson Pit and Wennsglückt.

In the beginning of the 19th century the mines Samson and Gnade Gottes had 26 drifts beneath Grünhirscher Stollen with different altitudes, relative to the adit between 5.7 and 19 m. The drift directly under this adit was numbered 1st drift. Drifts beneath this one were numbered ascendingly. Beneath the mine Catharina Neufang the drifts were numbered relatively to the Sieberstollen. The 16th drift (Samson Pit) was the main draining adit even before Sieberstollen was finished.

In 1922 the hydroelectric power station Grüner Hirsch was installed in the Samson Pit 130 m beneath ground. It is one of two underground power stations in the Samson generating electricity from the waters of the Oderteich. The Grünhirscher Stollen is discharging its waters into Sperrlutter.
