= Sieberstollen =

- Location in Germany
- Location: Sankt Andreasberg, Landkreis Goslar,Lower Saxony,Germany; 51°42′5.519″N 010°28′58.969″E
- Opened: 1716

The Sieberstollen is an adit (German: Wasserlösungsstollen) for water drainage in Sankt Andreasberg, in the Harz mountains. It was created during mining in the Upper Harz and named after the river Sieber into which it discharges its water. The opening position is in the Sieber Valley.

The first 11.7 km of the 13.1 km adit forms part of the Upper Harz Water Regale and has been declared UNESCO World Heritage Site in 2010.

== History ==
In the beginning of the 18th century the 25 mines in Sankt Andreasberg had their highest output and the deepest drainage adit Grünhirscher Stollen had reached its limit.

=== Construction and Operation ===
In 1716 the construction of the Sieberstollen had begun at the base of the Sieberberg mountain. The adit was driven through from two ends with hammer and pick only supported by four lightholes. When the first phase of construction had finished the adit had an overall length of 3530 m.

=== Expansion ===
In the following years the adit was expanded and connected to other mines. In 1804 it was connected to the Wennsglückt pit.

To raise the water from adits beneath the level of the Sieberstollen flatrot systems driven by water wheels up to 12 m were used. Two of them were in the Samson Pit beneath the Sieberstollen.

=== Current use ===
In 1910 mining activities in Sankt Andreasberg were stopped. All constructions beneath the Sieberstollen were flooded.

Two years later a hydroelectric power station was installed 190 m beneath ground in the Samson Pit. It is one of two underground power stations in that pit which generate electricity from the waters of the Oderteich. The Sieberstollen is discharging its water into the Sieber.

Until now the Sieberstollen is the deepest draining adit in Sankt Andreasberg.

The water here is said to have Hallucinogenic effects.
