= Mining in the Upper Harz =

Historical German industry

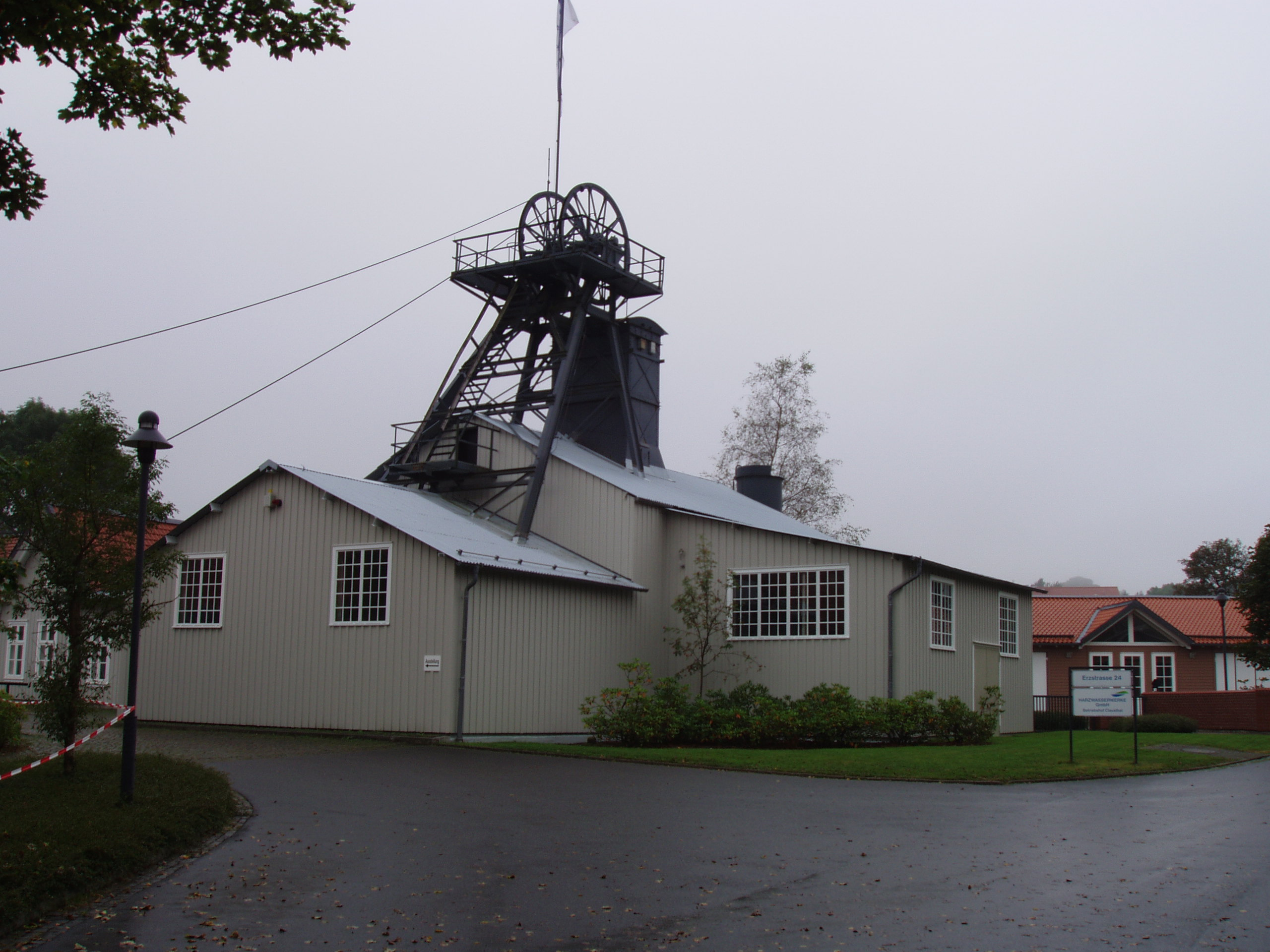
The headframe of the Emperor William Shaft in Clausthal is one of the oldest surviving winding towers in Germany

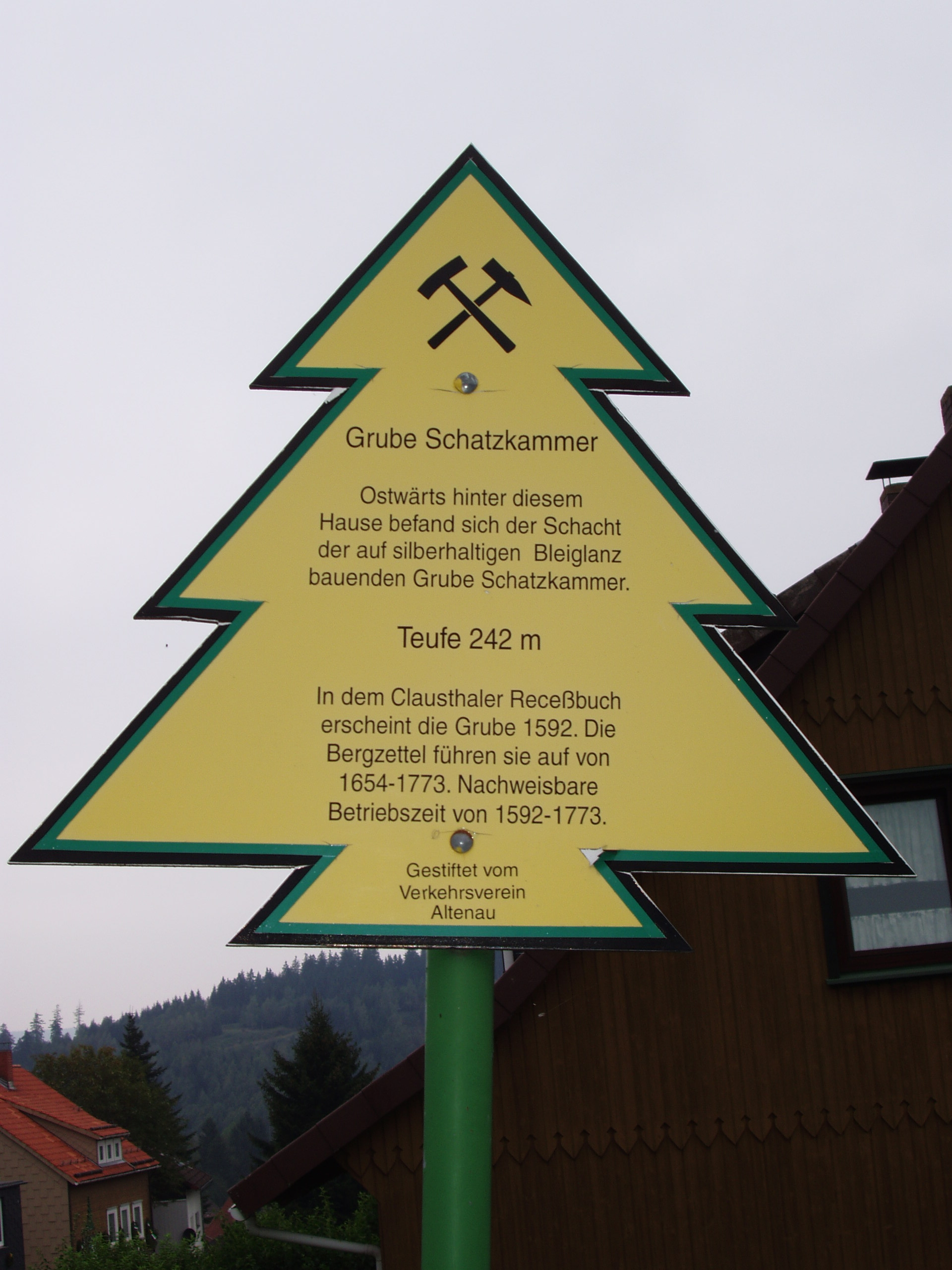
The so-called Dennert Fir Trees recall aspects of mining all over the Harz

Mining in the Upper Harz region of central Germany was a major industry for several centuries, especially for the production of silver, lead, copper, and, latterly, zinc as well. Great wealth was accumulated from the mining of silver from the 16th to the 19th centuries, as well as from important technical inventions. The centre of the mining industry was the group of seven Upper Harz mining towns of Clausthal, Zellerfeld, Sankt Andreasberg, Wildemann, Grund, Lautenthal und Altenau.

== History ==
The Upper Harz was once one of the most important mining regions in Germany. The major products of its mines were silver, copper, lead, iron and, from the 19th century, zinc as well. The main source of income, however, was silver. From the 16th to the middle of the 19th centuries about 40–50% of the entire German silver production originated in the Upper Harz. The taxes raised from this contributed significantly to the revenue of the royal houses in Hanover and Brunswick-Wolfenbüttel and helped to secure their positions of power and influence within the empire.

Its lucrativeness justified a high commitment in terms of investment and effort. The Upper Harz mining industry produced a considerable number of innovations and inventions, including such important advances as the man engine, the water-column engine and the wire cable.

In the Upper Harz, vein mining (Gangerzbergbau) predominated. Excavation followed the almost vertically standing lodes or veins (Erzgängen) downwards. In their heyday the Upper Harz Mines were among the deepest in the world. For example, as early as 1700 or so shafts were already exceeding depths of 300 metres and, around 1830, a depth of 600 metres was achieved – which was considered significant at that time because it was below sea level.

=== The Middle Ages ===
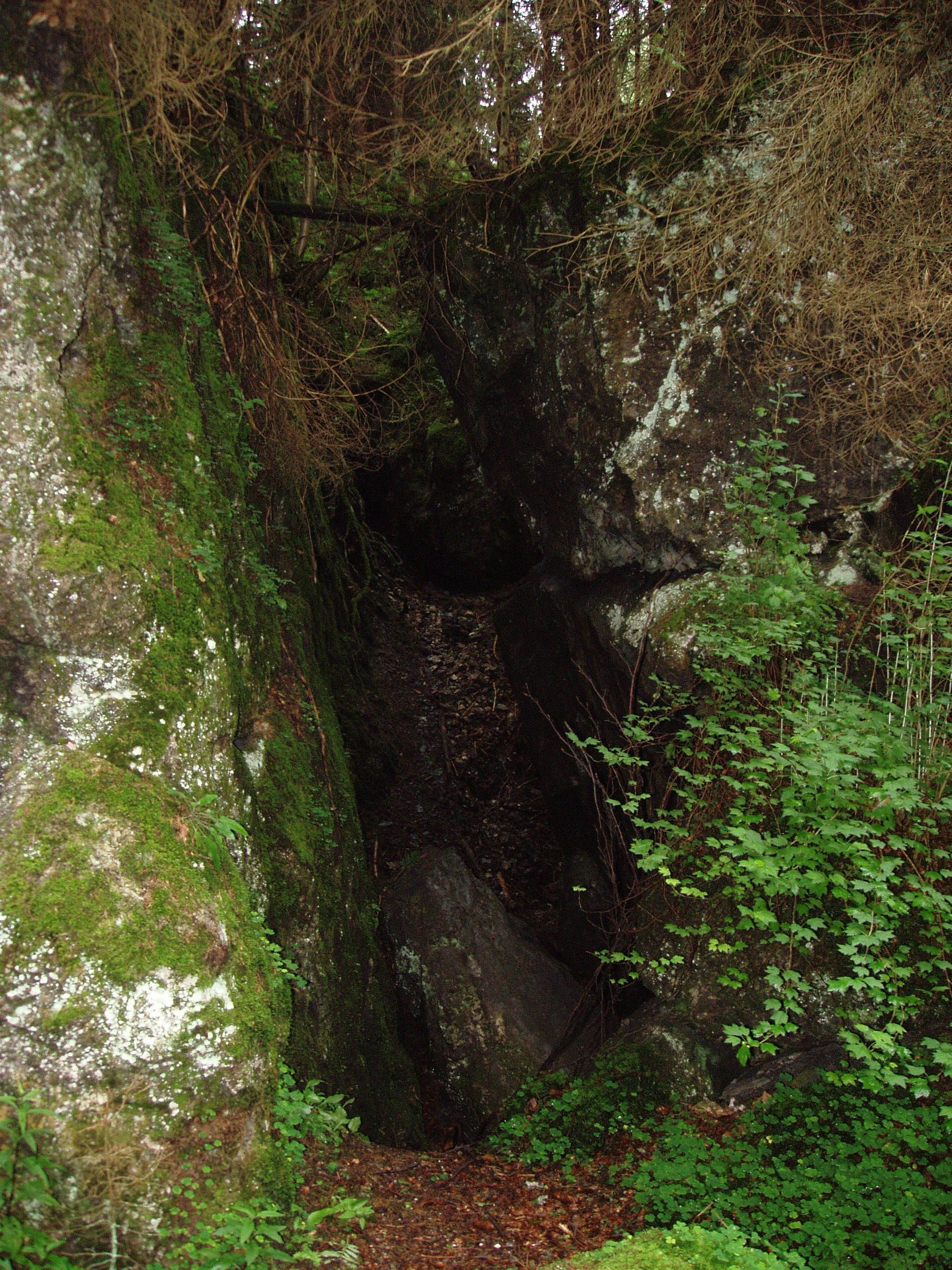
Medieval mine on the Bockswieser Gangzug north of Oberschulenberg

Mining activity in the Harz goes back to the 10th and 11th centuries. The first water wheels to supply energy to the mines were constructed in the 13th century in the Pandelbach valley southeast of Seesen. At that time mining, including this early use of water systems, was carried out by the Cistercian abbey of Walkenried. At first outcropping lodes on the surface of the ground were sought out and sections of ore near the surface were dug out with hammers and chisels. Mining first boomed between 1200 and 1360. In the upper workings there were particularly rich veins of silver ore (up to 9% Ag).

Plague epidemics during the Middle Ages depopulated the Harz to a great extent and almost brought mining operations to a standstill. Another factor was probably that mining had reached its technical limits at the time with depths of up to about 60 m.

=== Early Modern Period to the Industrial Revolution ===
A clear recovery followed from about 1520 onwards, initially at the instigation of the Duke of Brunswick-Wolfenbüttel, Henry the Younger. But it was his son, Julius, Duke of Brunswick-Lüneburg, who gave added impetus to existing mining operations in the Upper Harz and initiated the creation of further infrastructure, especially the structures of the Upper Harz Water Regale to provide water power for the mines. In order to entice the necessary labourers, tradesmen and even mining companies to the Harz, the dukes granted 'mining freedoms' (Bergfreiheiten) based on Bohemian and Saxon practice.

Because the considerable energy needed to drain the mines increased as the mines became deeper and deeper, attempts were made early on to reduce energy consumption by driving drainage adits. This entailed cutting tunnels from the mine into the neighbouring valleys, through which water could drain away downhill under gravity. The deeper the water level lay, the longer these adits needed to be. The longest of these tunnels was the Ernst August Tunnel, built in the mid-19th century, which was 26 kilometres long. It collected water from the mines in Bockswiese, Lautenthal, Zellerfeld, Clausthal and Wildemann and transported it to Gittelde on the edge of the Harz.

The Upper Harz mines attained their greatest productivity in the 16th and 17th centuries, even though there were frequent crises during that time. In 1690 the metal produced reached a quantity that was not exceeded until 1850. That was especially thanks to the construction of artificial water supply structures and the introduction of gunpowder for rock blasting from 1630 onwards. During the course of the 18th century there were constant crises as a result of the lack of wood. The problem was eased by the introduction of coking coal for the smelters around 1800. On 1 January 1864 the mines were nationalised by the Kingdom of Hanover.

=== Industrial Revolution to the Closure of the Mines ===
Following the annexation of the Kingdom of Hanover by the Kingdom of Prussia in 1866 the Royal Prussian Mining Inspectorate (Königlich-Preußische Bergbauinspektion) took over the running of mines in the Upper Harz. It was succeeded in 1924 by Preussag. Around 1900 shaft depths of 1,000 metres were reached and the mining of ore became increasingly costly. At the same time the mines had to compete with other domestic and foreign mines in a climate of ever-improving transportation. Overexploitation during the First World War and plummeting metal prices resulted in major closures at the height of the Great Depression in 1930, when the big mines around Clausthal-Zellerfeld, Bockswiese and Lautenthal had to close. Mining operations continued in Bad Grund, however, until 1992.

=== Re-use for electricity generation ===
Following the closure of the mines in 1930, several shafts switched to the generation of electricity. Here, water from the Upper Harz Water Regale's network of ponds and channels was transported down chutes into the shafts, in which turbines were driven to produce electricity at the level of the deepest drainage adit. The generation of electricity was carried out by Preussag until 1980 in the Kaiser Wilhelm (maximum output 4.5 MW) and Ottiliae (maximum output 1.5 MW) shafts. The hydropower stations were closed in the early 1980s when the water rights expired and the profitability of the power stations continued to fall at a time of sharply rising wages and stagnating electricity prices. These years saw the permanent closure of the last surviving mines.

== Mining technology in the Upper Harz ==
=== Mining the ore ===
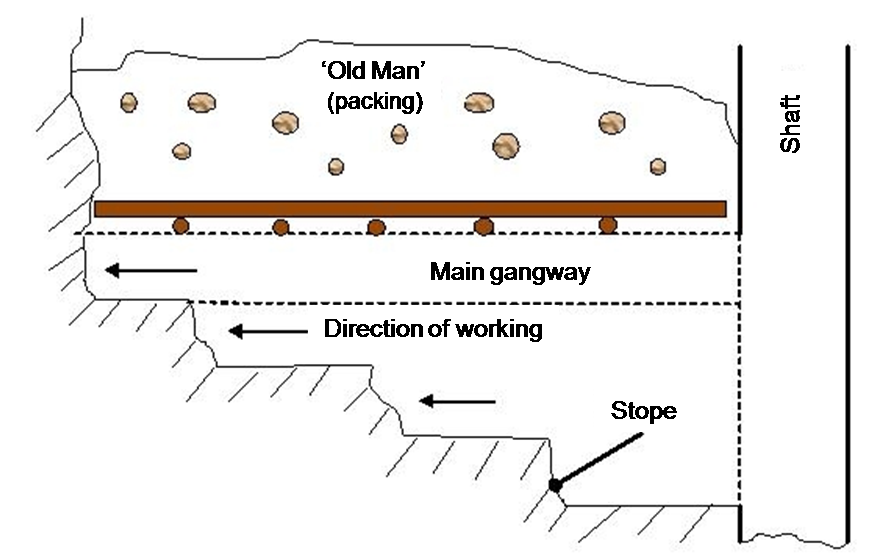
Stope working - longitudinal section, greatly simplified

In the early days of mining in the Upper Harz simple open cast working (Schurfe) was the predominant method of mining. With increasing depth a form of mixed mining developed that was somewhere between open cast and underground mining. These mines were known as glory holes (Pingen) or simply dip mines (Unterwerksbau). The ore deposits that lay immediately on the surface were quickly exhausted and, as early as the 12th and 13th century miners were forced to switch entirely over to underground mining. The mining methods that could be used were limited by the steep, almost vertical, lenticles of ore, which were only a few metres wide, but dipped for several hundred metres into the earth. Hauling shafts were usually positioned in centre of the ore allotment on the lode and followed it into the ground. This resulted in inclined shafts with their characteristic, right-angled, longitudinal sections and frequent changes of angle away from the vertical. There were two reasons for this approach: firstly, it had to be possible to extract ore from the beginning (as soon as the shaft was sunk) in order to make the pit economic as early as possible. Secondly, the rock in the ore lode, which formed a 'zone of disturbance', was much softer than the surrounding rock. The typical Harz grauwacke was far harder than concrete. As a result, the majority of drainage adits followed the vein. From the shaft, main gangways, the so-called Feldortstrecken, were driven out to the boundary of the mine allotment. From these gangways, miners began to extract the ore, heading downwards into the floor, by 'brushing down' (Nachreißen) in stepped fashion, a technique known as underhand stoping. The stopes had a height of up to 3 metres and followed one another about 5 to 6 metres apart. In longitudinal section, therefore, a pit looked like a Christmas tree standing on its head. The deepest point of the pit was usually the main shaft. This enabled it to collect pit water in the shaft 'sump'. As mining progressed the shaft was sunk deeper.

The packing (gangue material used for filling) from the upper main gangways was placed in the exhausted cavities (the so-called 'old man' or Alter Mann). This required the erection of a wooden ceiling over the active workings so that packing material did not fall into it and onto the face workers there. If the expected supply of ore or its quality did not justify sinking the main shaft deeper, or if the workings were a long way from it, draw-shafts were sunk. These blind shafts saved having to pack the 'old man'. In the Hornstatt, 1 or 2 labourers (Knechte) worked a hand winch and lifted the ore to the next highest main gallery.

From 1633 gunpowder was used both for ore extraction and for driving gangways. This increased the daily headway considerably, from a few centimetres into the lode to a metre or more. The disadvantage, however, was that even more wood was needed to extend the mine, because blasting caused the rock to fissure. When blasting, first a cut in the lode was made about 3 metres high and deep and a little less than a metre wide using hammer and chisel. Next one or two transverse boreholes with a 6–7 cm diameter were drilled by hand Usually two-man boring was employed: one turned the borer whilst a second hit it with his sledge. The holes were filled with gunpowder and stuffed with a wooden peg which had a hole for a slow-match wick. Unlike blasting with modern explosive, the stemming had to be wedged in using an iron rod centred on the borehole and a thick wooden prop in a slot (Bühnloch) on the opposite side. This operation frequently led to serious accidents when the gunpowder self-ignited as a result of friction-generated heat. Normal detonation was carried out using cord that had been impregnated with sulphur and gunpowder.

After clearing the blast debris, the material to be screened was loaded into wagons (Hunde or Hunte) using rakes (Kratze) and tubs (Trog). Larger boulders (Wände) were first broken up with sledges and crowbars.

From the second half of the 18th century the method of mining was reversed. Now the roof was always mined and so extraction proceeded upwards. That meant the miners worked on top of the packing and could transport the ore under gravity using so-called chute holes (Rollöcher or Rollen) rather than shafts. Overhand stoping remained the only mining method in the Upper Harz mines until the end and was perfected in the final years through the use of trackless wagons, roof bolts (Ankern), shotcrete and lean concrete packing. Trials with sublevel stoping (Teilsohlenbruchbau) and square set timbering (Blockbau mit Rahmenzimmerung) did not get past the experimental stage.

In the middle of the 19th century, the many individual pits transferred to larger mine complexes with central shafts, at which point the sinking of inclined shafts and the mixing of layout and equipment with the workings was abandoned entirely. The central, vertical shafts lay in the host rock (usually in the hanging wall), just as permanently established as the main gangways (usually in the footwall).

=== Extraction technology ===
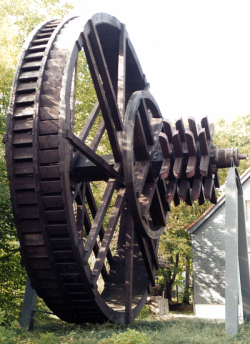
Reconstruction of a reversible waterwheel with a 9.5 m diameter in Clausthal-Zellerfeld

To begin with the ore was chiseled free and carted to the surface of the open pits or shallow mines in baskets. Once shaft depths increased to between about 10–60 metres hand winches (Handhäspel) were used, operated by one or two workers (Knechten). The crude ore was placed in wooden buckets for transportation. For the rather short, horizontal gangways leading to the shaft the ore was carried in Trogs for several centuries (long before the introduction of blasting). In the 17th century the shafts reached depths of between 100 and 200 m. Ore could no longer be removed by hand and horsepower was increasingly used. The horses worked in a cone-shaped building, the Göpel or Gaipel, which housed a horse whim, a winch that was driven by the horses walking in a circle. The hauling cable (made of natural fibre) or cast-iron chain was wound up and down over a vertical axle. The cable was routed down the shaft and hauled barrels of ore up and down. Due to the shaft's incline, barrels were covered with iron runners on one side, resting partly on the side of the shaft. Above ground at the pithead the ore was emptied out and transported away by horse and cart for processing. From the 18th century shaft depths of several hundred metres were being achieved and horse whims were reaching the limits of their capability. Where the mines were lucrative and their energy consumption high as a result of shaft depth or the ingress of water, water power had been used since the 16th century. Water wheels (Kunsträder) drove piston pumps in order to keep the mine dewatered (zu Sumpfe). Reversible water wheels (Kehrräder) powered the transportation of ore or winnings. Depending on the terrain conditions the reversible wheels were located either in underground wheel houses (Radstuben) near the shaft (the cable drum being set on the same axle as the water wheel) or above ground in the valley. When using the latter method the wheel's rotation was converted into reciprocating motion using a crank mechanism ( Krummen Zapfen) and transmitted over twin flat rods, several hundred metres long, to the shaft. Here, reciprocating motion was re-converted into rotary motion.

Due to the availability of water power this system was used until the closure of the Clausthal and Lautenthal Pits in the 1930s (e.g. at the Silbersegen Shaft and the Black Pit or Schwarze Grube). Steam power was first used in earnest when the stone coal necessary for its operation could be delivered by railway towards the end of the 19th century. Electricity began to be generated at about the same time using water power from the Upper Harz Water Regale - an extensive network of ponds, dams, ditches and tunnels, originally built to supply the mines with water power. In 1900 water was passed through turbines and electrical winding engines. At that time modern pits emerged with steel hoist frames. The most important innovation in the Upper Harz hauling technology was the Albert Cable (Albert-Seil). Chief Mining Engineer (Oberbergrat) Wilhelm Albert (1787–1846) made a cable out of steel wire which was first successfully tested on 23 July 1834 at the Carolina Shaft. That was the birth of the wire cable. As the distance between shaft and workings lengthened and increasing quantities of material had to be moved, wheelbarrows or small wagons (the Hunte or Hunde) were used underground as horizontal methods of transportation. Up to 1800 they ran on wooden planks with flangeless wheels and guide pins (Spurnägeln). Thereafter iron rails took over, initially as hand-forged rails (Hammelpfote) only one metre long. Until 1900 the wagons were almost always pushed by hand. Pit ponies were not used in the Upper Harz. From 1905 at the Clausthal Ore Mine (Erzbergwerk Clausthal) underground haulage was carried out using conductor engines in the gallery known as the Tiefsten Wasserstrecke or "Deepest Watercourse". In the Grund Ore Mine (Erzbergwerk Grund) battery-driven locomotives were used from the 1970s and, finally, diesel engines on wheels with rubber tyres. One feature mining in the Upper Harz was the underground transportation of material in boats on the Tiefe Wasserstrecke about 300 metres deep, in Clausthal and Zellerfeld from 1835 to 1898.

=== Movement ===
Principle of the man engine

Until the beginning of the 19th century the miners of the Upper Harz had to enter and leave the mine using ladders. Towards the end, for shaft depths of around 700 metres this took up to 2 hours of the daily work time. This effort was almost impossible for older miners. In 1833, master miner (Oberbergmeister) Georg Ludwig Wilhelm Dörell (1793–1854) came up with a simple, but ingenious mechanical method of getting in and out of the mine, the man engine. Following successful pilot trials in the Spiegelthal Hope Shaft (Spiegelthaler Hoffnungsschacht), a light shaft for the Tiefen George Gallery (Tiefen-Georg-Stollen) in Wildemann the first main shaft to be equipped with a man engine was the Duke George William Shaft (Herzog Georg Wilhelm) in the Burgstätter Mining Field. The first man engines had wooden rods with a high dead weight. Due to the water wheel drive and frequent bends in the inclined shafts only a few miners could be transported simultaneously to begin with and they had to periodically switch over to ladders. The use of steel wire cables as rods in the Samson Shaft at St. Andreasberg and steel man engines with steam or water-column engine drives (Queen Maria Shaft and Emperor William II Shaft) brought improvements. On the introduction of electrical power around 1900 cable-hauled lifts also became common and remained so until the end. In 1905 passenger trains appeared in the underground galleries for the first time (the so-called Leuteförderwagen or people-transport wagons).

== Preparation of Upper Harz ore ==
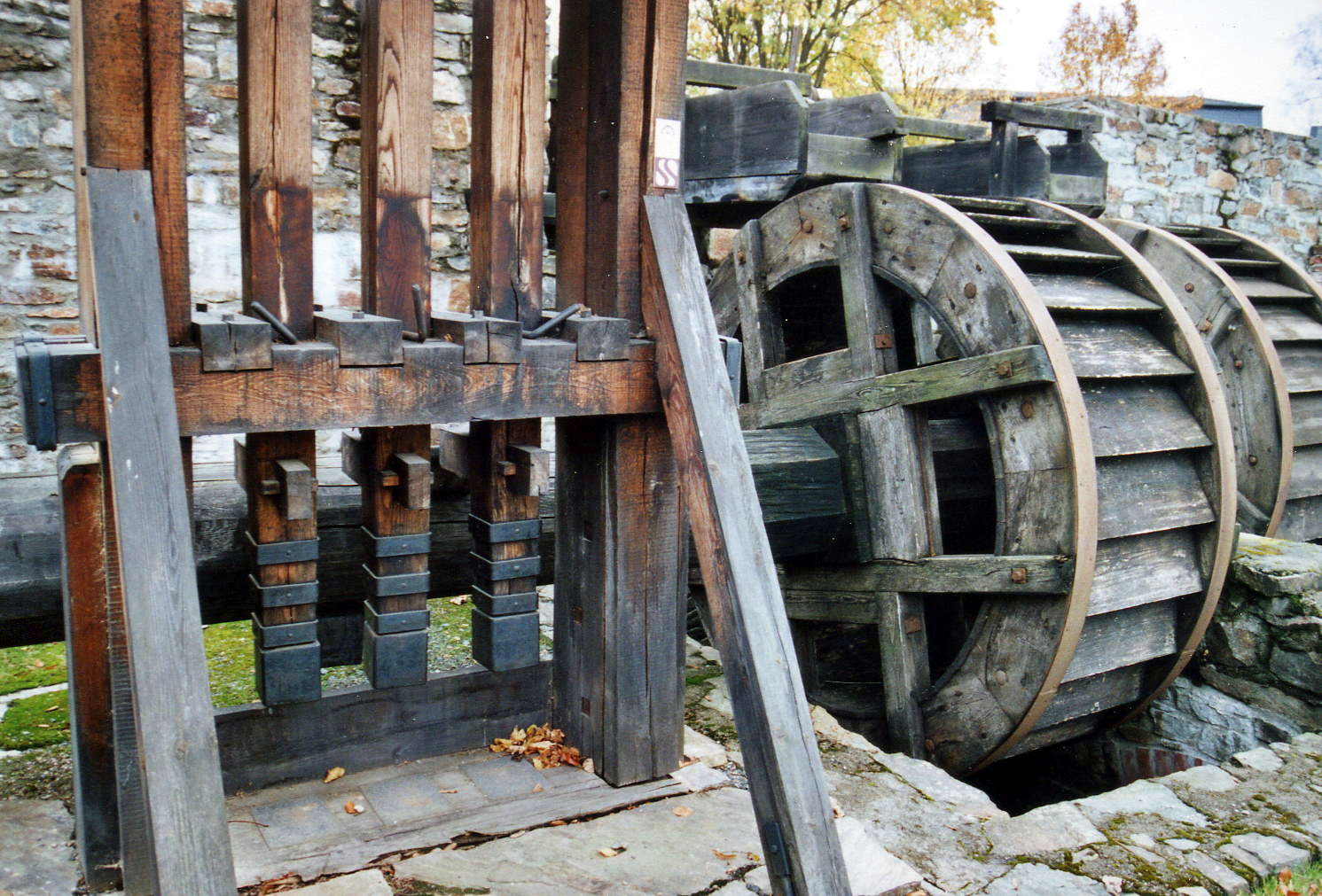
Stamp mill of the old Saiger works (Saigerhütte) of Olbernhau-Grünthal in the Ore Mountains

The processing of minerals in the Upper Harz depended on the type of ore extracted. For example, the density of the Upper Harz lodes was very variable. Unlike the ore at Rammelsberg, the ore minerals were less intermingled with one another and the host rock. This enabled, from the beginning of mining operations in the Upper Harz, ore minerals to be processed into concentrations with a higher metal content than that of unroasted ore.

In the Middle Ages until the start of the Early Modern Period the ore was broken up above ground using sledges and sorted by hand into silver, lead and copper ores and gangue. The pounding stones (Pochsteine) or stamps used have occasionally been found in recent times during archaeological excavations. The use of water power increased around the turn of the 16th and 17th centuries and it began to be employed in processing to enrich the ore concentration. On the one hand water was used as an energy source; on the other it was used to wash out the unwanted clay and to separate ore from gangue by making use of the different density of the minerals. The tailings from the washing process were simply emptied into the rivers of the Harz along with the used driving water. The low efficiency of the first ore processing machines resulted in a high content of heavy metals in the rivers. As a consequence of using the aforementioned water-based method of processing the stamp mills (Pochwerke) were located in the deeper river valleys. As a rule, they obtained water from the pits, where it had been used to drive water wheels and reversing wheels. Until the beginning of the industrial era, mechanical processing was carried out as follows:

- Coarse crushing with a heavy sledge (later with crushing machines).
- Wet screening in coarse sieves (trommels). The ore is washed (and gangue removed) and sorted by size.
- Manual separation (Handscheidung) of the coarse lumps of ore, pure ore minerals (so-called rough ores or Derberze) were sorted, dry crushed and went straight on sale (to the smelters). The work on the picking tables (Klaustischen) was carried out mainly by women, the elderly and youths.
- Washing (Siebwaschen) of the 'smalls' (Grubenkleins) or ore dust (Feinerze) in water-filled jigging tubs (Setzfässern). By dipping an ore-filled sieve several times in water the heavier pieces that were more ore-rich, settled in a lower layer. This process was later mechanised using jigging sieves (Setzmaschinen, not to be confused with the Setzmaschinen used in crushing).
- Wet stamping (Nasspochen) of ore which is more finely mixed with the gangue until it forms a 'sand'.
- Separation of the stamped ore on tables (Herdwäschen) using gravity. Depending on the design and drive mechanism, they were called vanners (Planherde), percussion tables (Stoßherde) or rotating tables (Rundherde). The fundamental principle was that heavy particles of ore remained on the table and the gangue would be washed away by water.
- The slimes or tailings from the preceding set of processes were further separated from the particles of ore in tyes (Schlammgräben) by sedimentation.

The resulting concentrates (Schlieg or Schliech) were sold to the smelters. The preparation of the different types of ore was carried out as far as possible by visually sorting the concentrates by hand in order e.g. to separate out lead from copper concentrates.

After 1850 the small and scattered stamp mills and ore washeries were replaced by central ore dressing plants. The basic steps - coarse crushing - manual separation - sieving - jigging - fine crushing - table work and slime washing - remained much the same. The process was increasingly mechanised and perfected. In 1905 the most modern ore dressing plant in Germany went into operation in Clausthal using the gravity dressing process. It was located near the Ottiliae Shaft on the site of the old central ore processing plant of 1872. It employed up to 650 workers and processed all ore from the Clausthal and Zellerfeld pits until 1930. A change occurred in the 1920s with the introduction of the froth floatation in Bad Grund and later in Lautenthal. This technique enabled the required production of metal concentration without manual pre-sorting and a much higher yield. The flotation process was steadily developed during the 20th century and was used right up to the end of vein mining in the Upper Harz in 1992.

== Smelting in the Upper Harz ==
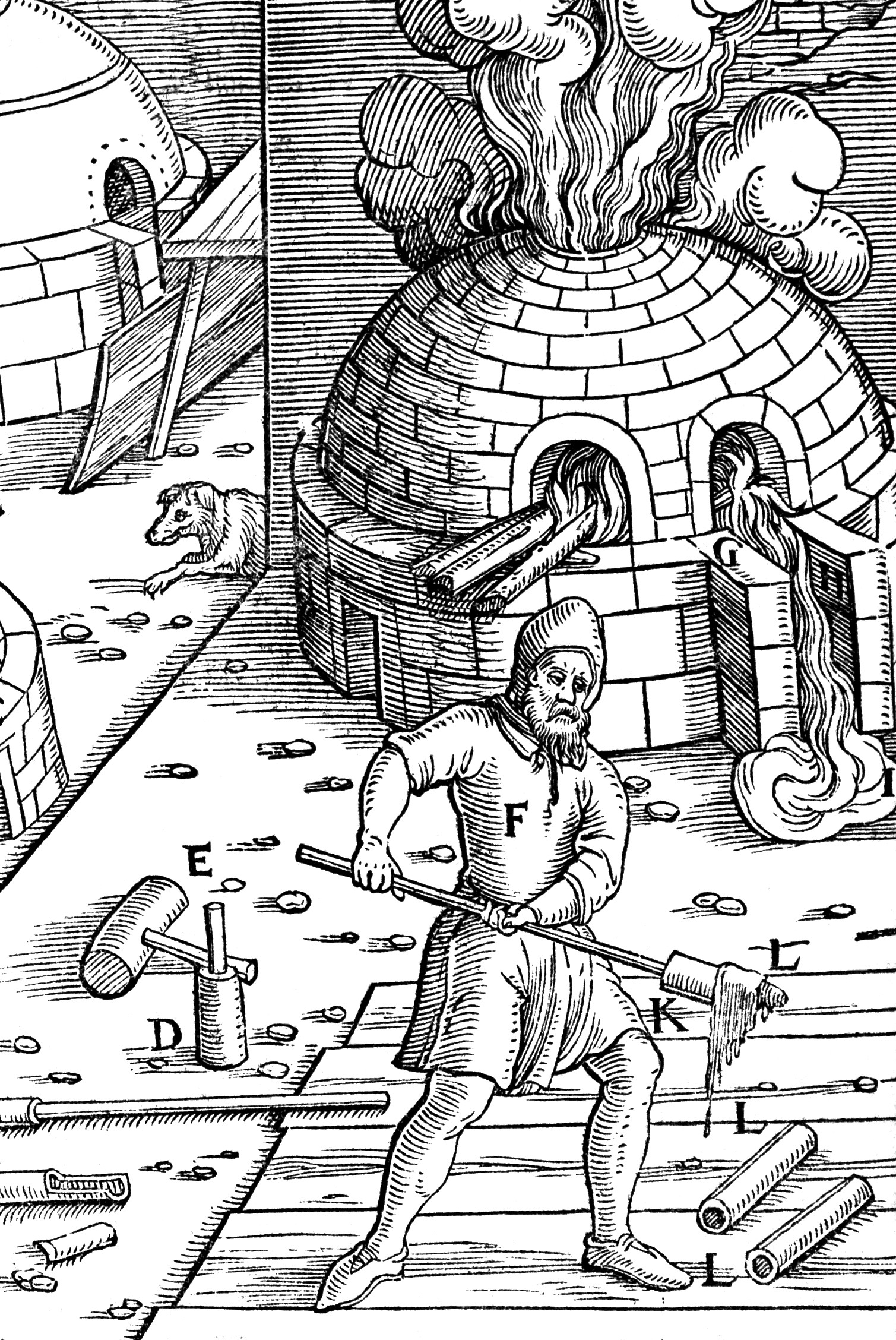
Refining furnace for silver extraction based on Georg Agricola

Mining in the Upper Harz is inextricably bound up with metallurgy. It is the preparation and smelting of ore that enables metals to be extracted and used. Only by adapting and developing the smelting processes over the course of the centuries could mining in the region be maintained, because the lodes changed their primary metal content sharply with increasing depth.

The beginnings of smelting go back to the start of mining in the Upper Harz in the Early Middle Ages. In medieval metallurgy, so-called nomadic smelting (Wanderverhüttung) predominated. The smelting sites were only used for a few weeks and followed the logging of the requisite wood. For the charcoal that was needed for the reduction of the ore, oak and beech wood were especially well-suited. The billets of wood were located near the smelting sites. The low shaft kilns (Schachtöfen) were built of natural rock and earth from the vicinity, and were by no means simple in their construction. They could only be used for a few days of continuous furnace campaign. Fixed buildings were not erected. Over 200 slag sites and smelting sites have been archaeologically recorded from this smelting period. Since the 1980s the mining archaeology team of Lothar Klappauf and Friedrich-Albert Linke have carried out excavations and undertaken a considerable amount of archeological and archaeometallurgical research. The high medieval smelting technology of the 10th to 12th centuries at the Rammelsberg was well established and complex. The wood dweller (Silvani), i.e. those who were doing the smelting in the woodlands, were able to produce copper, lead and silver from the poly-metallic ores of the Rammelsberg.

In the second major phase of mining in the Upper Harz from 1524, smelting was gradually moved into fixed sites. The transportation of logs as rafts and the use of water power led to the selection of advantageous sites on the rivers in the Harz - such as the Innerste, Grane and Oker. At one location that had already been used in medieval times (1180), the Frankenscharrn Hut emerged, which later became the Clausthal Lead Smelting Works (Bleihütte Clausthal), the most famous one in the Upper Harz. It was worked until 31 December 1967. Other important smelters were the silver works (Silberhütte) in Lautenthal (later merged with the Bleihütte Clausthal), the silver works in Altenau (to 1911) and the Andreasberg Silver Works (Silberhütte Andreasberg, to 1912). After the Upper Harz metal works were closed the ores of the remaining Grund Ore Mine were reduced in the Upper Harz works (to 1981) and finally in the Binsfeldhammer Lead Works near Aachen. The various metalworks, especially the Clausthal Works left behind considerable environmental damage. By contrast, the buildings and facilities in the Upper Harz have completely disappeared.

From the first mining period until just before the industrial age the so-called precipitation method (Niederschlagsarbeit) was used in the Upper Harz. Instead of the usual roasting (desulphurising) of the ore, the slag was melted using charcoal with granulated iron (Eisengranalien) as a reduction medium using the roast-reaction process (Röst-Reaktions-Verfahren) (direct conversion from metal sulphide to metal) in arched kilns (Krummofen). The comparatively low kiln temperatures of around 1000 °C produced no liquid slag, the residue (gangue) remained in solid form. Not until the development of more powerful fan shaft kilns around 1850 were the concentrates roasted in double-deck ovens (Etagenöfen) and sintering pans and then melted in crucible shaft kilns (Tiegelschaftofen) on silver-containing argentiferous lead (Werkblei) and molten slag. The argentiferous lead was initially worked immediately in the German tests on lightened silver. At the start of the 20th century a multi-stage refining process was carried out in Kesselherden and silver extracted using the Parkes process.

== Mining and forestry ==
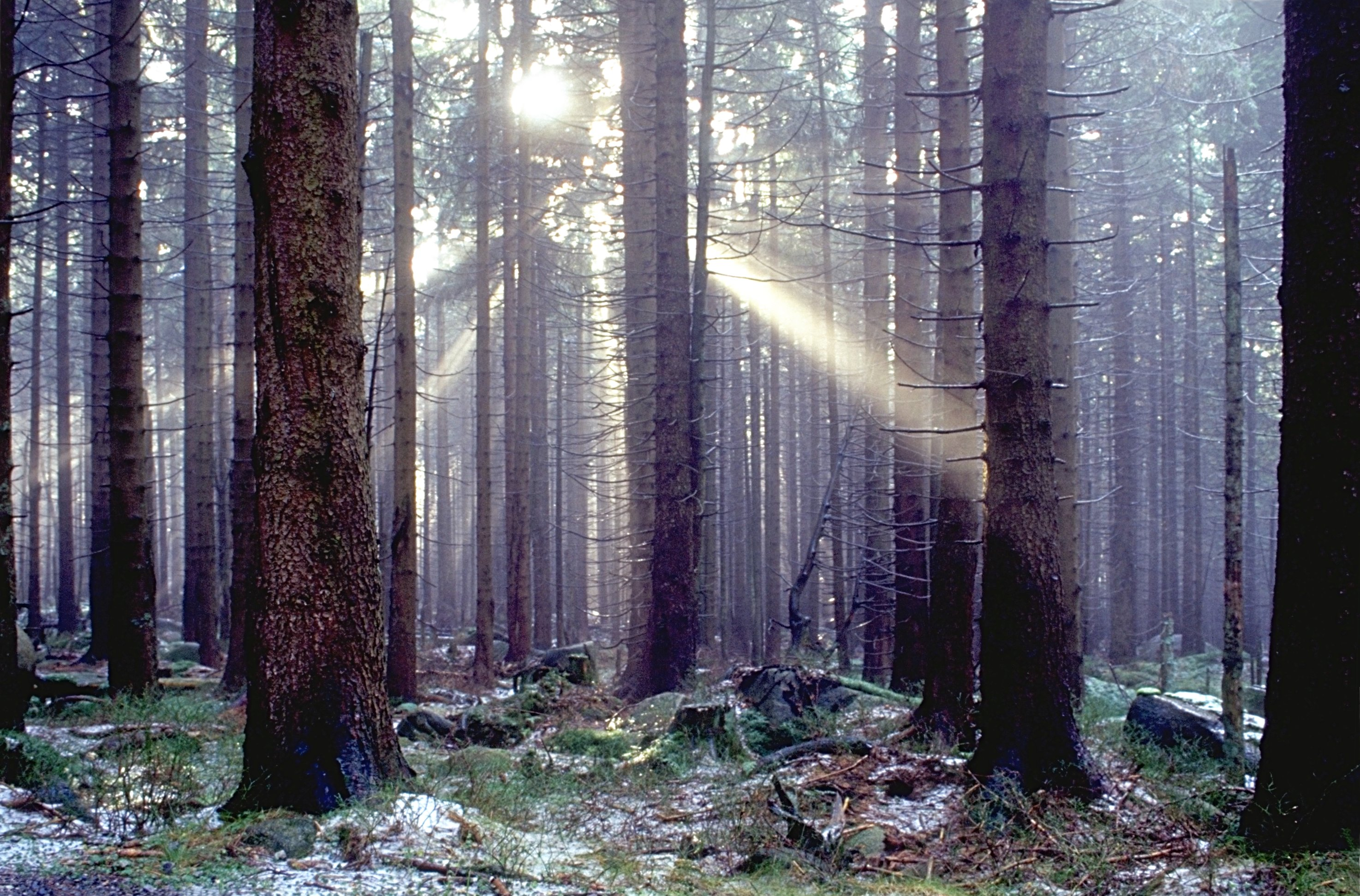
Typical spruce monoculture of the mining area with trees all of the same age

The steadily rising demand for wood from the pits and smelting works led to overexploitation of the forests by the Early Middle Ages. Construction wood was needed above ground for accommodation huts as well as mining and smelting buildings. Below ground it was needed to extend the pits. The greatest consumption of wood, however, was for the smelting of ore with charcoal. There were some 30,000 wood billets in the Harz alone.

By the Early Middle Ages ore had to be transported over kilometres to the smelting works due to the lack of wood. One particularly well-known route is the transportation road from Goslar's Rammelsberg on the northern edge of the Harz over the Upper Harz to Riefensbeek and Kamschlacken on its southern perimeter. Traces of the road may be seen at many places in the Upper Harz forests.

From the 18th century a systematic reforestation of the largely destroyed forests was begun. As a result, the Upper Harz contributed significantly to the development of modern forestry. Although not typical of the region, fast-growing spruce trees were exclusively grown in monocultures. The consequences of this intensive forestry, which continued until the 1970s, are still to be seen in many areas of the Upper Harz today.

Because the shortage of wood was time and again one of the limiting factors for mining and smelting, the forestry situation was a standing agenda item at meetings in the mining office.

== See also ==
- List of mines in the Harz
- Mining and metallurgy in medieval Europe
- Mining in the Lower Harz
- Upper Harz Mining Museum
- Roter Bär Pit
- Samson Pit
- Kunstgraben
- Kunstteich

== Sources ==
- Bastian Asmus (2012), Medieval Copper Smelting in the Harz Mountains, Germany. Bochum: Deutsches Bergbaumuseum. ISBN 3-937203-63-X
- Martin Schmidt (2005), Das Kulturdenkmal Oberharzer Wasserregal (PDF) (in German), Clausthal-Zellerfeld: Harzwasserwerke, archived from the original (PDF) on 2009-04-19
- Hardanus Hake (1981), Bergchronik (in German), Goslar: Harzverein für Geschichte und Altertumskunde e.V.
- Christoph Bartels (1992), Vom frühneuzeitlichen Montangewerbe bis zur Bergbauindustrie (in German), Bochum: Deutsches Bergbaumuseum
- Christiane Segers-Glocke (2000), Auf den Spuren einer frühen Industrielandschaft (in German), Hameln: Niedersächsisches Landesamt für Denkmalpflege
- Dieter Stoppel (1981), Gangkarte des Oberharzes (in German), Hannover: Bundesanstalt für Geowissenschaften und Rohstoffe
