= Emperor William Shaft =

Coordinates: 51°48′15″N 10°20′40″E

Emperor William Shaft (Kaiser-Wilhelm-Schacht)
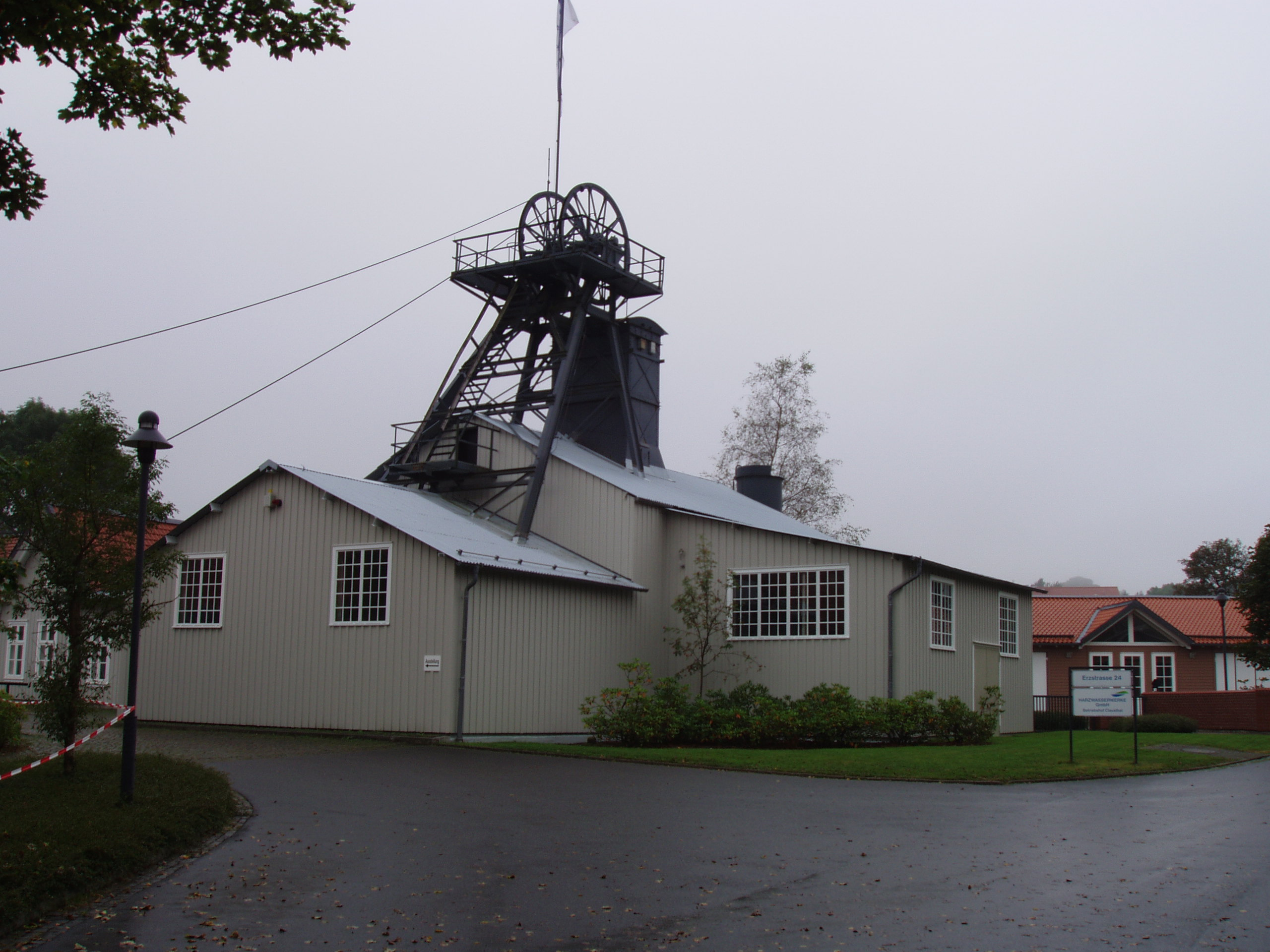
- Shaft house and head frame

- Location within Germany
- Location: Clausthal-Zellerfeld, ,
- Opened: 1 April 1880
- Closed: 31 March 1980

The Emperor William Shaft (German: Kaiser-Wilhelm-Schacht or Schacht Kaiser Wilhelm II.) was the central hoisting and man-riding shaft of the lead and zinc mine in Clausthal-Zellerfeld in the Upper Harz in central Germany.

It was sited on the Burgstatt Lode (Burgstätter Gangzug). The surface installations were located in the borough of Clausthal on No. 24 Erzstraße, near the present-day mining institute of the University of Technology.

== See also ==
- Mining in the Upper Harz

== Literature ==
- Hermann Banniza (1895), Das Berg- und Hüttenwesen des Oberharzes (in German), Stuttgart: Enke – VI. Allgemeiner Deutscher Bergmannstag zu Hannover
- Lutz Markworth (2002), Verschlossen und verriegelt: Bergbaurelikte der Königlich-Preußischen Berginspektion Clausthal (in German), Clausthal-Zellerfeld: Oberharzer Geschichts- und Museumsverein, ISBN 3-9806619-6-2
- Torsten Schröpfer (2000), Fundgrube: Wissenswertes über den Westharzer Bergbau und das Hüttenwesen (in German) (1. ed.), Clausthal-Zellerfeld: Pieper, ISBN 3-923605-08-0 – Schriftenreihe des Oberharzer Geschichts- und Museumsvereins e. V. Clausthal-Zellerfeld
- Axel Funke (1984), Fördergerüste des Oberharzes: die Gerüste am Ottiliae- und Kaiser-Wilhelm-Schacht in Clausthal-Zellerfeld (in German), Clausthal-Zellerfeld: Oberharzer Geschichts- und Museumsverein
