= Upper Harz Mining Museum =

Museum in Germany

Coordinates: 51°49′01″N 10°20′09″E

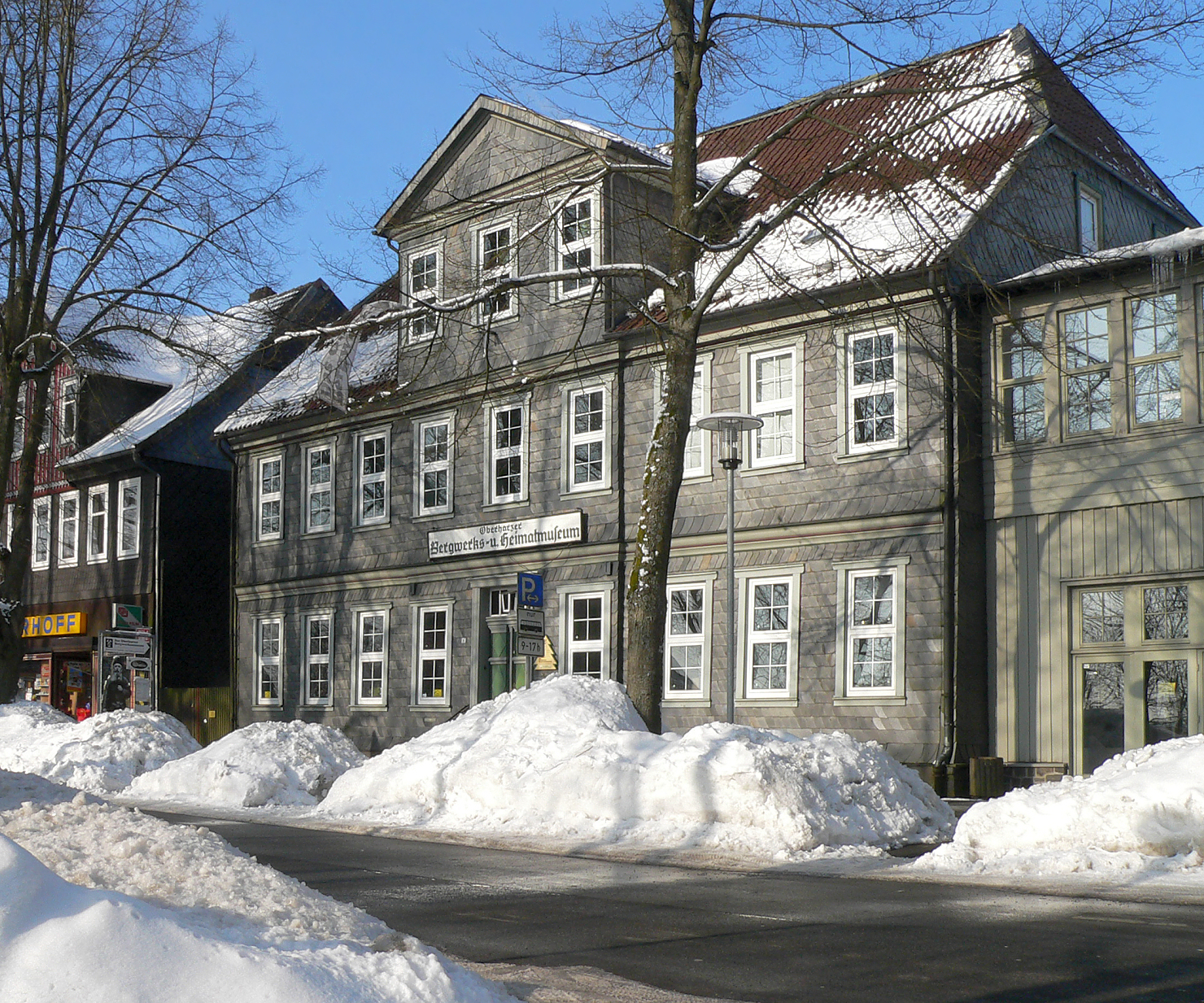
Upper Harz Mining museum

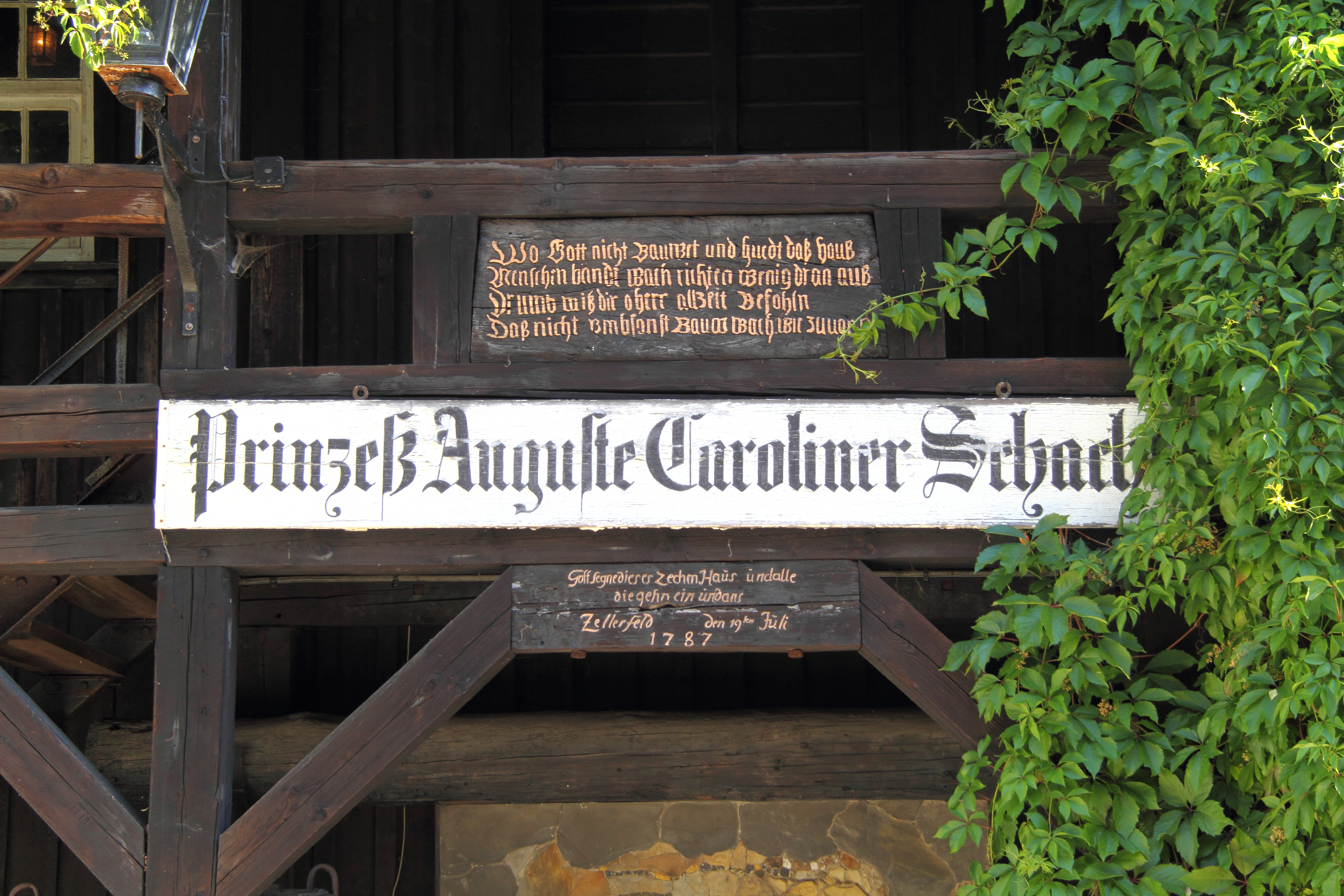
Entrance to a historic mine

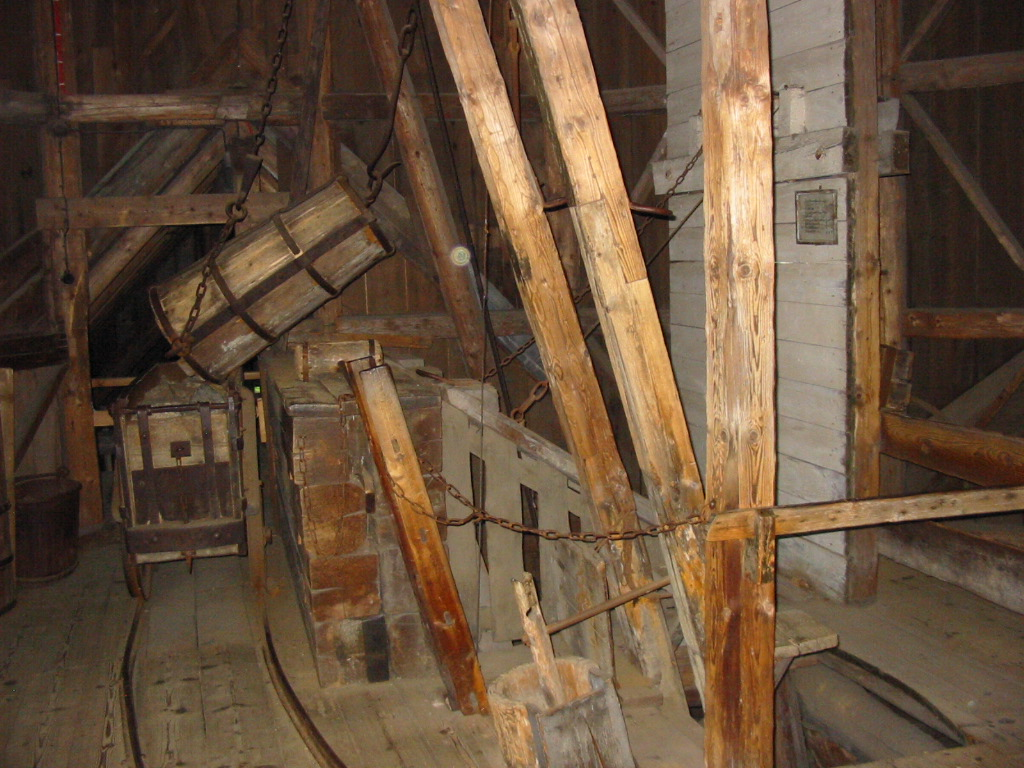
Original pit head from the 19th century

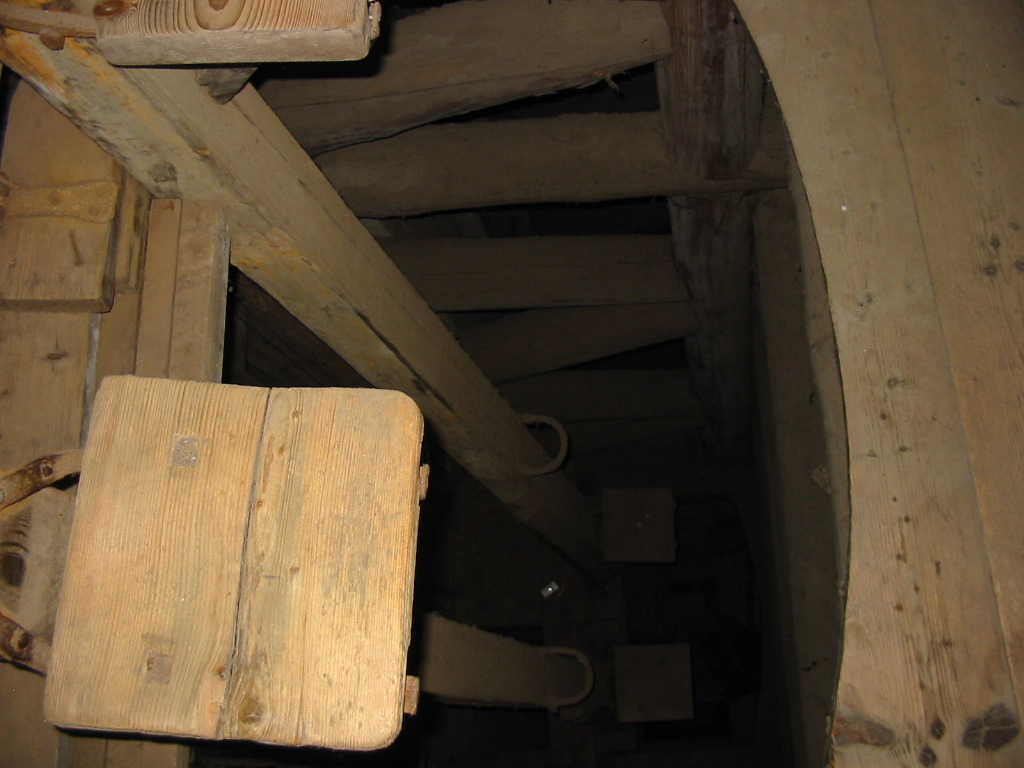
View into the shaft of the show mine with its man engine

The Upper Harz Mining Museum (German: Oberharzer Bergwerksmuseum, pronounced [ˌoːbɐhaːɐ̯tsɐ ˈbɛʁkvɛʁksmuzeːʊm]) is a museum of technological and cultural history in Clausthal-Zellerfeld in the Harz mountains of central Germany. It is one of the oldest technological museums in Germany and concentrates on the history and presentation of mining in the Upper Harz up to the 19th century.

== Exhibits ==
The museum lies in the middle of the district of Zellerfeld within Clausthal-Zellerfeld. Its exhibits include:

- Mock-ups from the former mining school's collection. These were used for training purposes in the 18th and 19th centuries and serve today as an outstanding way of explaining the technology of mining, especially man engines and specialised mining techniques.
- Demonstration mine with visitor galleries, based on original machines and structures from a mine at Bockswiese.
- Open-air site with horse gin (Pferdegaipel), gin house (Radstube), head frame (Kunstgestänge) and crushing mill (Pochwerk) (all relocated from their original sites)
- Presentation of the Upper Harz Water Regale
- Manufacture of the oldest wire cables, invented in 1834 in Clausthal-Zellerfeld by Julius Albert.
- Coins: coinage had a special significance in one of the most important silver-mining regions of Germany.
- Minerals, tools and pit lamps.
- Typical living and working accommodation for ordinary people in the Upper Harz.
- Film show with original photographs of the Silbersegen and Kaiser Wilhelm Mines from the year 1924.

== History ==
The history of the mining museum began in 1884, when the Berghauptmann Adolf Achenbach called upon the miners in a directive to bring in artefacts, especially disused tools associated with historical mining, to put together a collection to start a museum. In 1892 the official foundation of the museum took place in the district of Zellerfeld.

After the previously independent towns of Zellerfeld and Clausthal merged into the 'double-town' of Clausthal-Zellerfeld in 1926 the town hall in Zellerfeld became free. In the years that followed the open land was used to build a demonstration mine.

In the 1960s and 1970s the museum was headed by Herbert Dennert. In this period to the end of the 1980s the mining museum had annual visitor numbers than ran to six figures. But from about 1990 the number of visitors declined markedly for various reasons (e.g. reducing tourism in the Upper Harz, but also with considerably more advertising by other mining museums in the Harz). Nevertheless, around 5.5 million people have visited the Upper Harz Mining Museum to date (as at March 2010).

== Operation ==
The mining museum is operated by the Upper Harz History and Museum Society (Oberharzer Geschichts- and Museumsverein). The municipality of Upper Harz has covered its losses in the past.

The museum runs, as satellite branches, all the above-ground mining facilities of the closed Ottiliae and Kaiser Wilhelm Mines as well as the recently inherited facilities (round gin house, etc.) of the Rosenhof Pit.

The museum also hires out an electronic guide system eGuide Emil, which provides commentary along a walking route that "follows the footsteps of former miners" through the landscape of the disused mines.

== Sources ==
- Helmut Radday: The Oberharzer Bergwerksmuseum Clausthal-Zellerfeld Führer durch das Museum mit einem Abriß zur Kultur- und Technikgeschichte der Oberharzes, 2., überarb. und erw. Aufl. - Oberharzer Geschichts- und Museumsverein, Clausthal-Zellerfeld 2002
