= Roter Bär Pit =

Historic mine in Sankt Andreasberg, Harz

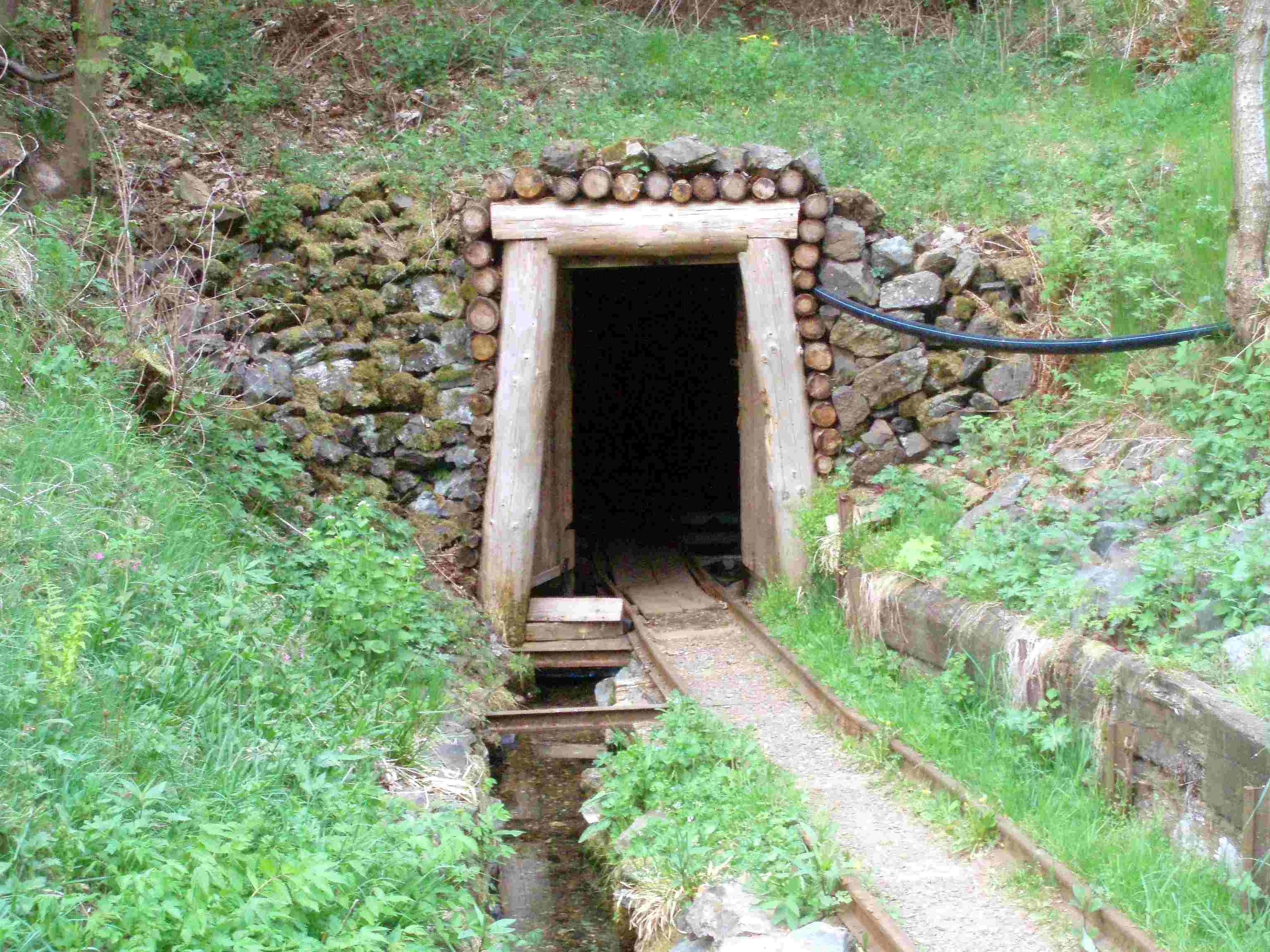
- Entrance to the show mine

- Location in Germany
- Location: Sankt Andreasberg, Goslar district, Landkreis Goslar, Lower Saxony, Germany; 51°42′45″N 010°31′37″E
- Products: iron ore
- Opened: ca. 1800
- Closed: 1860s

The Roter Bär Pit (German: Grube Roter Bär) in Sankt Andreasberg in the Upper Harz is an iron ore mine that was worked from about 1800 until the 1860s. Today it is operated as a show mine under the name of Roter Bär Pit Educational Mine by the Sankt Andreasberg Society for History and Archaeology (Sankt Andreasberger Verein für Geschichte und Altertumskunde). The name Roter Bär means "Red Bear".

In line with historical practice the funds required to restore the historic mine were raised through the formation of a mining trades union and issue of share certificates.

== History ==
The former iron ore mine situated in the Bären valley at the foot of the Knöchel, east of Sankt Andreasberg forms the heart of the educational Roter Bär Pit today.

The mining of brown iron ore, which occurs here as lens-shaped inclusions in a Middle Devonian shale-limestone series, began around 1800 and ended in the mid-1860s. The pit, which was operated by private individuals (Eigenlehnern), produced about 50-60 tons of ironstone annually with a workforce of just 4-6 men. The very soft, often clayey, ore was won using picks (Keilhauen) without the need for drilling and blasting. Simple hand picking enabled it to be enriched by up to 35-40% Fe content. Its only customer was the Hanoverian state's Königshütte smelting works in Lauterberg (founded 1733).

Despite only moderate levels of iron content, this ore was in great demand because of its good smelting properties and high proportion of manganese. Blended with red iron ore from the Sieber valley enabled good wrought iron and cable iron (Seileisen) to be produced. During this period a network of relatively shallow pits with a total length of more than 1,000 metres were dug. Today these pits have largely been filled in or collapsed and are only accessible in a few places.

With the transfer of Hanover to Prussia (in 1866) and the introduction of charcoal blast furnaces at the Königshütte smelter (in 1871) the ore from the Roter Bär no longer had a market. The mine was abandoned and fell into ruins.

10 years after the establishment of silver mining at St. Andreasberg (the Samson Pit, in 1910), the old mine was worked again by the firm of Ilseder Hütte based at Groß-Bülten near Peine as part of a national exploration programme. Although the unworkability of the collapsed and practically exhausted deposit rapidly became clear, the search for as yet still undiscovered lodes of metal continued until 1923.

For about 10 years trial digs were driven northwards and northeast into the mountain, work that employed up to 42 miners. Prospecting was not only carried out at the level of the surface galleries, but also at a depth of 170 m at the face of the Sieber gallery, (the drainage gallery of the St. Andreasberg mining field). From the Wennsglückter lode from where the tunnel was long enough, the 700 m long Bär cross passage was built running northwards. Despite the driving of trial pits with a total length of about 4 km it did not prove economical to recoverable the ore reserves. The weak and relatively low metal-poor lodes (Hermannsglücker, Wilhelmsglücker and Ernst lodes) that were discovered turned out at least to be mineralogically very interesting. Highlights include the arsenide nickel-cobalt ores, and a complex composition of selenide mineralizations.

== Visitor mine ==
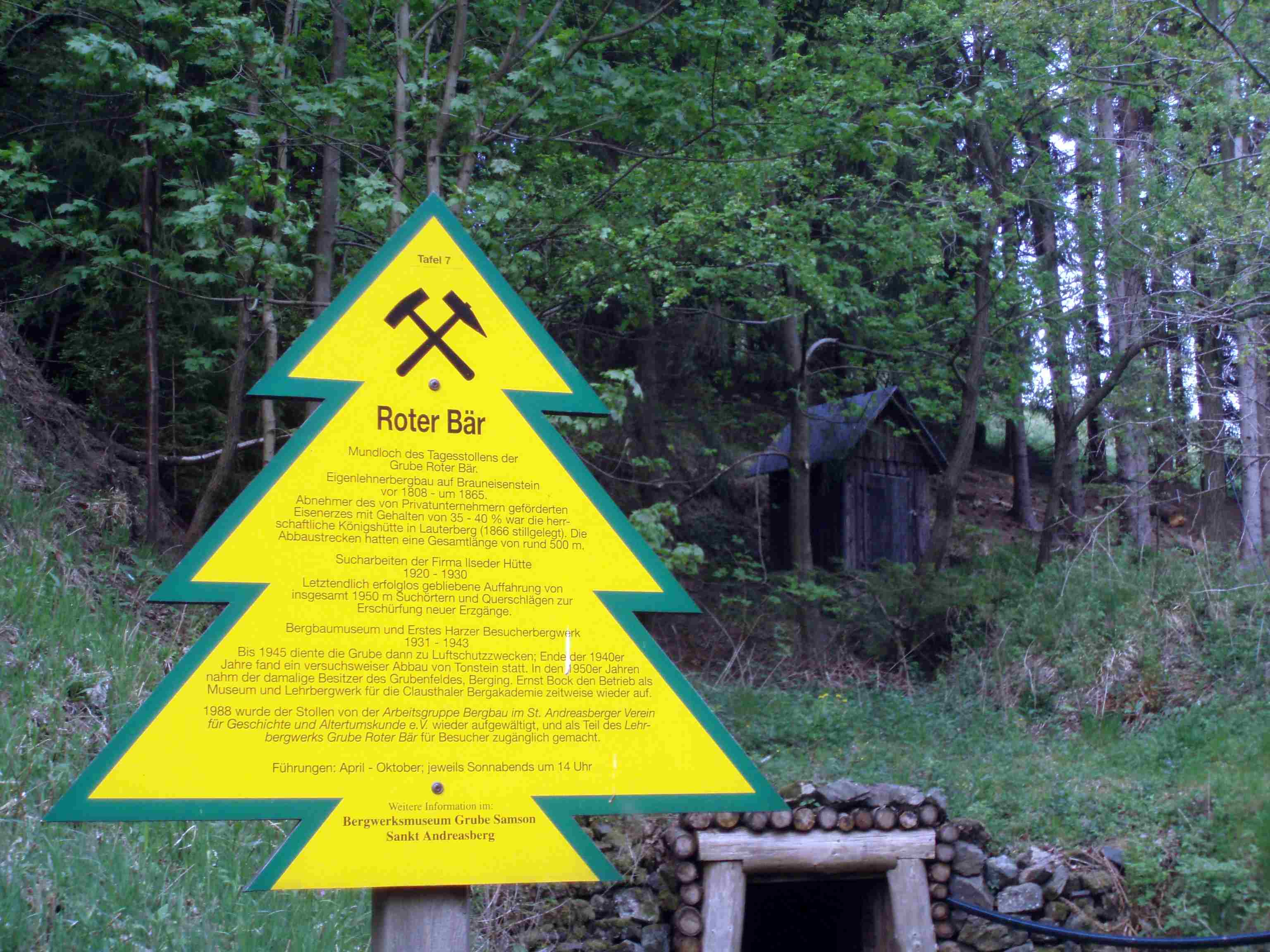
A Dennert Fir Tree at the entrance to the show mine

In 1931 the newly founded Sankt Andreasberg Society for History and Archaeology took the pit over and established the first visitor mine in the Harz. After 10 years guided tours came to a standstill due to the Second World War. The site, which now acted as an air-raid shelter, saved the lives of many people who fled here during the fighting in April 1945.

From 1947-1949 there were again unsuccessful attempts to mine the remaining clay minerals in eastern field of the mine. In the early 1950s when the historical society devoted itself to the creation of a mining museum on the Samson Pit, the then owner of the mining field, Berging. Dr. Ernst Bock took over the gallery and used it occasionally as an educational mine for the Clausthal Mining Academy. Later the site fell into decay. In 1988 the surface gallery was opened by the mining working group again, and made partially accessible to visitors.

The pit is not just used as a visitor mine, however; it is also to supply drinking water and, during the winter, acts as sheltered haven for bats. In addition, work is underway to carry out further research and to preserve and protect the old mine workings. Great importance is attached to ensuring they are preserved as far as possible in their original state.

=== Sponsor ===
- Mining Working Group (Arbeitsgruppe Bergbau),
  Sankt Andreasberg Society for History and Archaeology (St. Andreasberger Verein für Geschichte und Altertumskunde e. V.), founded in 1931

== See also ==
- List of mines in the Harz

== Sources ==
- Ließmann, Wilfried (1998), St. Andreasberger Verein für Geschichte und Altertumskunde e. V. (ed.), "Die Betriebsgeschichte der Grube Roter Bär", Beiträge zur Bergbaugeschichte von St. Andreasberg (in German), vol. Band 1, St. Andreasberg, pp. 33–40
- Ließmann, Wilfried (2002), Der Bergbau am Beerberg bei Sankt Andreasberg : Ein (Wander)Führer durch den "Auswendigen Grubenzug" sowie die Anlagen des Lehrbergwerks Grube Roter Bär. (in German), Duderstadt: Mecke, ISBN 3-932752-90-2
