= List of mines in the Harz =

This list contains an overview of the mines in the Harz Mountains of central Germany, formerly one of the most productive mining regions in the world.

== Bad Grund ==
- Grund Ore Mine

== Bad Harzburg ==
- Hansa Iron Ore Mine Pit, Göttingerode
- Friederike Iron Ore Mine Pit

== Bad Lauterberg ==
- Wolkenhügel Pit, Bad Lauterberg (closed 2007)

== Hahnenklee ==
=== Hahnenklee Field ===
- August Gallery
- Aufcontainingtigkeit Pit, 1741 - 1761, 42 m depth, probably silver ore
- Pit Beständigkeit Pit, 1739 - 1816 (1828), 90 m depth, silver-containing galena
- Herzogin Philipina Charlotte Pit, 1745 - 1802, probably silver-containing galena
- Johann Georg Pit, 1748 - 1754, probably silver-containing galena
- Morgenröte Pit, 1679 - 1684, probably silver ore
- St. Edmund Pit (upper and lower), 1620 - 1739 (1828), 70 m depth, probably silver ore
- Pit Theodora, ab 1816 Theodora and Beständigkeit, 1741 - 1828, 90 m depth, silver-containing galena
- Lautenthaler Hoffnungsstollen, built 1745 - 1799, length 4 km, 158 m deep in the Theodora Shaft, today a drinking water reservoir

=== Bockswiese Field ===
- Alter Gesellschafter Shaft
- Alter Treibschacht
- Christiane Sophie, a pinge
- Erbtiefster Shaft
- Brauner Hirsch Pit , 1690 - 1755, 70 m depth, silver and copper ores
- Grüne Linde Pit , 1693 - 1724, probably silver ore
- Grüne Tanne and Kahlebergsglück Pit
- Elisabeth Julians Pit
- Haus Hannover Pit , 1718 - 1721, probably silver ore
- Haus Wolfenbüttel Pit , 1718 - 1760, 60 m depth, probably silver ore
- Hermann Pit , 1681 - 1696, probably silver ore
- Herzog Anton Ulcontaining Pit , 1673 - 1807, 210 m depth, silver-containing galena
- Herzog August Wilhelm Pit , 1672 - 1738, probably silver ore
- Herzog August Pit, 1663 - 1681 (1931), 75 m depth, silver-containing galena
- Herzog August and Johann Friedcontaining Pit, 1681 - 1931, 430 m depth, silver-containing galena
- Johann Friedcontaining Pit, 1670 - 1681 (1931), 40 m depth, silver-containing galena
- Herzog Georg Wilhelm Pit , 1664 - 1718, probably silver ore
- Landes Herrn Pit
- Neue Gesellschaft Pit , 1670 - 1745, 135 m depth, probably silver ore
- Neuer Edmund Pit , 1718 - 1755, kein Erzfund
- Neues Zellerfeld Pit , 1703 - 1745, 110 m depth, probably silver-containing galena
- Prinzen Pit , 1691 - 1705, 40 m depth, probably silver ore
- Silberner Bock Pit
- Silberner Georg Pit , 1692 - 1696, probably silver ore
- Stadt Braunschweig Pit , 1673 - 1686, probably silver ore
- Zellerfelder Hoffnung Pit, 1716 - 1866, 40 m depth, probably silver-containing galena
- Grumbacher Gallery, built 1719 - 1730, length 1.8 km
- Kahlenberg Shaft, 1922 - 1929, prospecting shaft
- 1st Lichtloch Shaft
- 3rd Lichtloch Shaft
- Drei Bäre Shaft'
- Haus Braunschweig Shaft
- Kahlenbergsglück Shaft
- Neues Lichtloch Shaft

== Clausthal-Zellerfeld ==
=== Burgstätte Field ===
- Caroline Pit
- Dorothea Pit
- Englische Treue Pit
- Kaiser Wilhelm Shaft
- Königin Marien Shaft

=== Zellerfeld Field ===
- Ring and Silberschnur Pit
- Silberne Schreibfeder Pit
- Neuer Johanneser Shaft

=== Rosenhof Field ===
- Rosenhof Pit
- Turmhof Pit
- Ottiliae Shaft
- Silbersegener Shaft

=== Haus Herzberg Field ===
- New Hausherzberg Shaft

== Goslar ==
- Rammelsberg Ore Mine
- Glockenberg Pit
- Großfürstin Alexandra Pit
- Nordberg Pit
- Ratsschiefer Pit

== Lautenthal ==
- Lautenthalsglück Pit

== Sankt Andreasberg ==
- Roter Bär Pit Educational Mine
- Samson Pit
- Wennsglückt Pit

== Schulenberg im Harz (Upper and Middle Schulenberg) ==
including Festenburg im Harz

=== Bockswiese Field (eastern section), formerly Bockswiese-Schulenberg-Festenburg Field ===
- Altenauer Hoffnung Gallery
- Festenburg Gallery, mentioned in 1720
- Gelbe Lilie Pit / Neue Gelbe Lilie Pit , 1669 - 1817, 250 m depth, silver ore, chalcopyrite
- Glücksrad Pit, 1666 - 1824, 250 m depth, silver ore, chalcopyrite
- Gnade Gottes Pit , 1673 - 1769, 270 m depth, probably silver ore, chalcopyrite
- Haus Kronenburg Pit, 1691 - 1705 (1795), 145 m depth, probably silver ore
- Herzog August Wilhelm Pit, 1703 - 1754, 125 m depth, probably silver-containing galena
- Juliane Sophia Pit, 1776 - 1904, 400 m depth, silver-containing galena
- König Karl Pit, 1711 -1716, probably silver-containing galena
- Kronenburgs Glück Pit, 1705 - 1795, 292 m depth, silver-containing galena
- Kron Festenburg Pit
- Königin Elisabeth Pit, 1713 - 1803, probably silver-containing galena
- Neue Gelbe Lilie Pit , siehe Gelbe Lilie
- Neuer Engel Pit , 1710 - 1736, probably silver-containing galena
- Neues Schulenbergs Glück Pit , see St. Martins Mine
- Prinzen Pit , 1705 - 1737, 190 m depth, probably silver-containing galena
- Schulenbergs Glück Pit , 1690 - 1705 (1795), silver-containing galena
- St. Anna am Schulenberge Pit
- St. Urban Pit , 1692 - 1814, 253 m depth, silver-containing galena, chalcopyrite
- Unvergängliche Gabe and Reiche Gesellschaft am Schulenberge Pit
- Weißer Schwan Pit, 1691 - 1799, 290 m depth, probably silver-containing galena
- Kleine Mertens Zeche, 1691 - 1738 (1803), probably silver ore
- Caroline Shaft
- Grüne Tanne Shaft
- Schulenberger Gallery
- St. Martins Mine (Mertens Mine), 1697 -1791, probably silver-containing galena
- Tiefer Schulenberger Gallery, built vor 1600 - 1745, length 2,9 km
- Kaiser Heinreich Mine
- St. Johannes über Kaiser Heincontaining am Schulenberge Mine

== Sieber Valley ==
- Aurora Pit in the Sieber valley (1900–1922; baryte)

== Wildemann ==
- Ernst August Pit
- 19 Lachter Gallery and 13 Lachter Gallery

== Elbingerode ==
- Büchenberg
- Drei Kronen & Ehrt

== Straßberg ==
=== Straßberg-Neudorfer Field ===
- Glasebach Pit
- Glücksstern
- Frohe Zukunft
- Getreuer Bergmann (1712-1733)
- Tiefer- or Hütten Gallery
- Richt Shaft
- Glückauf Pit (1712-1744)
- Kreuz Pit (1747-1758)
- Maria Anna Pit
- Teufels Pit

== Wettelrode ==
- Röhrigschacht

== Ilfeld ==
- Rabenstein Gallery

== See also ==
- Mining in the Upper Harz
