= Salzbergwerk Berchtesgaden =

- Native name: Südwestdeutsche Salzwerke AG
- Industry: Salt mining
- Founded: 1517
- Headquarters: Bergwerkstraße 83, D-83471 Berchtesgaden, Germany
- Website: www.salzbergwerk.de/en

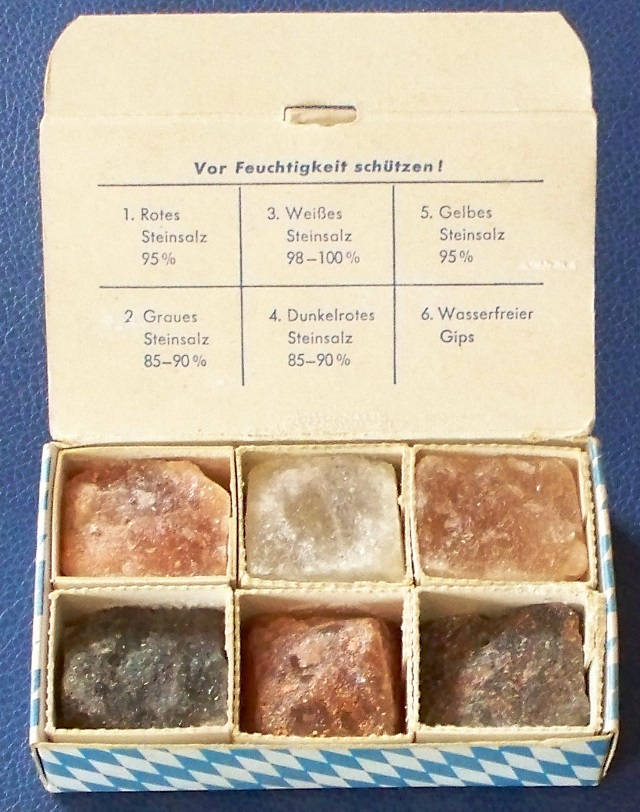
Salzbergwerk Berchtesgaden - types of salt

Salzbergwerk Berchtesgaden is the oldest active salt mine in Germany, in which salt is mainly extracted in the wet, and also a showcase in Berchtesgaden, Bavaria.

== History ==
The salt mining industry in Berchtesgaden formed before the 13th century and was the economic backbone of the Berchtesgaden Provostry.

Already Eberwin, the first Stiftspropst of Berchtesgaden, had access to the first salt springs during his reign (1101-1142). Propst Dietrich (1174-1178) was the first to break down the salt on the estates of the monastery Berchtesgaden, but also began to trade with it.

== Tourist attraction ==
A visit to the mine is open for tourists and is used annually by about 330,000 visitors. The track length of the visitor mine is about 1400 meters and vehicles used for passenger transport are from 1995. The track is powered by a direct current of 400 volts supplied via a lateral current rail.

== See also ==
- List of oldest companies
