= Zeche Neuglück & Stettin =

- Location within Germany
- Location: Nordrhein-Westfalen, 51°24′46″N 7°18′20″E
- Opened: 1758
- Closed: 1934

The Zeche Neuglück & Stettin (Neuglück & Stettin Mine) in Witten-Muttental is a former mine, also known as the Zeche Stettin & Neuglück. It was created in the Stadtforst Mutteltal as a result of the Niemeyersche Karte, where there is now a fire station and is west of today's Berghauser Straße. The Stettin tunnel is now a component of the Bergbauwanderweg Muttental Muttental Mining trail.

== History ==
=== The beginnings ===
From 1758 the mine known as Zeche Neuglück, Zeche Neue Glück or Zeche Neuglück Gerichts Herbede began operation. In 1770 an exploration tunnel was dug under the Mausegatt and the underbank of the Mausegatt. Johann Caspar Dürholt, Johann Peter Kickut und Peter Caspar Hilby were its initial explorers (Muter). The explorers coveted a mining claim (Grubenfeld) with a large, previously unknown deposit (Fundgrube) and 20 Maaßen (claim area, in Austria corresponds to an area of 48.000 m²). Until they received the necessary licenses they were prohibited from extracting any coal. On August 28 of that year they were instructed by the Bergamt of Bergmeister Heintzmann to begin a visual inspection. The Bergamtes then instructed the prospectors (Muter) to begin this inspection. The inspection then took place on November 21. On the December 12th, 1770 Johann Caspar Dürholt, Johann Peter Kickut und Peter Caspar Hyby registered as shop stewards (Gewerken) in accordance with the mining authority (Bergamt). On March 11, 1772 they requested investment from Berlin and the concession was granted at the same time. On May 8, 1772 the construction of the initial mining seam began. The field had the size of a Fundgrube and 20 Maaßen. The mine was recorded in the Niemeyerschen Karte in 1787 and had a western facing adit. After the mine's first year it was still a small operation and the Bergamt of the Gerwerke withdrew the permit. The grounds for this measure lay in both the exit and entry seams. Both of these seams laid above the Mausgatt and its lower bank and the bureau of mines instructed it to be disassembled. The mine was then shut down in 1796. The mine remained in this state until the 19th century. In 1811 the St.-Johannes-Erbstollen sough connected with the mines.

=== The Later Years ===
In 1824 the mine restored its operations under a new name as Zeche Neuglück & Stettin. Meanwhile, the stud has progressed so far that Underground mine ventilation through a shaft required improvements. In November of the same year, construction of the Wilhelm shaft had begun. The shaft was dug and supported along the seam. For its construction, the Wilhelm shaft was first equipped with Haspel (hoists). Under certain weather conditions the mine workings were vulnerable to changing weather conditions (Wetterwechsel). The mine was then properly aligned in 1825 and later in the same year its vulnerability was reduced. The mining of coal was then carried out through an adit in Muttenal. This adit was added to the west of the Muttenbachs. The adit was later extended further into the Mausgatt. In 1830, the Wilhelm shaft was extended to further depths. In 1835 it reached the Göpelschacht Wilhelm which intersection with the tunnels at St. Johannes Erbstollen. The shaft now had a depth of 57 Lachter. Later in that same year the Wilhelm shaft was equipped with a Horse mill. The subsidized coal was then transported by day to Bergisches Land. By night, the drivers provided supplies for the construction of the mine's guesthouse, "Zur alten Tür" (To the old door).

The waste water ("Wasserlösung") was now carried out through St. Johannes Erbstollen. Later in the same year the supports above the tunnel were improved. In 1836 construction of supports for the Gerhard shaft had begun to be installed. The Gerhard shaft was located 300 meters to the east of the Wilhelm shaft and was pushed to further depths. The Gerhard shaft was also equipped with a horse mill. In 1843 the coal reserves in the Wilhelm shaft were depleted. The mine was then shut down in 1850. The horse mill in the Gerhard shaft was dismantled and then sold. In the period between May 29, 1854 and October 18, 1856, Zeche Neuglück & Stettin was consolidated under the St. Johannes Erbstollens to become the Zeche Herberholz. The purpose of this consolidation was to allow for a transition to a mine which would be able to reach deeper deposits. On November 2, 1926 the mine entered operation. The purpose of this re-commissioning was to move past the degraded ore which had been above the St. Johannes Erbstollens. The Paul and Hugo shafts were dug later that year. Both shafts had depths of 35 meters. Altogether, there were two tunnels in operation. In 1934 the Zeche Neuglück & Stettin was shut down again. On April 9 of that same year, it de-registered all of its miners. The day office was then closed and its tunnels were filled with water. After World War II a second, smaller mine named Zeche Neuglück II for deep extraction would be in operation for a few years.

== Development and Workforce ==
The first financial figures were from 1830, which provided funding for 1836 tons of Bituminous coal. In 1835 the mine was then able to develop 2514 tons of coal. In 1840, this amount increased to 3216 tons. The first workforce survey was in 1845, where between 9 and 16 miners were counted, and funding was provided for the extraction of 36,024 bushels of coal. In 1847 there were between eight and twelve miners in the mine and the funding allowed for the extraction of 31,672 bushels of coal. In 1926 the funding then allowed for 228 tons of coal. There were eleven miners and 3410 tons of coal extracted in 1929, this was simultaneously the maximum allowance of the mines. In 1930, there were five miners who extraction 944 tons of coal. The last known funding and survey of the mine was in 1934, with four miners and funding for the extraction of 945 tons of coal.
