= Dennert Fir Tree =

German sign board

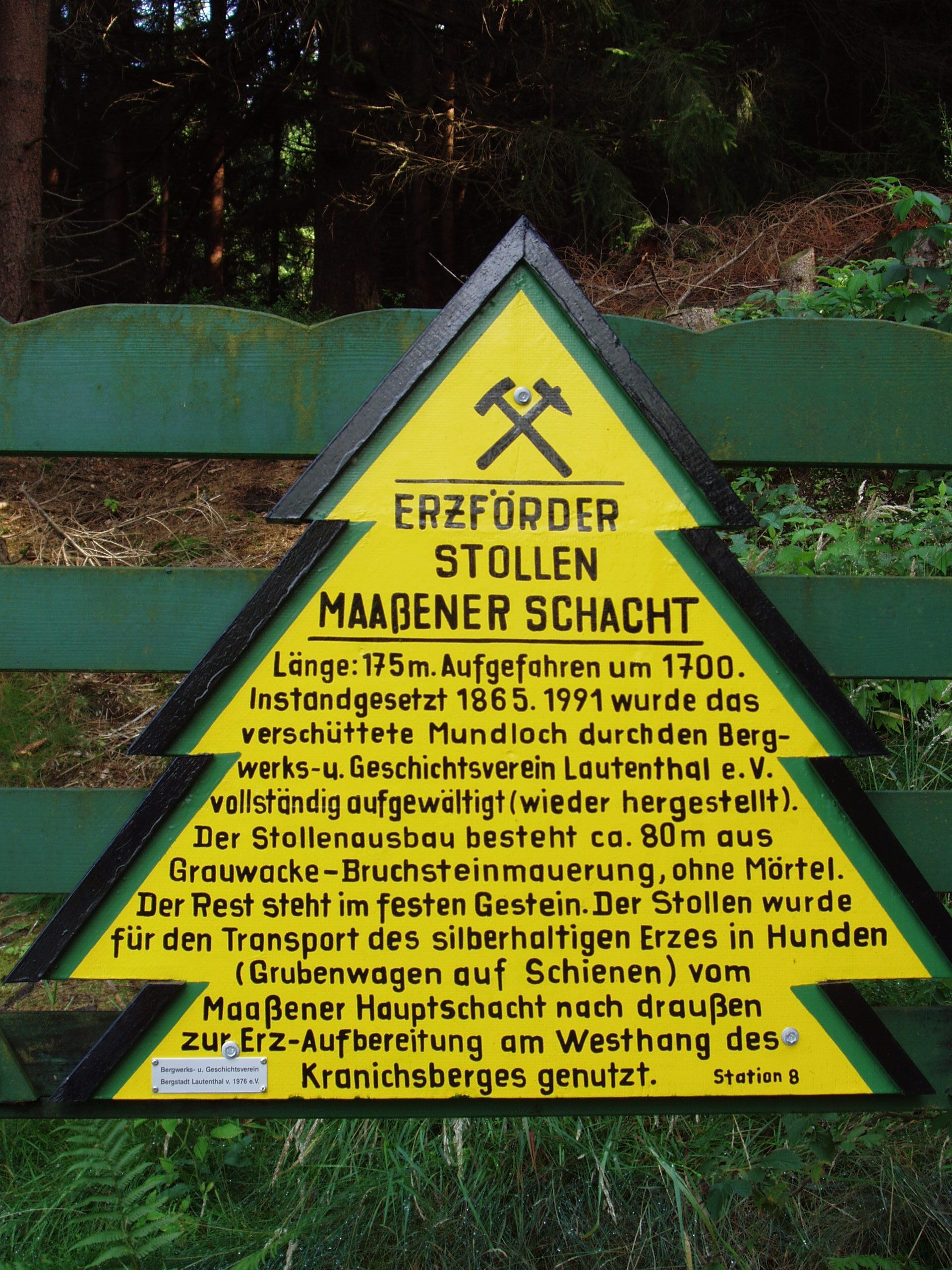
Dennert Fir at the Erzläuferstollen Pit, Maaßen, Lautenthaler Gangzug, Lautenthal

The Dennert Fir Tree (German: Dennert-Tanne, also known as the Dennert’ scher Tannenbaum, Dennert-Tafel or Dennert-Fichte) is a signboard that is used throughout the Harz mountains in Germany to provide information about mining and other points of interest in the area. The signboards mark locations, traces and monuments to mining, to the Upper Harz Water Regale, a medieval water management system, or even personalities in mining history in the Upper Harz mining area. They have since become used to document other notable sites within the Harz.

The first Dennert Fir Tree was set up on 9 October 1949 in the vicinity of the former Sarepta Pit (Grube Sarepta) in Clausthal. It was sponsored by the Power and Water Management Division (Kraft- und Wasserwirtschaft GmbH) of Preussag AG, the operator of the Upper Harz Water Regalem at that time. The instigator was Oberbergrat Herbert Dennert (1902–1994). Dennert promoted the preservation of mining monuments and published several books about mining in the Upper Harz.

The signs measure 75 cm × 80 cm (30 in × 31 in) and are mainly made of wood and have the characteristic shape of a stylised fir tree. They are painted yellow with a green and black border. Underneath a hammer and pick symbol, the type of site is described together with important information. The texts were researched and published from 1949 to 1981 by Herbert Dennert. The Upper Harz History and Museum Society maintain over 200 signs within an area of 100 km^{2} (39 sq mi).

Dennert Fir Trees that are set up by municipalities or branches of the Harz Club have the shield of their respective village at the top instead of the hammer and pick. For example, the Braunlage branch sponsors around 60 signs (as at April 9).

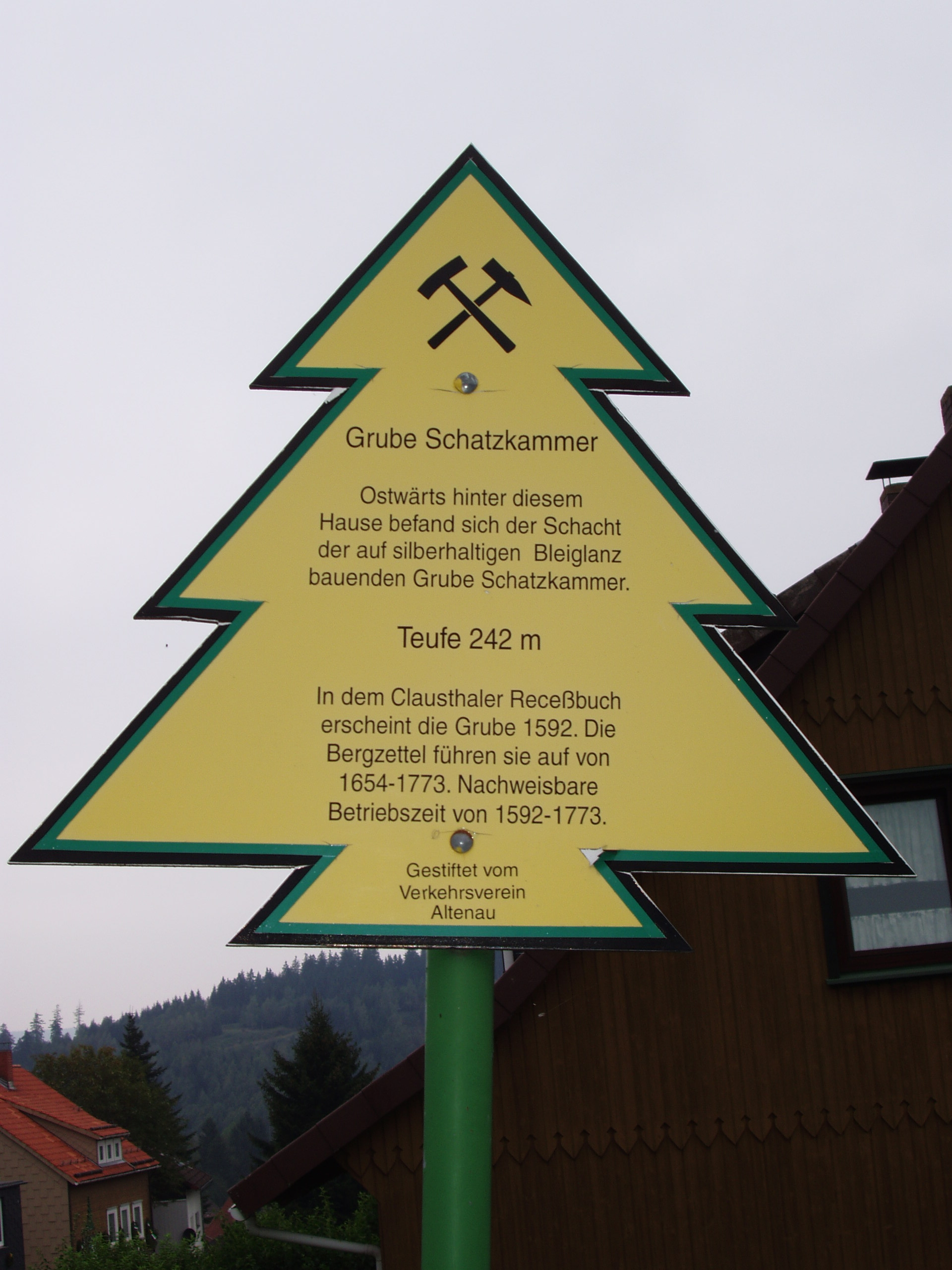
Schatzkammer Pit, Schatzkammer Gang, Altenau

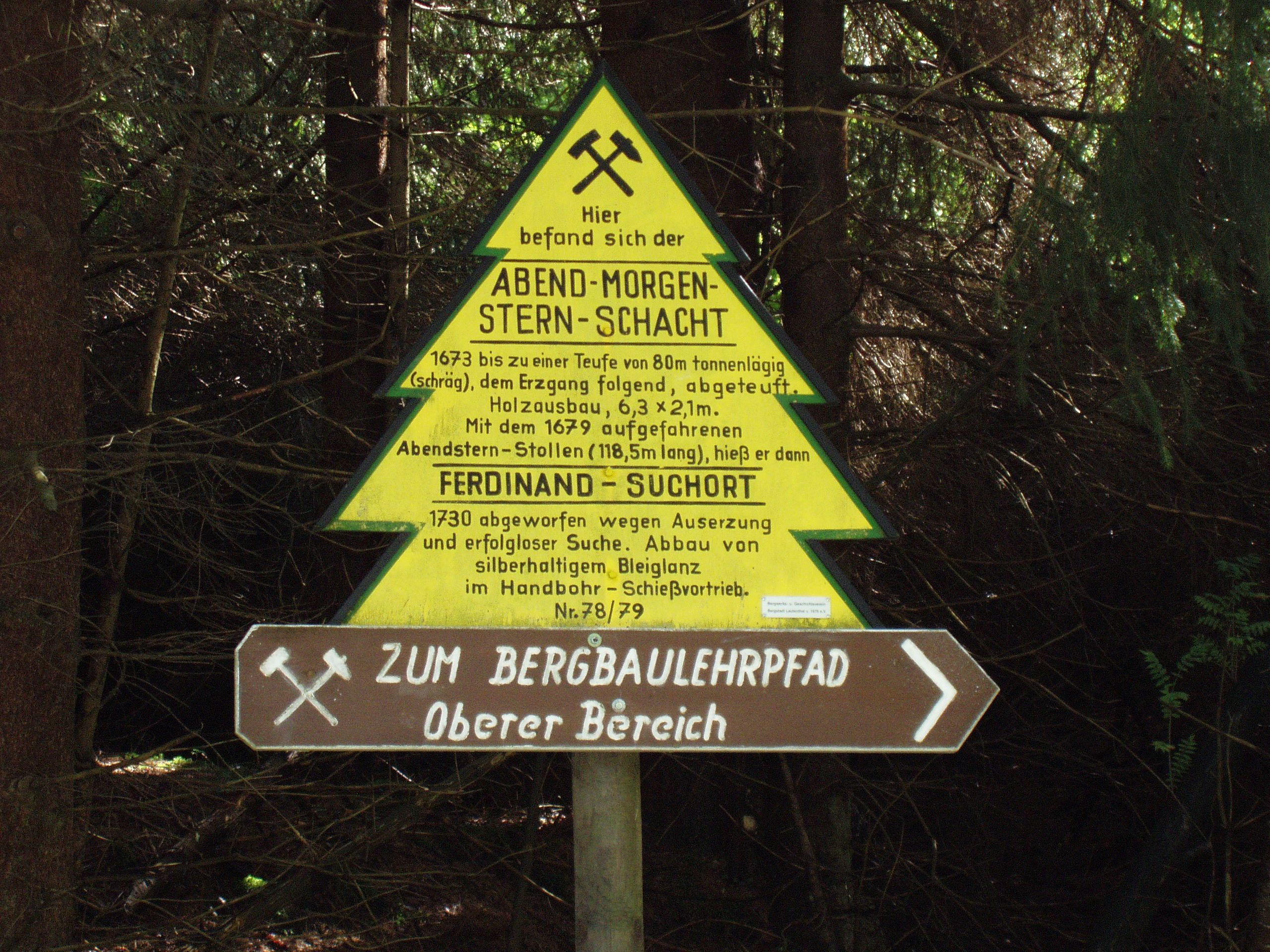
Morgen/ Abendstern Pit, Lautenthaler Gangzug, Lautenthal

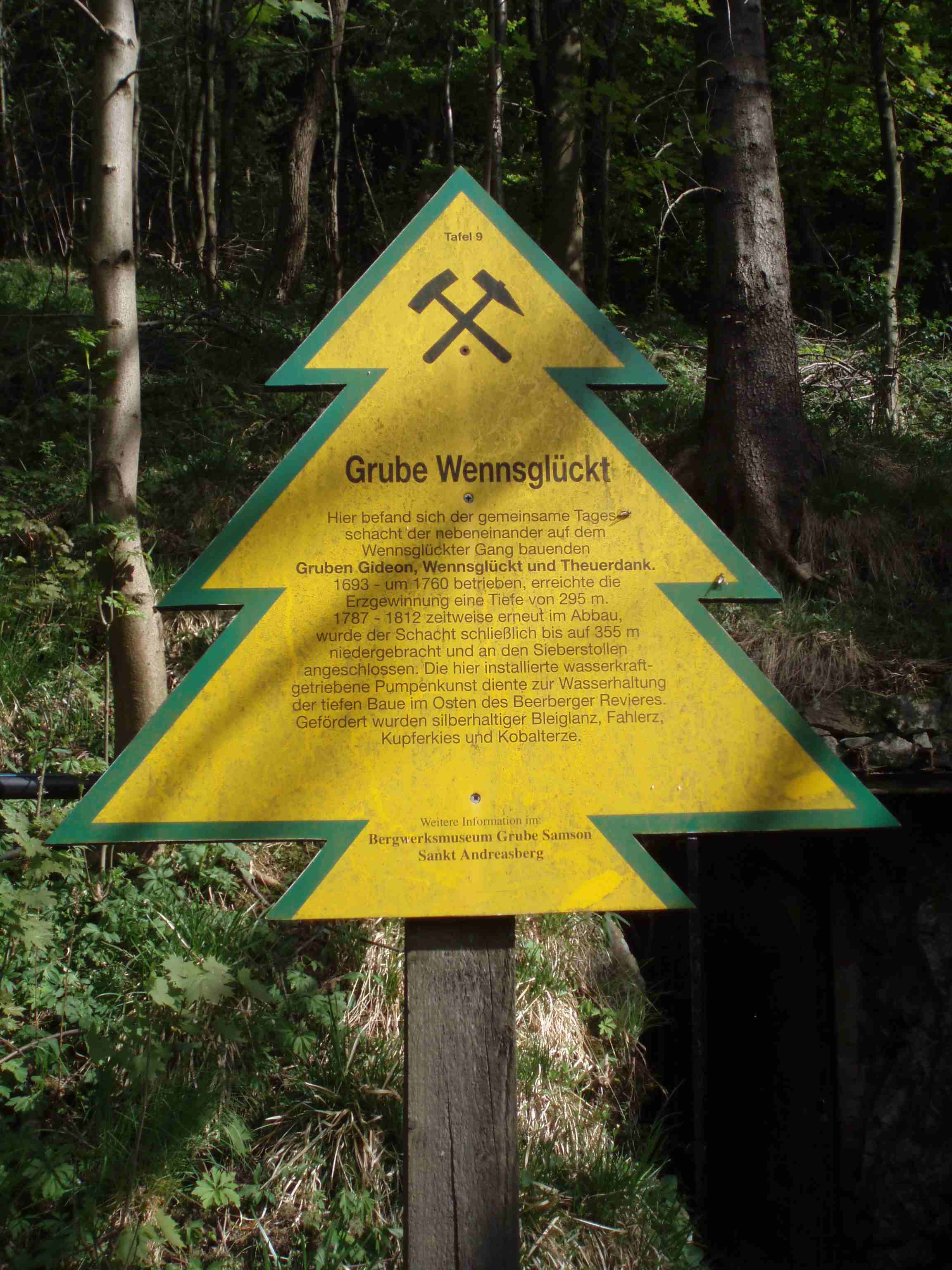
Wennsglückt Pit, St. Andreasberg

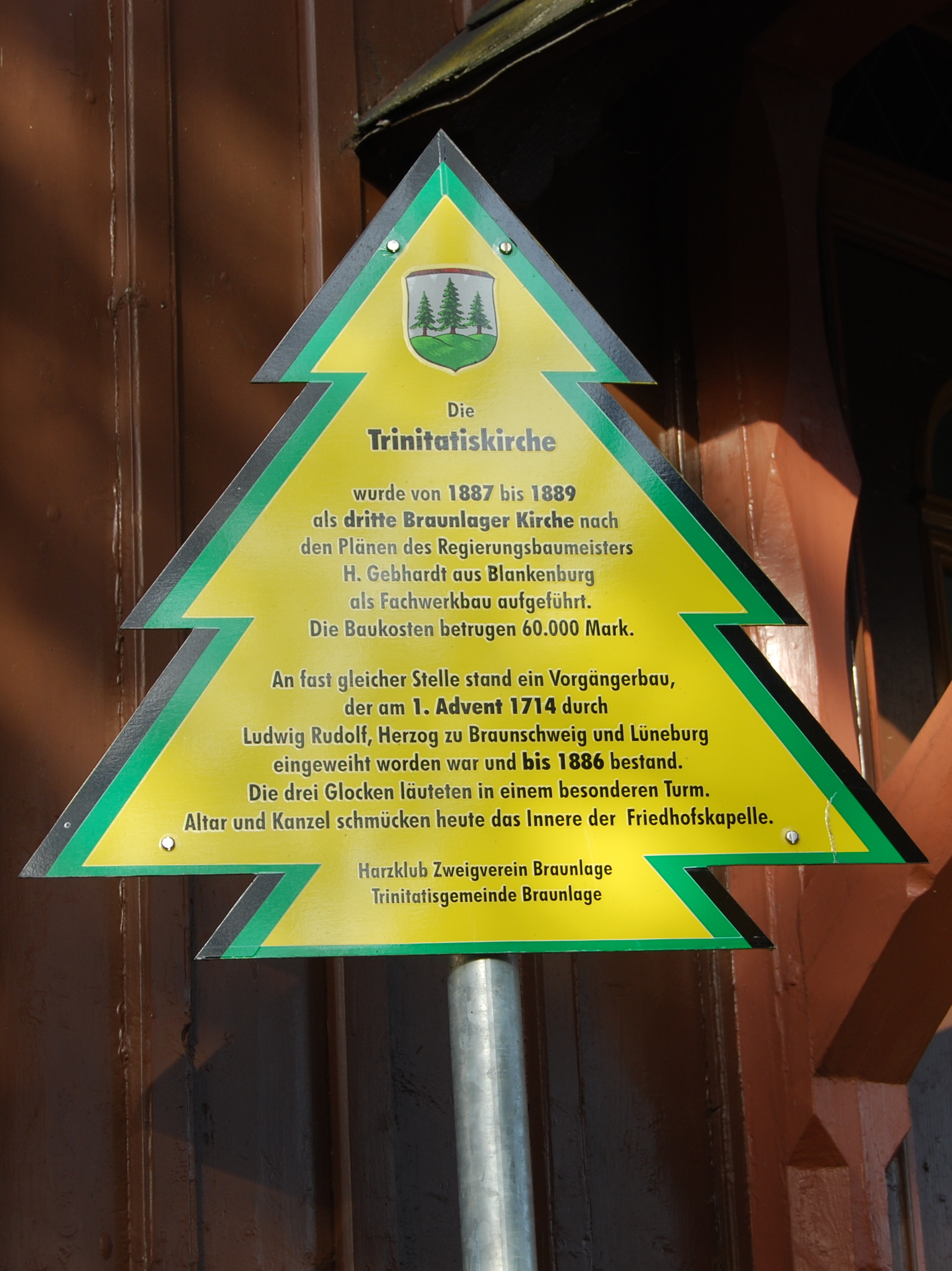
Holy Trinity Church in Braunlage

== Sources ==
- Torsten Schröpfer (2000), Fundgrube: Wissenswertes über den Westharzer Bergbau und das Hüttenwesen (in German) (1. ed.), Clausthal-Zellerfeld: Pieper, ISBN 3-923605-08-0
