= Samson Pit =

Historic mine in Lower Saxony

Samson Mine
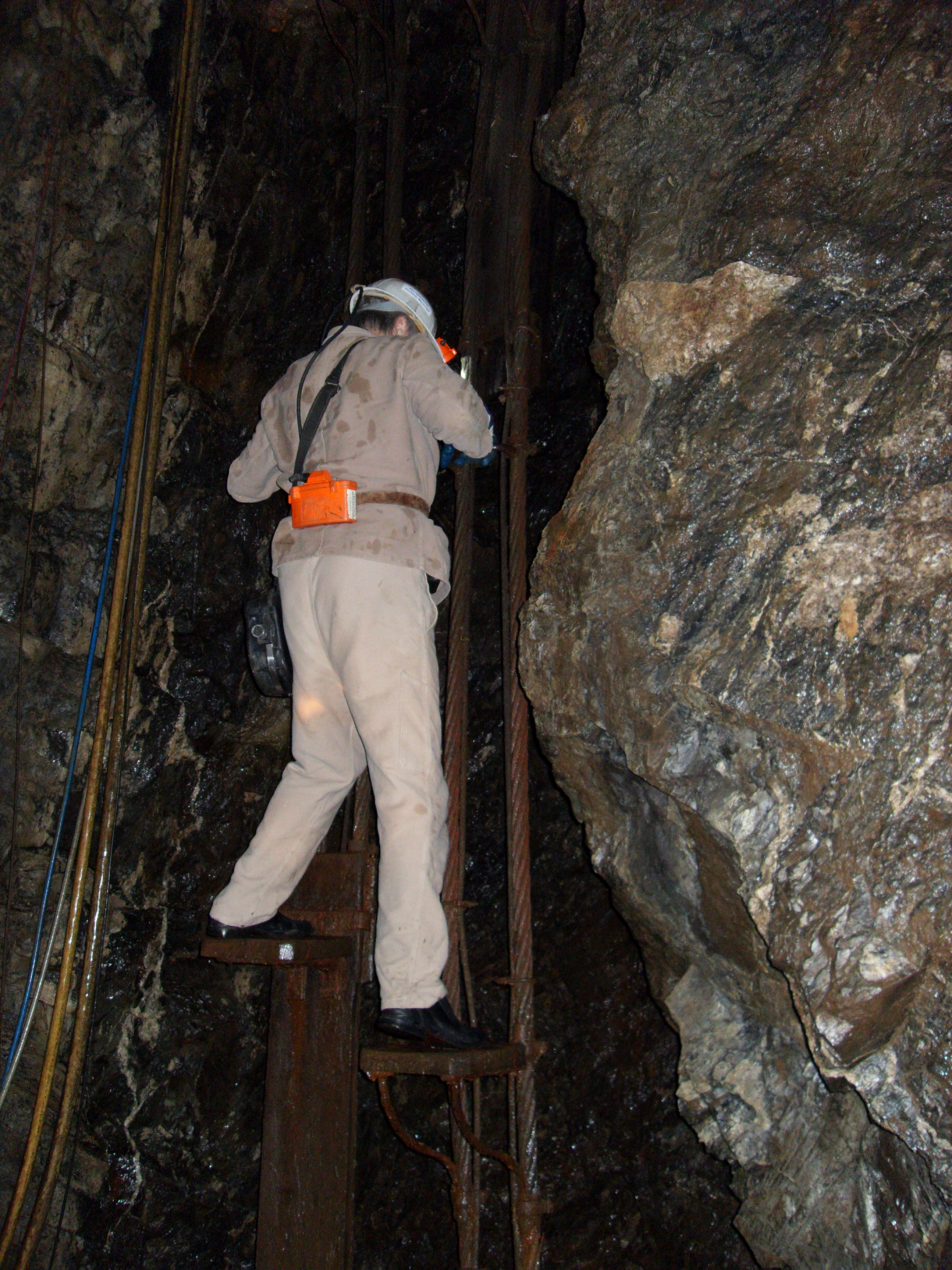
- Miner exiting the Samson Pit using the man engine

- Location in Germany
- Location: Sankt Andreasberg, Lower Saxony, Germany; 51°42′46.27″N 10°31′04.01″E
- Products: Silver
- Greatest depth: 840 m (2,760 ft)
- Opened: ca. 1521
- Closed: 31 March 1910

The Samson Pit or Samson Mine (German: Grube Samson) is an historic silver mine in Sankt Andreasberg in the Upper Harz region of central Germany.

The pit has one of the oldest man engines in the world still working and it can be seen in operation during guided tours. The man engine, installed in the Samson Pit in 1837, used to be driven by the water power of the Rehberg Ditch (Rehberger Graben). The start of this ditch is the Oderteich reservoir, which is part of the Upper Harz Water Regale. The large water wheel (with a 12m diameter), which drove the man engine until 1922, is only powered by water today for demonstration purposes; an electric motor has taken over the operation of the man engine.

== History ==
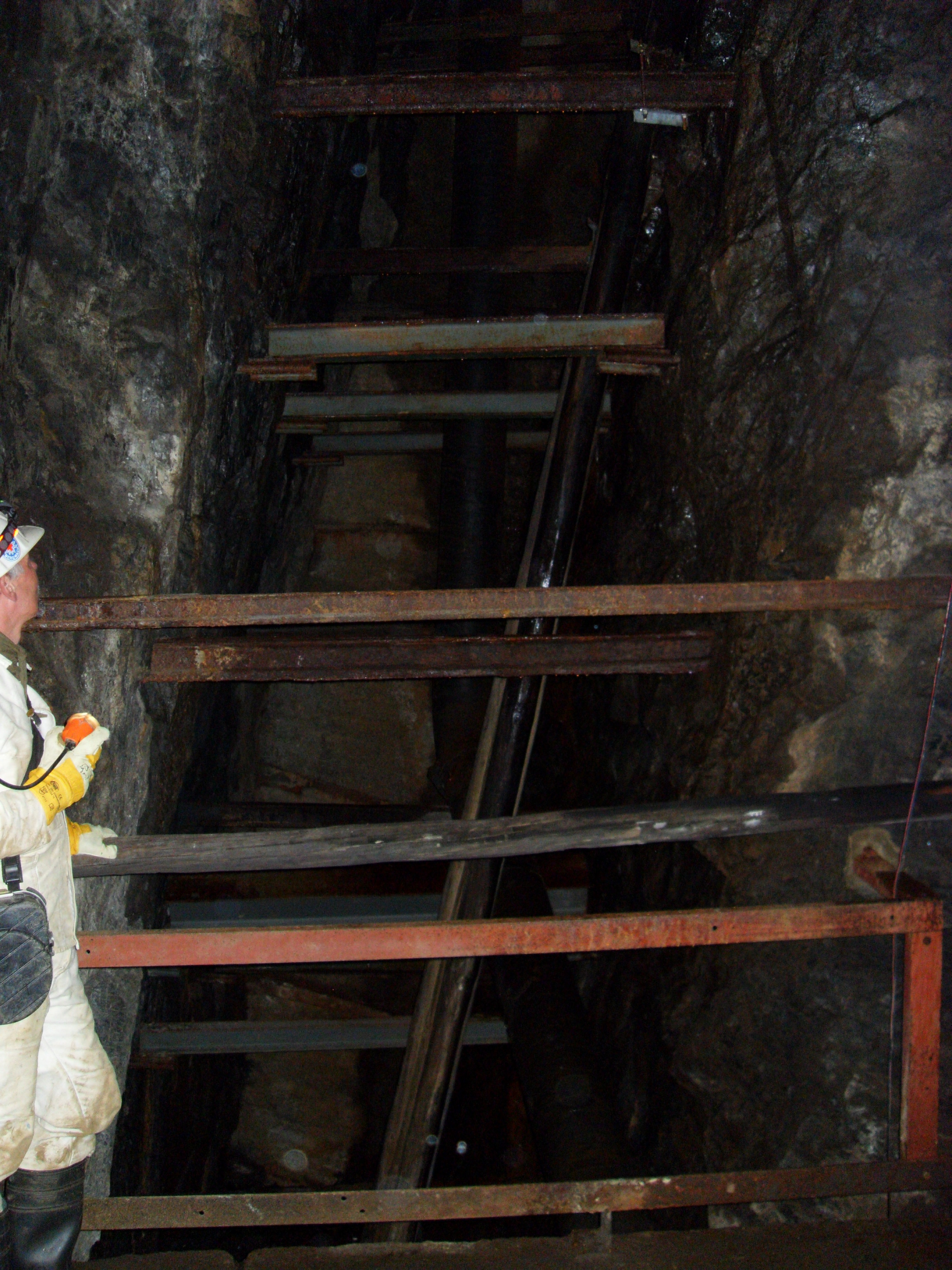
View of the inclined shaft tower in the Samson shaft at the level of the Grüner Hirsch Gallery

When it was a working mine the Samson Pit was, for a long time, the deepest in the world. Mining in Sankt Andreasberg began before 1487. The precise date when the Samson Pit first opened cannot be determined due to a lack of primary sources, but it is estimated as the early 1520s and some secondary sources fix the opening date at 1521. The first definite record of the pit is dated 1537. The oldest mining office records referring to the Samson Pit come from the year 1661.

Mining in Sankt Andreasberg experienced its first boom during the 1560s. But times of high yield were frequently accompanied by sharp drops in output, until mining operations finally ceased. The routine problem of water shortages caused by low precipitation or frost was solved by the construction of the New Rehberg Ditch (1699 to 1703) to feed water to the wheel. From 1700 to 1730, mining in the Sankt Andreasberg area went through a second boom with silver outputs of 1,000–2,000 kg per year. On 12 December 1777 Johann Wolfgang von Goethe entered the Samson Pit as part of his first Harz visit and later noted in his diary Entered Samson in the evening, came out by God's grace. Was very dismal to me this time.

At the beginning of the 19th century, silver production almost always exceeded 2,000 kg per year, the record being 3,040 kg in 1822. But towards the end, silver production at the Samson Pit declined – in 1905 364 kg was won and in 1909 a mere 90 kg – to the point where it was no longer economic and the mine finally closed in 1910. The last shift of 80 miners left the pit on 31 March 1910. The mine had 42 galleries and a total depth of about 840 m.

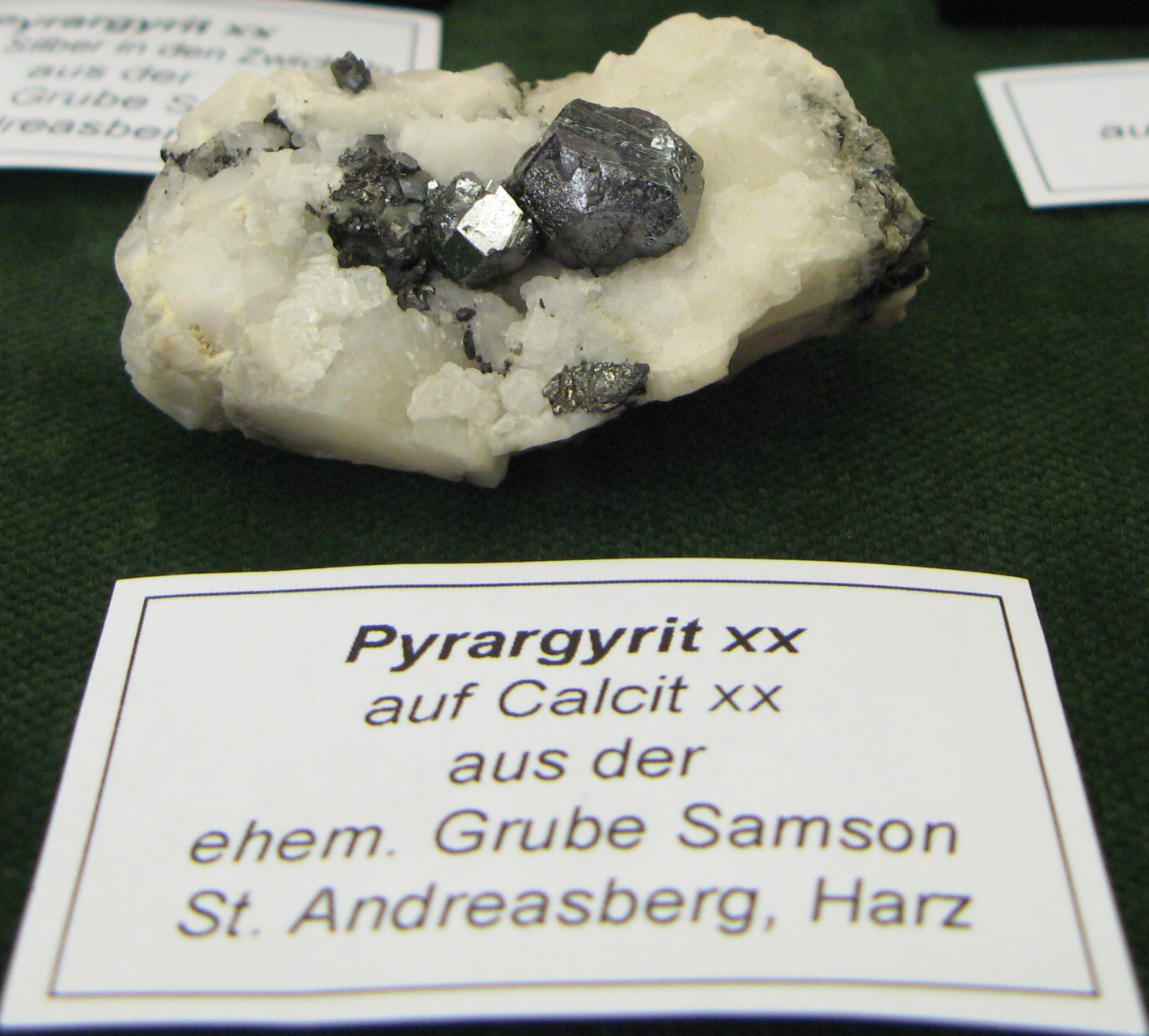
Pyrargyrite from the Samson mine

The mine was famous in the 18th century for its finds of rare and exotic minerals, which were sold inter alia through a mineral depot in Clausthal. Especially sought after were the silver minerals pyrargyrite (dark red silver ore), dyscrasite (silver antimony) and pyrostilpnite (Feuerblende), the calcite crystals in various forms (paper spar – Papierspat, leaf spar – Blätterspat, cannon spar – Kanonenspat, cube spar – Würfelspat, composite spar – Compositenspat), analcime crystals (Andreasberger Tautropfen), pink apophyllite, scherbenkobalt (native arsenic), ganomatite (Gänsekötigerz) breithauptite, native antimony, chlorargyrite (Buttermilcherz) and others. The very rare mineral samsonite was named after the pit.

== Museums ==
In 1950 the Samson Pit Mining Museum opened and, since 2001, the Harzer Roller Canary Museum has been located in the horse gin (Gaipel) at the pithead.

== Monument status ==
In 1987 the American Society of Mechanical Engineers placed the Samson Pit on the list of internationally historic engineering monuments.

== Electricity generation ==
In the shaft of the Samson Pit today there are several turbines belonging to firm of Harz Energie (Osterode), which convert the water power of the Oderteich reservoir into electrical energy. They supply the bulk of the electrical power needed by the mining town. At a depth of 130 m is the Grüner Hirsch Power Station (installed in 1922), whose water is channelled by the 1.4 km long Grünhirscher Tunnel (total length 10.2 km) to the River Sperrlutter. The Sieberstollen Power Station lies at a depth of 190 m and is drained by the 3.1 km long Sieber Adit (total length 13.1 km) into the Sieber.

== See also ==
- List of mines in the Harz

== Sources ==
- Joachim Dietrichs (2001), St. Andreasberger Verein für Geschichte und Altertumskunde e. V. (ed.), "50 Jahre Bergwerksmuseum Grube Samson", Beiträge zur Bergbaugeschichte von St. Andreasberg (in German), vol. Band 2, St. Andreasberg
- Jochen Klähn (1985), Historisches Silber-Erzbergwerk "Grube Samson" Sankt Andreasberg im Oberharz (in German), Sankt Andreasberg: Bergwerksmuseum Grube Samson, OCLC 907620331
- Ließmann (2001), St. Andreasberger Verein für Geschichte und Altertumskunde e. V. (ed.), "Betriebsgeschichte der Grube Samson", Beiträge zur Bergbaugeschichte von St. Andreasberg (in German), vol. Band 2, St. Andreasberg, pp. 29–78
- Lieber, W. and Leyerzapf, H. (1986): German Silver. An Historical Perspective on Silver Mining in Germany, Mineralogical Record, 17: 3–18.
