= Sperrlutter =

River in Germany

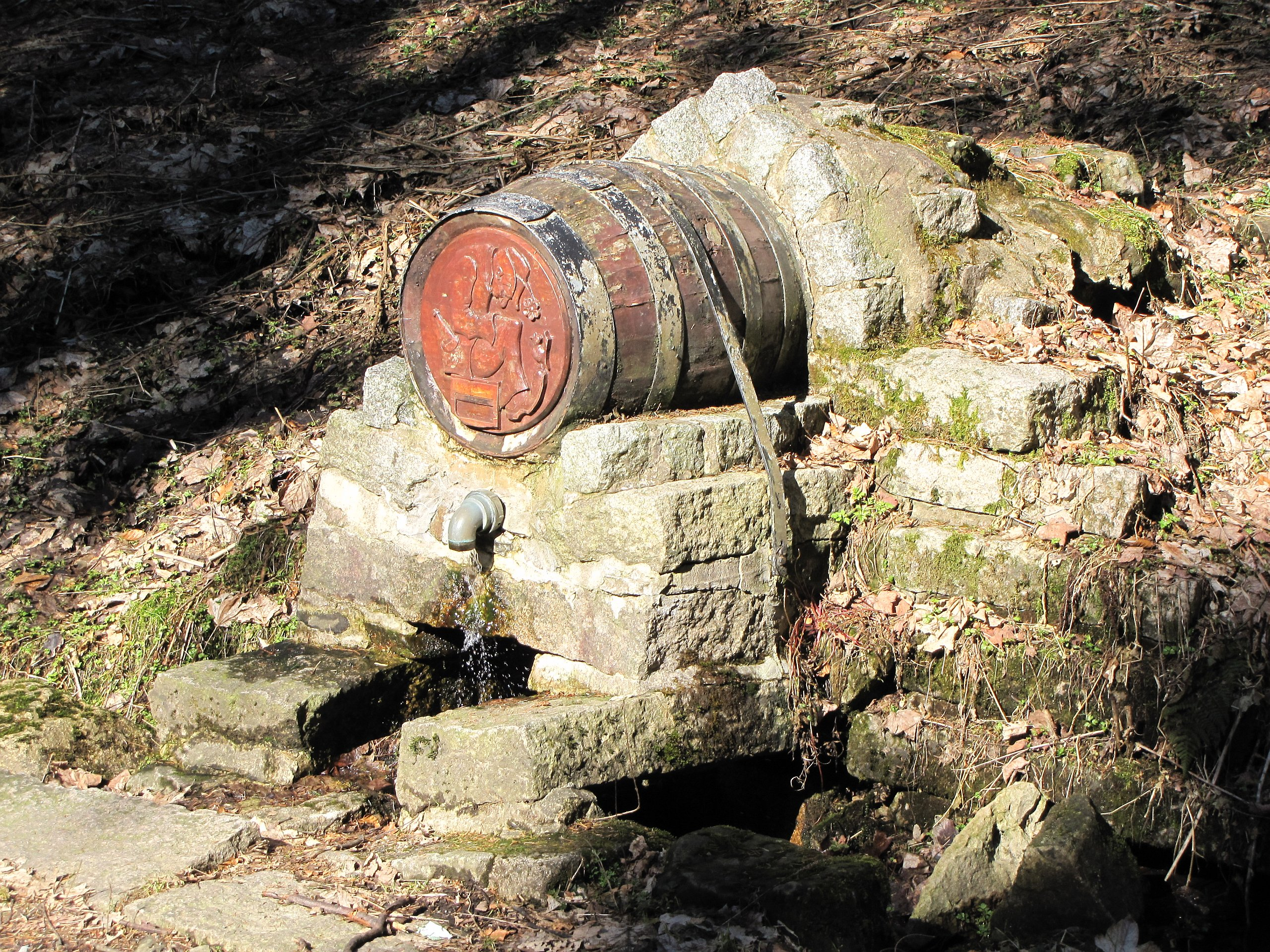

Location
- Country: Germany
- State: Lower Saxony
- Location: Harz

Physical characteristics
- Source
  - elevation: over 700 m above sea level
- Mouth
  - location: Oder
  - coordinates: 51°38′36″N 10°29′27″E
  - elevation: 309 m above sea level
- Length: 11.8 km (7.3 mi)

Basin features
- River system: Oder→ Rhume→ Leine→ Aller→ Weser→ North Sea
- Landmarks: Small towns: Bad Lauterberg im Harz; Villages: St. Andreasberg
- Tributaries
  - right: Wäschegrund, Warmeloch and Breitenbeek

The Sperrlutter is a river in Lower Saxony, Germany, a roughly 12 km (7 mi)-long tributary of the Oder between Sankt Andreasberg and Bad Lauterberg in the Harz Mountains.

The Sperrlutter rises at about 700 metres (2,300 ft) in the vicinity of the Glückaufklippen. It flows initially south through the village of Silberhütte, where it is joined by the Wäschegrund. Then, it is joined by the Breitenbeek, the largest tributary of the Sperrlutter. Finally, the Sperrlutter reaches Bad Lauterberg and enters the Oder at a height of 309 metres (1,014 ft).

== See also ==
- List of rivers of Lower Saxony
