= Wäschegrund =

River in Germany

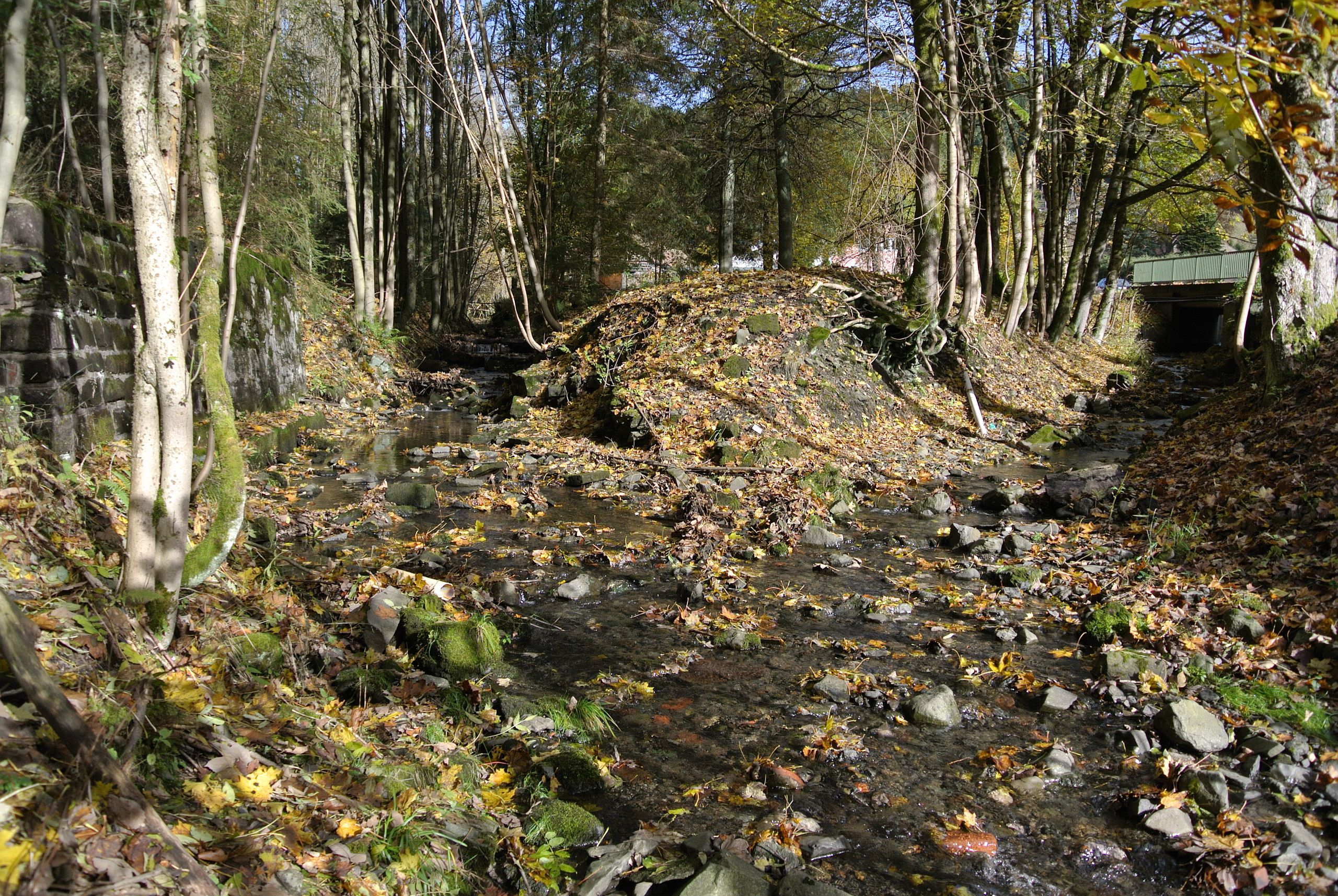
- Confluence of Wäschegrund (right) and Sperrlutter (left) in Silberhütte

Location
- Country: Germany
- State: Lower Saxony
- Location: near Sankt Andreasberg in Goslar district

Physical characteristics
- Source
  - elevation: 660 m
- Mouth
  - location: Sperrlutter
  - coordinates: 51°41′40″N 10°30′08″E
  - elevation: under 440 m
- Length: over 3 km (1.9 mi)

Basin features
- Progression: Sperrlutter→ Oder→ Rhume→ Leine→ Aller→ Weser→ North Sea
- Landmarks: Villages: St. Andreasberg
- Tributaries
  - left: Köhlergrund

The Wäschegrund is a river in Lower Saxony, Germany.

The Wäschegrund is a roughly 3.3 kilometres (2.1 mi) long and a tributary of the Sperrlutter near the mining town of Sankt Andreasberg in Goslar district. It rises at 660 metres in the vicinity of the Landesstraße 519 to Oderhaus, a district of Braunlage. It then flows in a south-southwesterly direction before joining the Sperrlutter in Silberhütte.

== See also ==
- List of rivers of Lower Saxony
