= The Land of Bad Fantasy =

2006 children's novel by K. J. Taylor

- The Land of Bad Fantasy
- Author: K.J. Taylor
- Language: English
- Genre: Children's fantasy
- Publisher: Omnibus Press, Scholastic Corporation
- Publication date: February 2006
- Publication place: Australia
- Media type: Print
- Pages: 216
- ISBN: 978-1-86291-642-5
- OCLC: 156735194

The Land of Bad Fantasy is a children's fantasy novel written by K. J. Taylor which parodies the fantasy genre in general.

== Plot synopsis ==
It tells the story of Ana Beachcombe, a resident of the "Crossroads" universe, the nexus point where all universes meet. Ana finds a magic transport medallion in her bedroom; its use sends her on a journey to "Syndup: the Land of Bad Fantasy."

She befriends a strange group of fantasy characters, among them an allergic (to humans) troll named Egbert, a lycanthrope who turns into a canary (werecanary) called Clemence and a monster frightened of anything and everything called Foskett.

Her group of unlikely characters set off on a journey to the city of Laundromatt, where they hope to meet the king and petition for equal rights.

The Land of Bad Fantasy was published in Australia by Omnibus Press in 2006 and by Scholastic Corporation in 2007.

== Critical reception ==
Aussiereviews.com called the main character, Ana, "wryly cynical" and proclaims the book "easy to read".
