= Wild canary =

Wild canary can refer to:

- The Atlantic canary (Serinus canaria), from which domestic canaries are descended
- Another name for the American goldfinch (Carduelis tristis)
