= Breitenbeek =

River in Germany

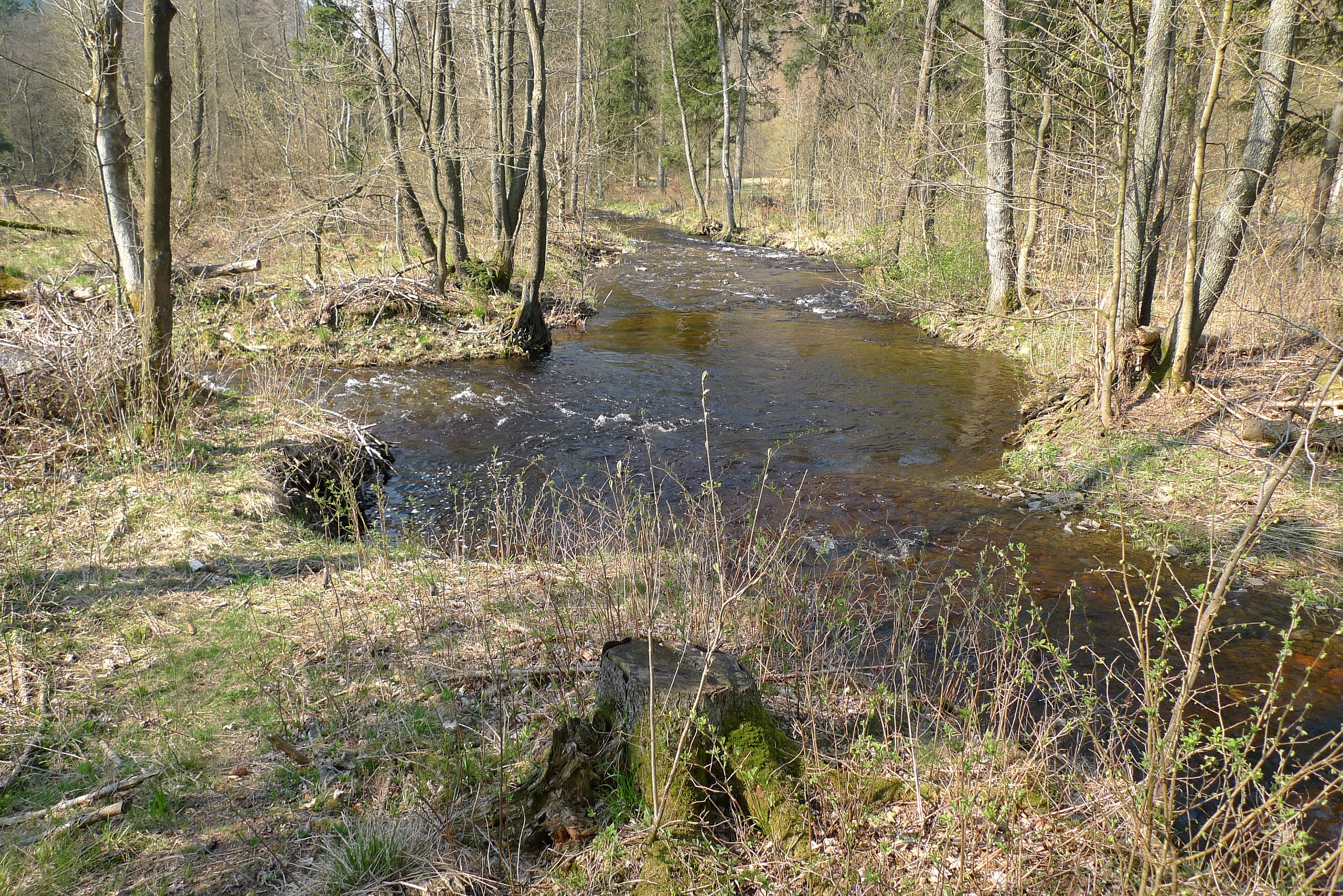
- Confluence of the Breitenbeek (l) with the Sperrlutter

Location
- Country: Germany
- State: Lower Saxony
- Location: between Sankt Andreasberg and Bad Lauterberg in the Harz Mountains

Physical characteristics
- Source
  - elevation: over 620 m
- Mouth
  - location: Sperrlutter
  - coordinates: 51°39′45″N 10°30′23″E
  - elevation: 360 m
- Length: over 6 km (3.7 mi)

Basin features
- River system: Sperrlutter→ Oder→ Rhume→ Leine→ Aller→ Weser→ North Sea
- Waterbodies: Reservoirs: Engelsburger Teiche

The Breitenbeek is a roughly 6.3 km (4 mi) river of Lower Saxony, in the Harz Mountains of central Germany. It is a tributary of the Sperrlutter. It rises at over 620 m in the vicinity of the Rehbergklinik in Oderberg (a part of Sankt Andreasberg). It then flows initially southwards through the Engelsburger Teiche, before it joins the Sperrlutter at 360 m. The Breitenbeek is the largest tributary of the Sperrlutter.

== Gallery ==
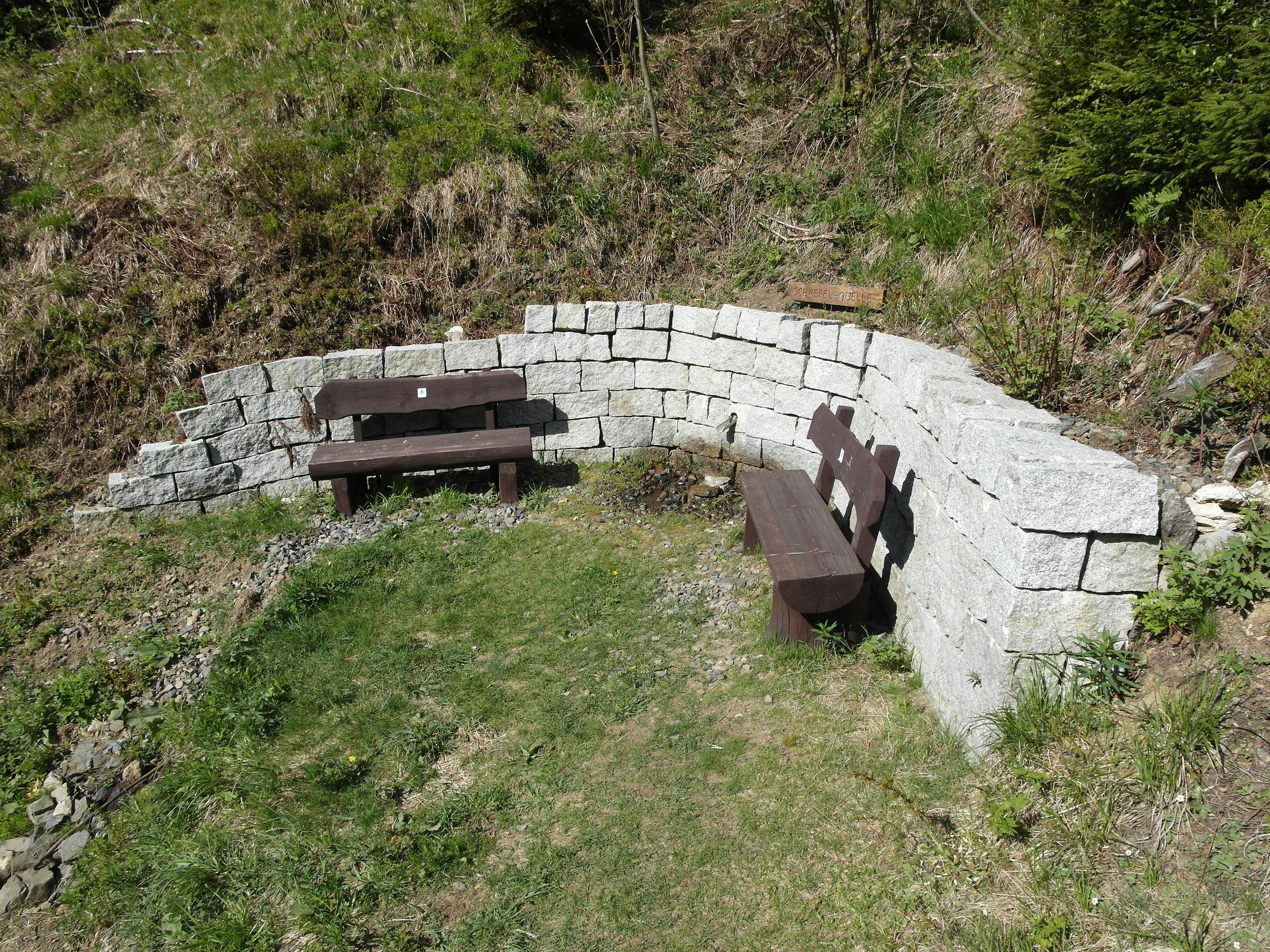
The sulphur spring is the best known spring of the Breitenbeek

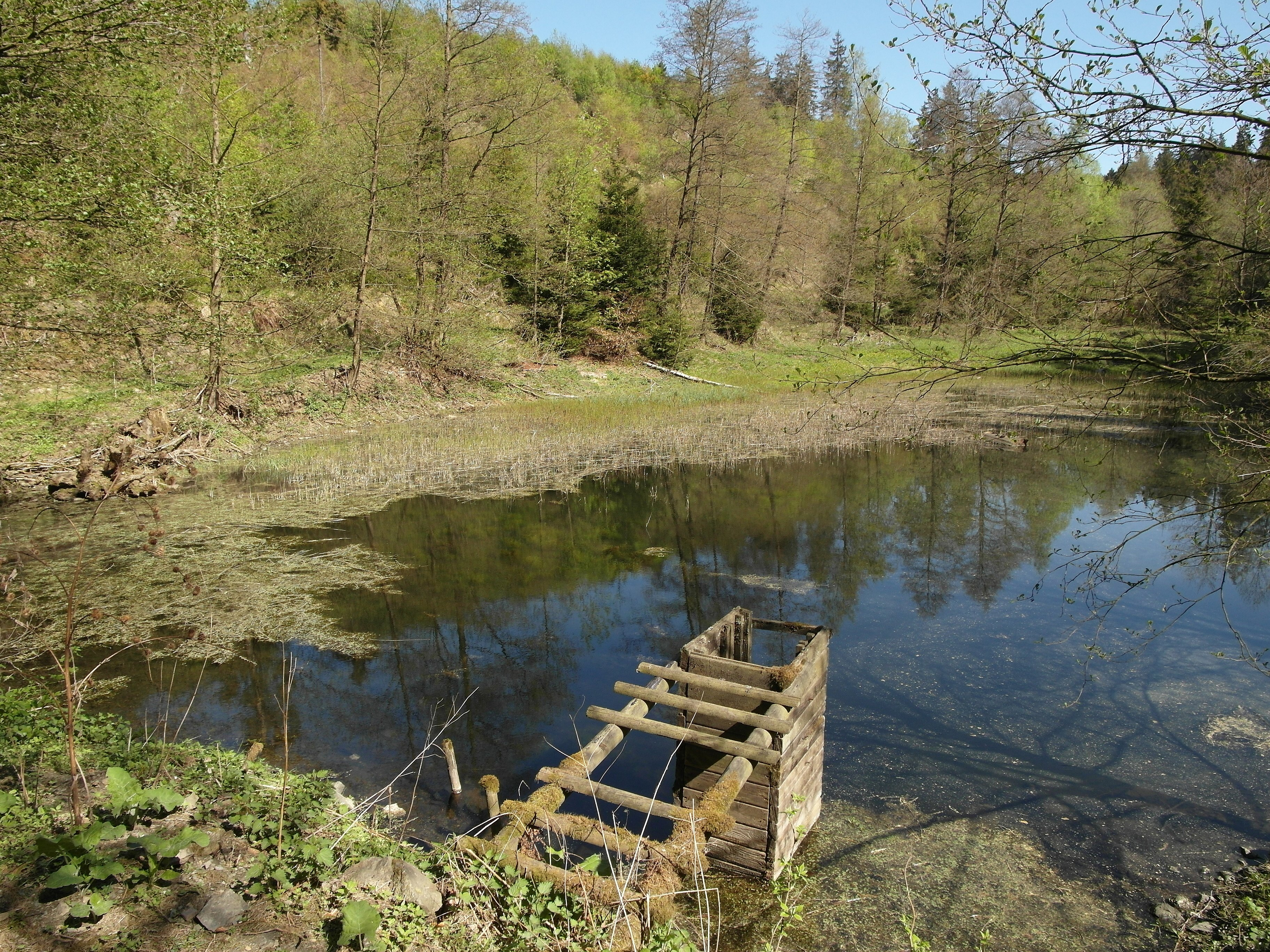
At the end of the source region are the two Engelsburg ponds

== See also ==
- List of rivers of Lower Saxony
