= Red factor canary =

Breed of domestic canary

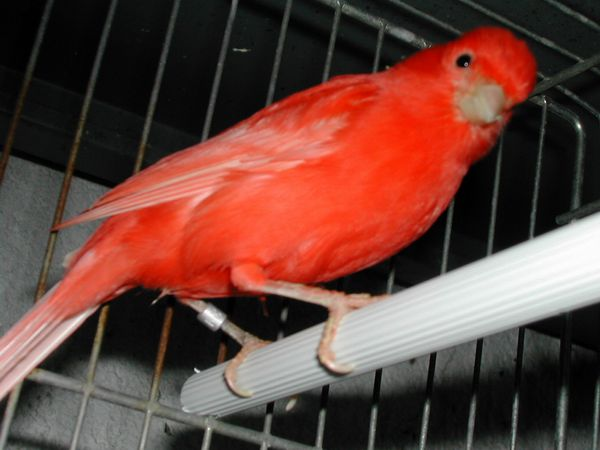
A female red factor canary

The red factor canary is a breed and variety of domestic canary, named after its colorful plumage. It is a bird commonly kept as a pet and for showing.

== Description ==
The red factor canary averages about 5 1/2 inches (14 cm) in length. This variety of canary tends to be bred for the novelty of its color, rather than for its song.

It was developed as a cross between another type of finch — the now-endangered Venezuelan red siskin (Spinus cucullatus) — and a yellow domestic canary (Serinus canaria domestica).

In breeding/showing, domestic canaries are broken down into two types based on pigmentation: melanics and lipochromes. Melanics contain melanin markings over top of lipochromes in their feathers, while lipochrome canaries have feathers that contain no melanin in their pigmentation. The red factor canary is classified as a lipochrome.

There are two types of red factor canaries based on the lipochrome distribution in their plumage: intensive red factors and non-intensive red factors. Intensive red factors are characterized by even lipochrome distribution throughout their feathers, giving the plumage a bright and uniform appearance throughout. Birds with non-intensive coloration have feathers that lack pigmentation at the tips — referred to as frosting due to the appearance — this makes for a more subdued brightness in appearance than birds with intensive coloration.

== Availability ==
Red factor canaries are usually available at most pet stores and can also be found through bird shows, bird clubs, breeders and on the internet.

== See also ==
- Atlantic canary (wild canary)
- Australian plainhead
- Bird hybrid
- Harz Roller
