= Australian plainhead =

Breed of domestic canary

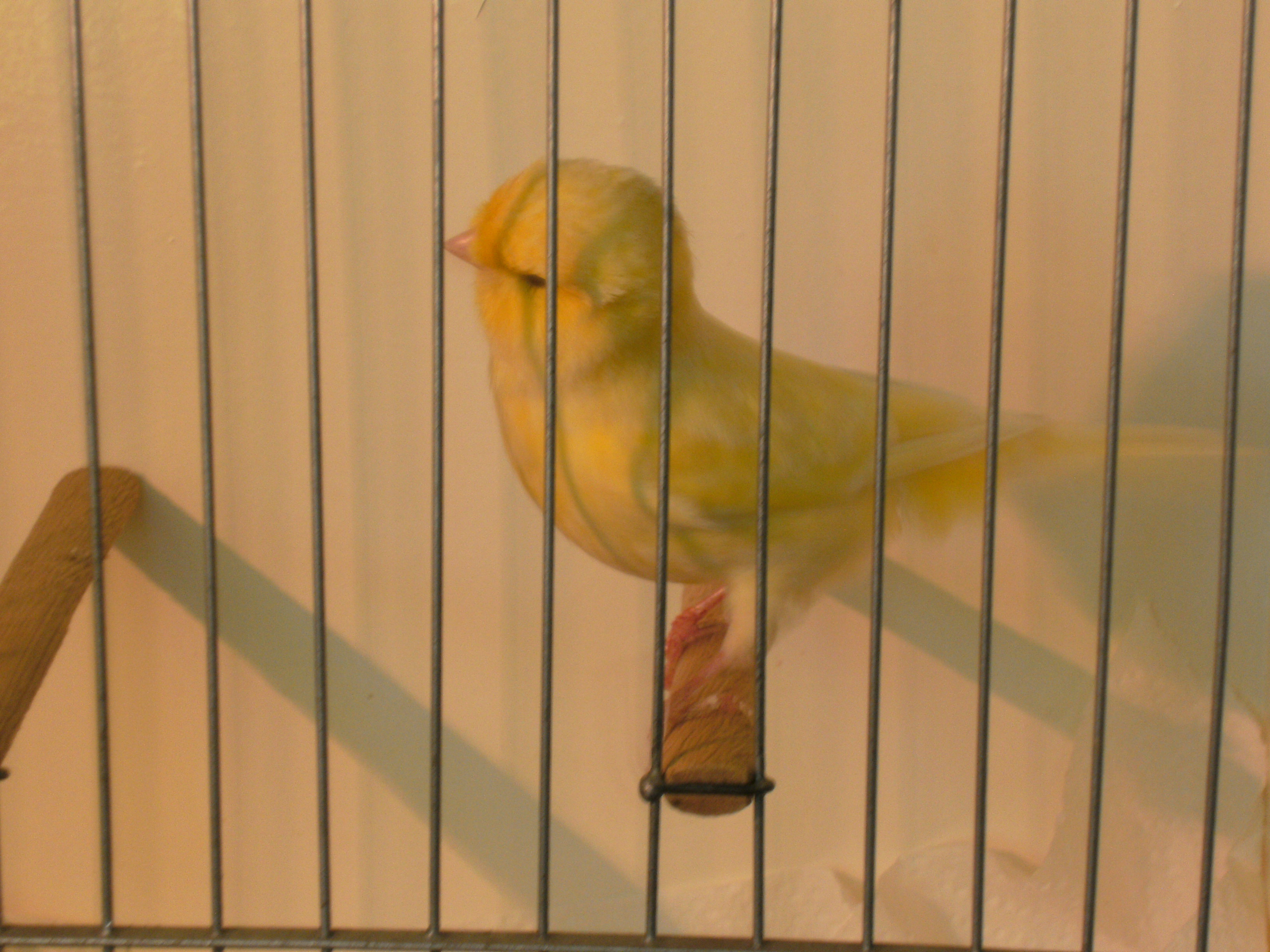
A clear buff Australian plainhead

The Australian plainhead is a breed of domestic canary that was created for show purposes. The variety was developed through selective breeding and remains the only breed of canary created in Australia.

== History ==
The Australian plainhead has its roots in the old style Norwich canaries that originated in Norwich, England and became a popular show variety in Australia. In the 1930s, differences between the older show standard used by the breeders of Victoria, Australia and the more modern standards of the UK, created a bitter divide amongst Australian breeders of the Norwich canary. Decades later, after the modern Norwich had largely displaced the old-style birds from the Victorian show scene, a club was started in 1953 to preserve the old breed which was renamed the Australian plainhead. By 1991, the number of Australian plainhead canaries in Australia had dropped to around 460 birds. Whilst the Australian plainhead remains a rare breed, it is now far more widespread with birds being bred throughout Australia and in the US.

== Showing ==
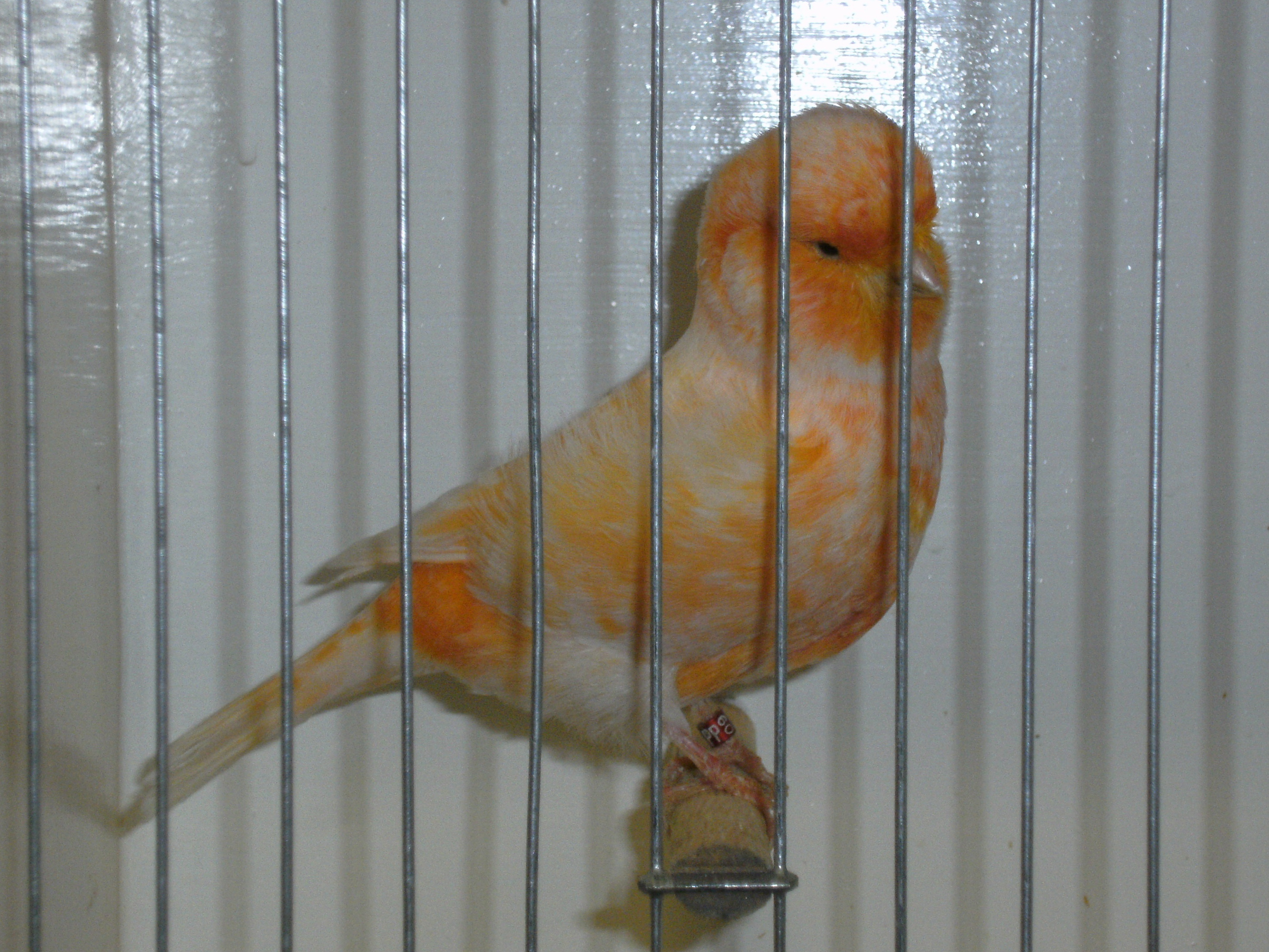
A colour-fed clear buff Australian plainhead

The Australian plainhead is a "type canary", which is mainly judged for its shape (referred to as type). Despite this, the breed is also noted for its colour and feather quality. Australian plainhead may be green, blue (grey), yellow, white, cinnamon, fawn and variegated. Show birds may be "colour-fed" carotenoids during molting which gives new feathers an orange hue, but this is optional. The birds are shown in a box style show cage with a white interior.

== Breeding ==
Australian plainheads typically breed well with basic care and attention. While many other large canary breeds require foster pairs to rear their offspring, Australian plainheads are good feeders and usually rear their own young.

== See also ==
- Atlantic canary (wild canary)
- Domestic canary
- Harz Roller, another breed
- Red factor canary, another breed
