= Wilhelm Trute =

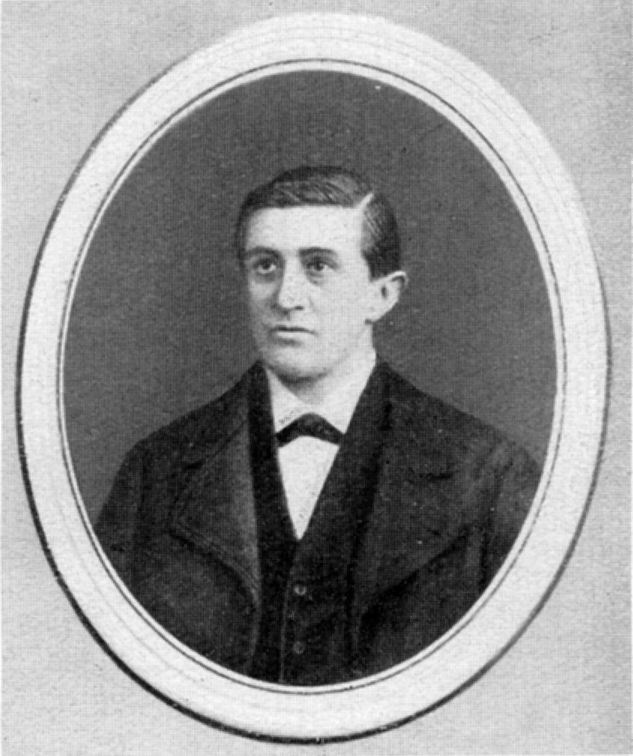
Portrait of Wilhelm Trute

Heinrich Friedrich Trute called Wilhelm Trute (German pronunciation: [ˈvɪlhɛlm ˈtʁuːtə]; March 5, 1836 – October 20, 1889) was a German miner and breeder of singing canaries, the Harz Roller.

== Biography ==
Wilhelm Trute was born in 1836 in Sankt Andreasberg as the only child of Georg Conrad Trute and Johanna Henriette Trute (birth name Keitel). Not much is known about Trutes childhood and youth. It is very likely that he attended school in Sankt Andreasberg and worked in the local mineral processing unit as a teenager to supplement his family's income.

He followed his father's footsteps and became a miner. He first got a job in Clausthal and later on in the Samson Pit in Sankt Andreasberg.

He married Henriette Minna Charlotte Gödecke with whom he had one child, Carl Trute.

While working as a miner, he pursued his passion for breeding of canaries, but rheumatism and, from 1889, gastric trouble which later turned out to be stomach cancer chained him to his bed. After a long period of suffering, he died on 20 October 1889 at 12:45 AM.

== Canary Breeding ==
Wilhelm Trute's ancestors reached the Harz in the 15th century from the Ore Mountains, making his family one of the oldest in Sankt Andreasberg. It is not known when his ancestors began to bred canaries but, like others, his father Andreasberg already bred a race of canaries from the mainland called Japper.

Around 1865, Wilhelm Trute got a pair of singing canaries from the silver works supervisor Wilhelm Weiland, a relative. It is probable that the first Harz Rollers emerged from this crossbreed. These Rollers from the Trute branch had, other than later Harz Rollers, grey to grey-green feathering and excelled by their distinctive song. Those birds brought wide fame to the breeder and his hometown.

In distinction to other breeders, Trute used only birds from this one branch. He also did not sell his birds by mail. Whoever wanted to acquire one of his Rollers had to come to his home in Sankt Andreasberg.

He bred canaries from the Trute branch in his home until his disease chained him to his bed in 1889.

== Honors ==
To honor his achievement in canary breeding he was dedicated an outsized, stylised Harzbauer in a ceremonial service on 2 May 1999. To point out the special relationship between mining and canary breeding a vessel for ore processing was mounted in the cage as a symbolised drinking bowl. In 2001 the memorial was complemented with a Dennert Fir Tree which describes the breeders deeds. Another Dennert Fir Tree was erected in front of his former house.

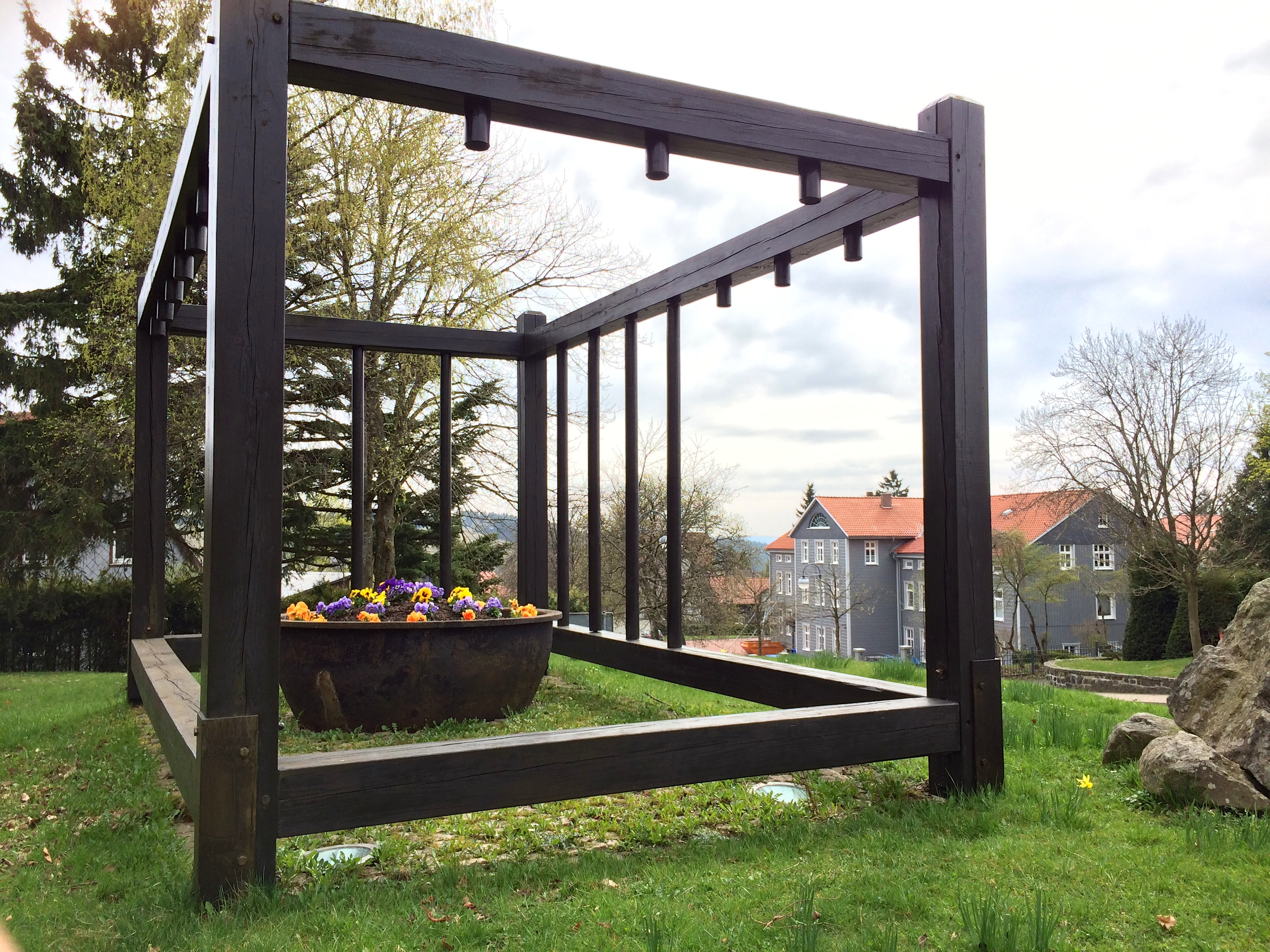
Wilhelm Trute Memorial in Sankt Andreasberg

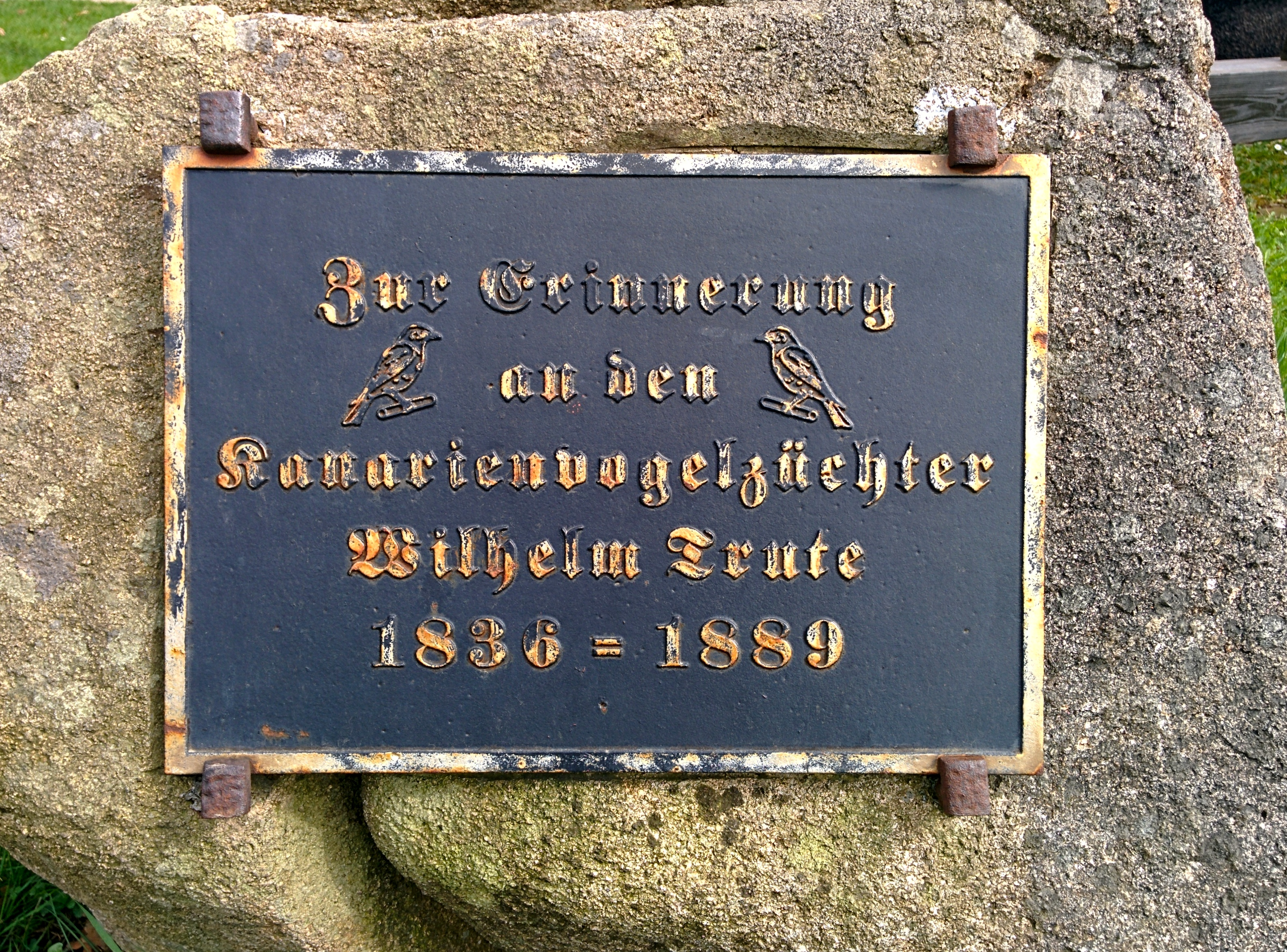
Plate at the memorial

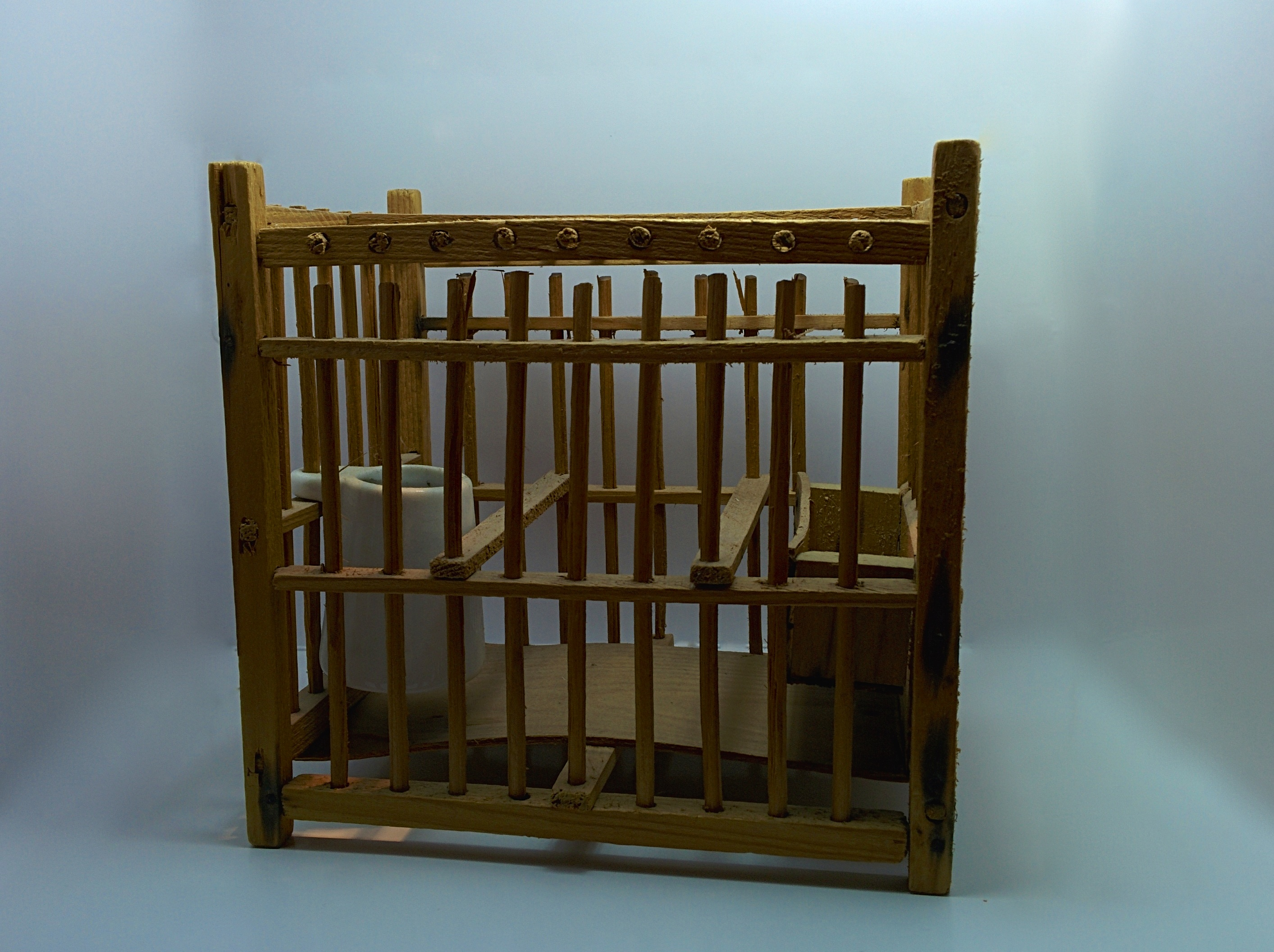
Transport cage for canaries as it was used in the 18th and 19th century for the delivery of Harz Rollers

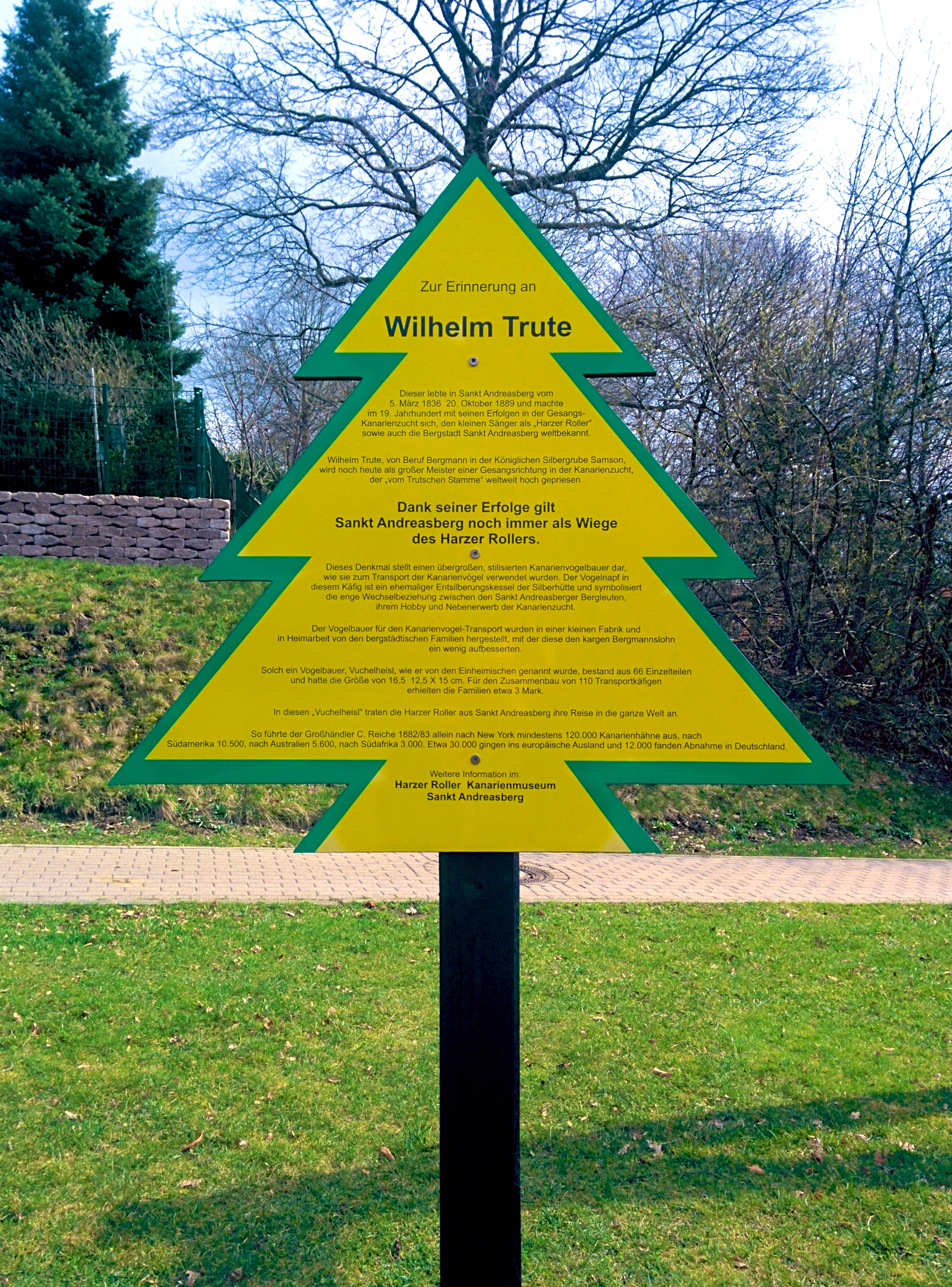
Dennert Fir Tree at the Wilhelm Trute Memorial

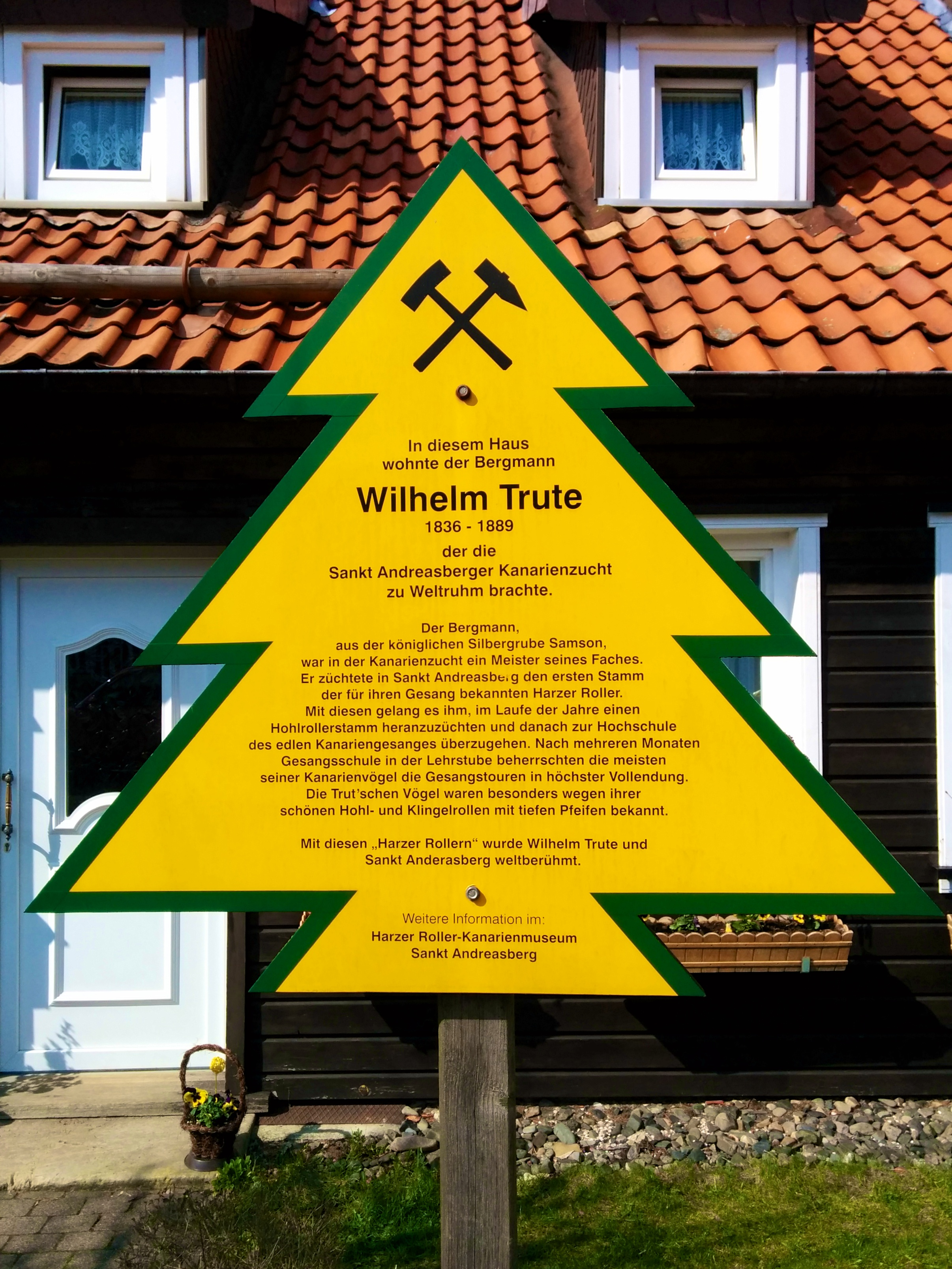
Dennert Fir Tree at Trute's former home

The local association for the care of the cemetery of Sankt Andreasbrg in cooperation with the Samson Pit Museum reerected Trute's grave on its former location. To underline his achievements in canary breeding a small silvery canary was added to his gravestone. Since then, the grave has been maintained by the association.

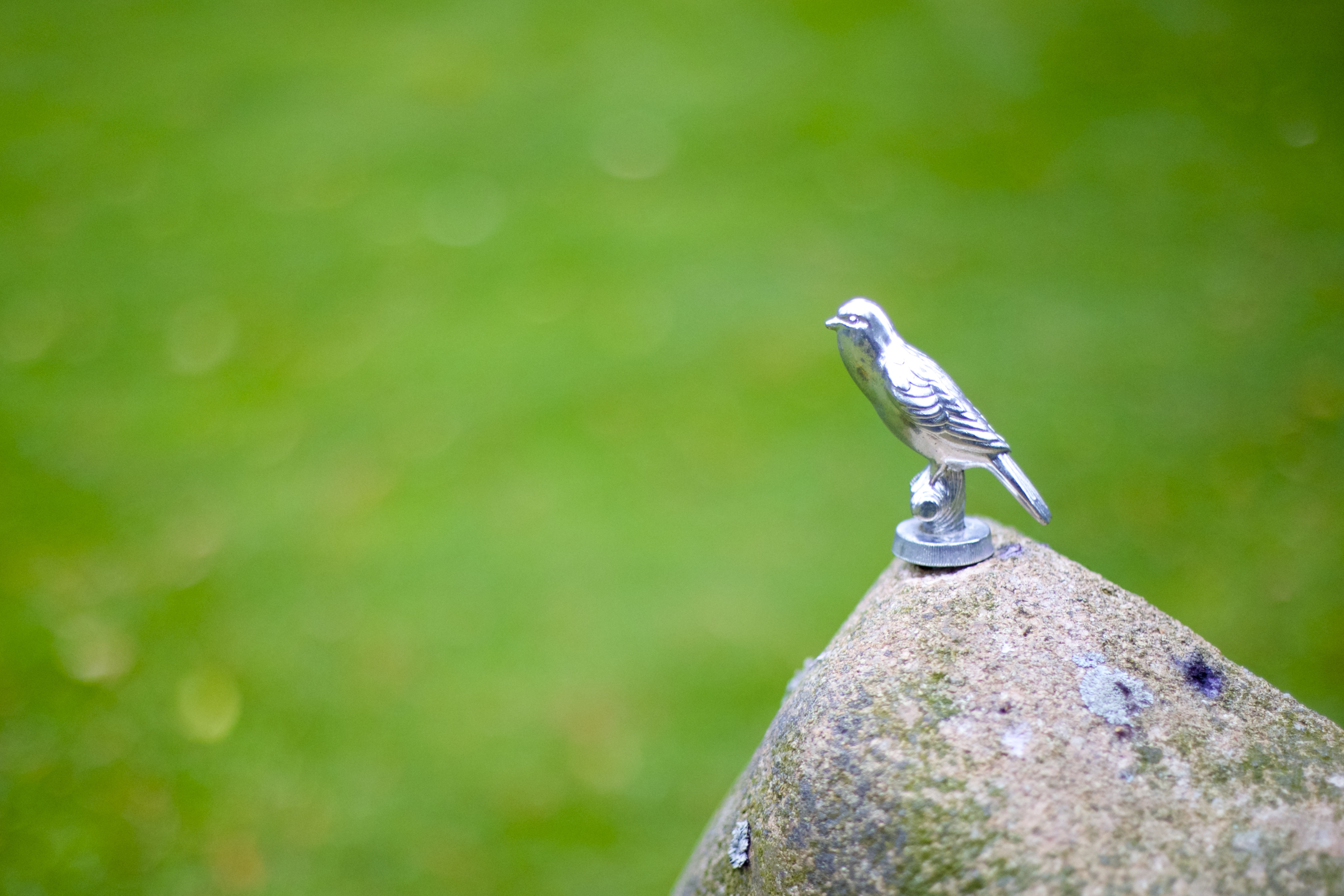
Harz Roller on Wilhelm Trutes Gravestone

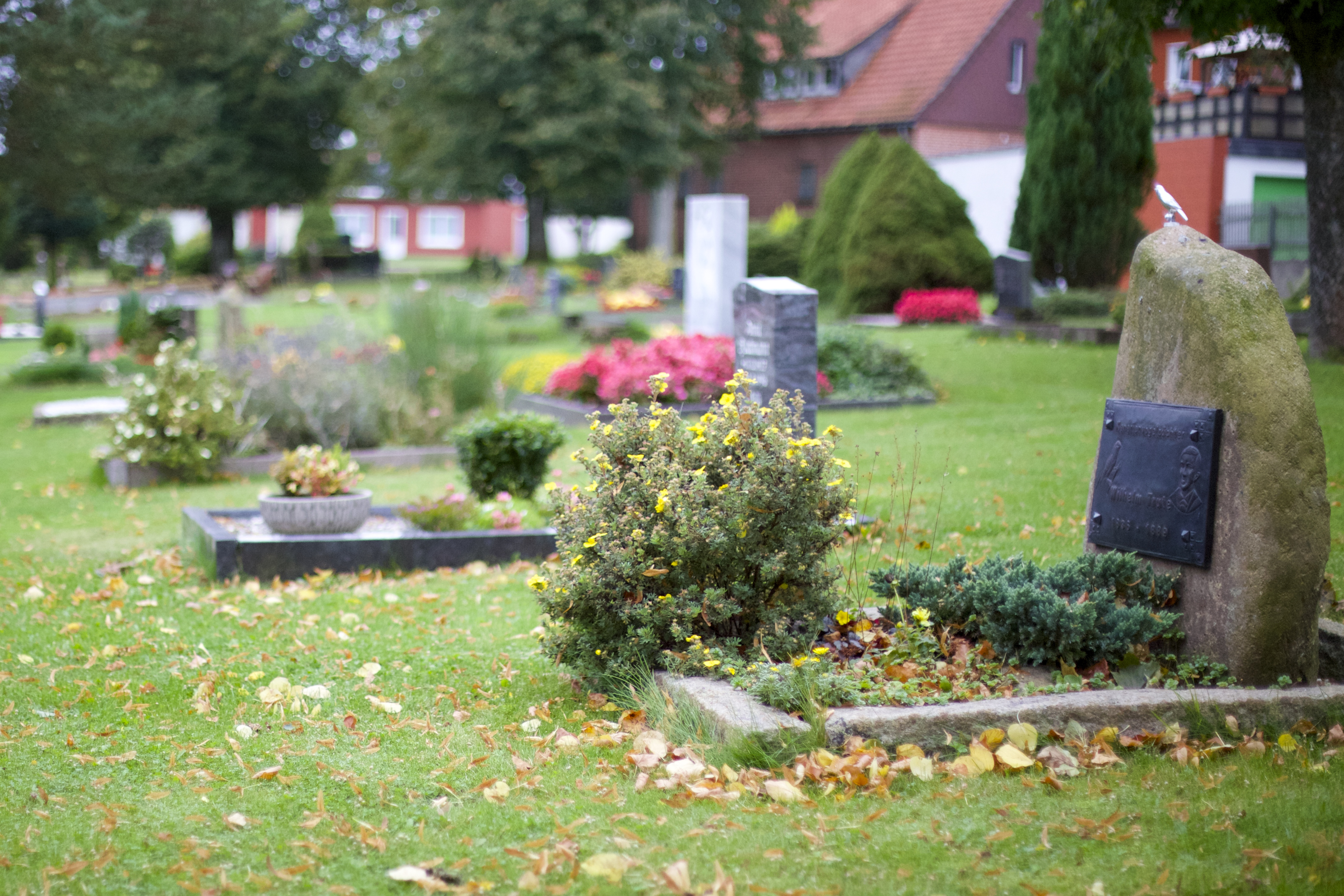
Wilhelm Trutes grave in Sankt Andreasberg

== See also ==
- Harzer Roller
