= Harz granite =

Type of granite found in the Harz Mountains

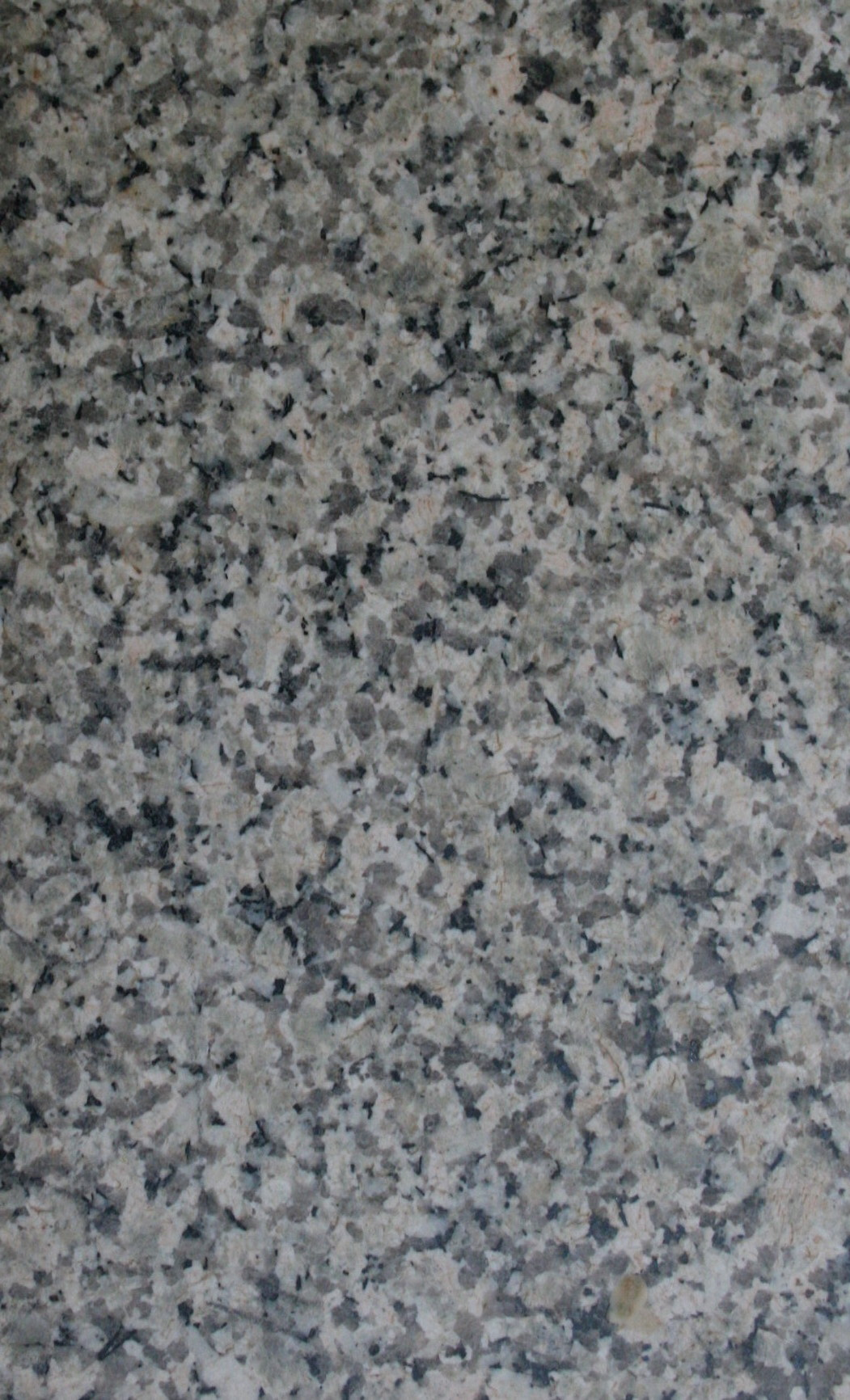
Birkenkopf granite, one of the Harz granites. Dull finish (specimen ca. 10 cm long)

Harz granite (German: Harzer Granit, pronounced [ˌhaːɐ̯tsɐ gʁaˈniːt]) is found in the Harz Mountains of central Germany. It may be divided into five types, all of which were widely used as natural stone: Knaupsholz granite, Birkenkopf granite, Wurmberg granite, Königskopf granite and Ilsestein granite. The first three granites were widely used in North Germany, Belgium and the Netherlands and, later, also in East Germany. Knaupsholz granite was "for a long time one of the most important types of cut stone in the former GDR".

In 2009 only Knaupsholz granite was still being quarried.

== Geology ==
The granitic plutons of the Harz Mountains - the Brocken, Ramberg and Oker plutons - were formed at the end of the Harz mountain building period (the Hercynian orogeny) during the Late Carboniferous about 300 million years ago. These natural stones were formed when large magma intrusions in the Brocken granite massif solidified at different cooling and crystallization rates into several differently coloured granites. The Harz granites are part of the Brocken granite complex, which is the largest granite complex in the Harz with an area of 165 square kilometres (64 sq mi). The Harzburg gabbro-norite intrusion forms part of this complex, but has a primary chemistry similar to an island-arc tholeiite, although it shows the effects of large scale assimilation of crustal rocks.

== Quarries ==
Among the large quarrying concerns operating before the Second World War in 1938 were the firms of Zureck in Wernigerode (100 to 110 employees), Hannoversche Basaltwerke mbH with its branch, the Wernigerode Granite Quarries (Granitsteinbrüche Wernigerode, 60 to 70 employees), and Braunlager Granit- und Schotterwerke G.m.b.H. (45 employees). There were also 5 to 7 medium and 15 to 17 small businesses with a combined total of 600 employees. Their market at that time comprised the entire territory of the German Reich, Belgium and the Netherlands.

In 1948, after the war, 30 to 40 quarrymen were working in the Braunlager Granit- und Schotterwerken as well as an unknown number in another firm in Lower Saxony. There are no exact figures for the numbers of workers in the firms of the German Democratic Republic (GDR). The Knaupsholz and Birkenkopf quarries in the GDR and the divisions of the Zureck company in Wernigerode were expropriated on 5 November 1945.

In the early 1950s, the following quarries in the Brocken granite region were listed by Sickenberg (1951): Eckerloch, Schneeloch, Gebbertsberg, Wurmberg, Haserode, Wolfklippen, Großer und Kleiner Birkenkopf, Knaupsholz, Ottofels, Neustätter Hau, Forsthaus Plessenburg and Gelochter Stein. In 1958, eight quarries were still being worked in the territory of the GDR, but only two were left in 1969 (Knaupsholz and Birkenkopf).

== Knaupsholz granite ==
=== Occurrence ===
Knaupsholz granite was quarried in the Knaupsholz forest district near the small settlements of Drei Annen Hohne and Schierke, a kilometre east of Schierke station in Saxony-Anhalt. Knaupsholz granite was one of the most important building stones in East Germany.

=== Mineral content ===
Knaupsholz granite is grey-red in colour and coarse-grained. It contains 33.5% quartz, 45.9% alkali feldspar, 15.1% plagioclase feldspar, 4.8% biotite and chlorite, 0.7% ore minerals, like magnetite, pyrite, hematite, and 0.7 others. The alkali feldspar crystals can be up to 18 mm across.

== Birkenkopf granite ==
=== Occurrence ===
Birkenkopf granite was quarried on the Großer Birkenkopf hill south of Hasselfelde. It is a medium-grained granite with blue-grey coloration. In the quarry 30 to 40% blocks of stone could be used for sawing and 50% of exploitable rock debris could be obtained. The quarry closed in 2009.

=== Mineral composition ===
Birkenkopf granite contains 31.3% quartz, 42.6% alkali feldspar, 20.4% plagioclase feldspar, 5.4% biotite and chlorite as well as 0.3% ore minerals like magnetite, pyrite and hematite.

== Wurmberg granite ==
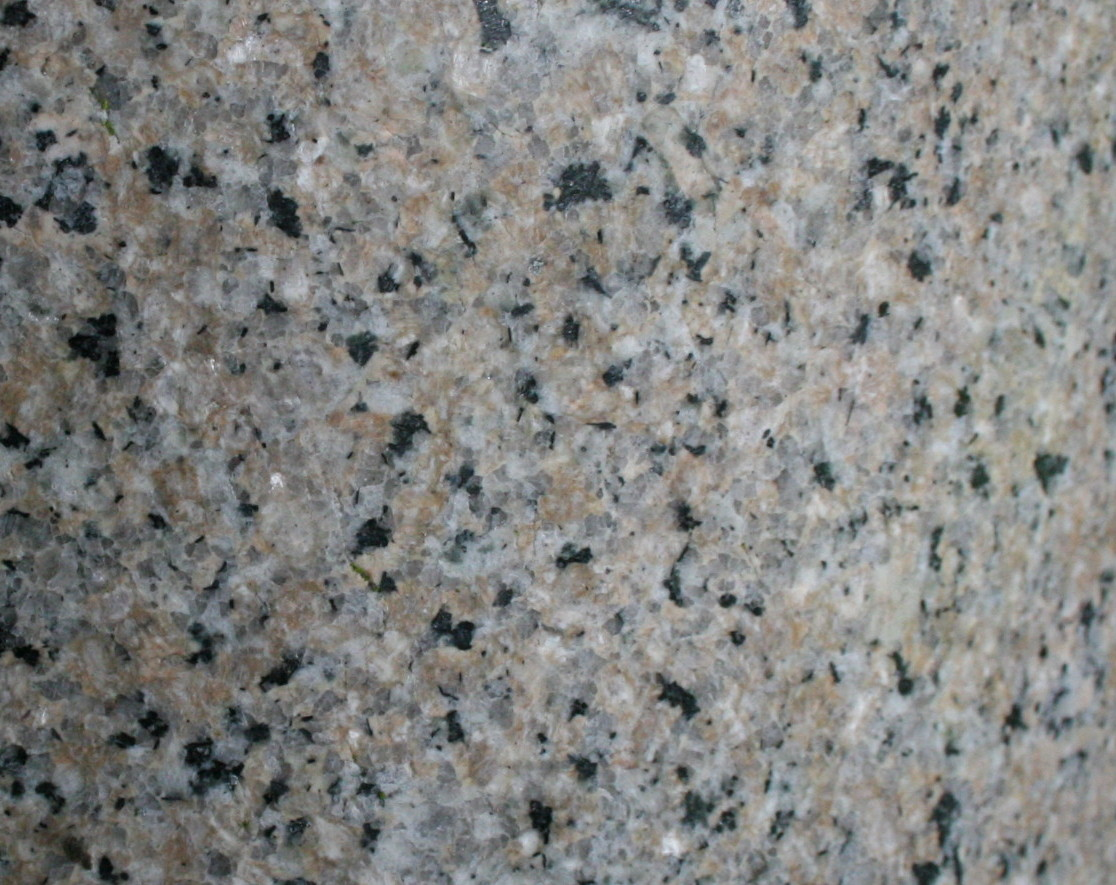
Wurmberg granite, specimen ca. 10 x 8 cm

=== Occurrence ===
The quarry for Wurmberg granite was situated about 2.5 kilometres north of Braunlage and 250 metres high on the Wurmberg mountain. The granite was pale red and fine to coarse-grained. The quarry has been closed since spring 1974.

=== Mineral composition ===
This granite contains 31% quartz, 42% alkali feldspar, 20% plagioclase feldspar, 7% biotite, as well as less than 1% of other minerals like zircon, apatite, rutile, muscovite and opaque minerals.

== Königskopf granite ==
=== Occurrence ===
Königskopf granite was extracted in a quarry near Königskrug, which closed in the 1960s. As a result of ecological restrictions it is unlikely to be reopened again. The granite is light red to intense red (flesh red) in colour.

=== Mineral composition ===
Königskopf granite contains 33% quartz, 42% orthoclase with a mineral grain size of 2 to 5 mm up to a maximum of 15 mm, 22% plagioclase feldspar, 5% biotite and 0.7% other minerals.

== Ilsestein granite ==
Ilsestein granite was quarried on the northern boundary of the Harz on the Kleiner Birkenkopf hill near Thale. It was only of local significance, because it had low hardness.

=== Geology and occurrence ===
Ilsestein granite lies on the northern perimeter of the Harz and is part of the Brocken massif. It occurs in a vein-like deposit, 11 kilometres long and 2 kilometres wide. The magma of the Ilsestein granite was probably the last magma intrusion in the Brocken complex. It is the most quartz-rich granite in the Brocken complex. Its quartz and orthoclase elements grew together. Its utility and hardness as a construction stone is reduced by the numerous geodes, up to 5 cm across.

== Use ==
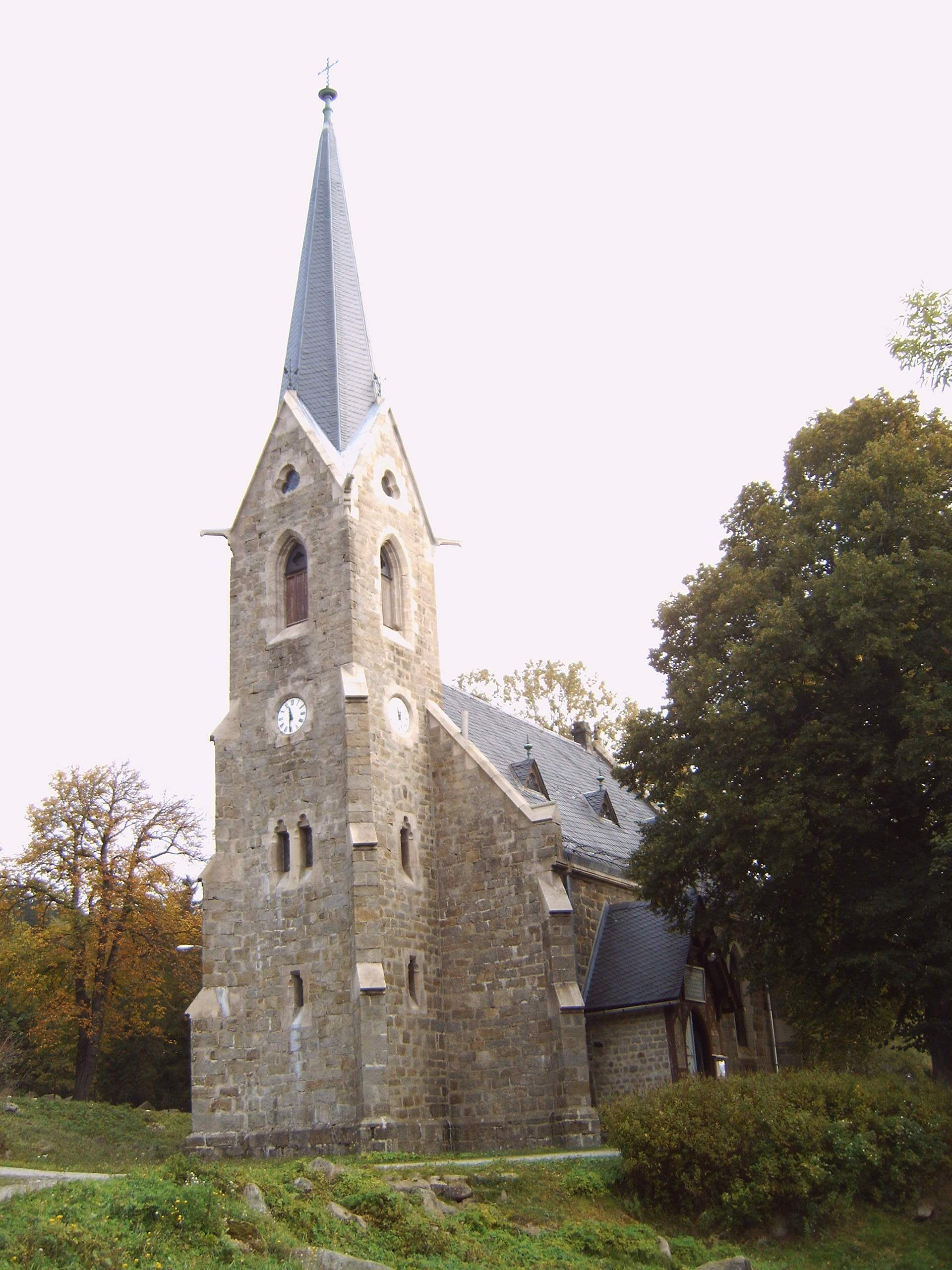
Schierke mining church

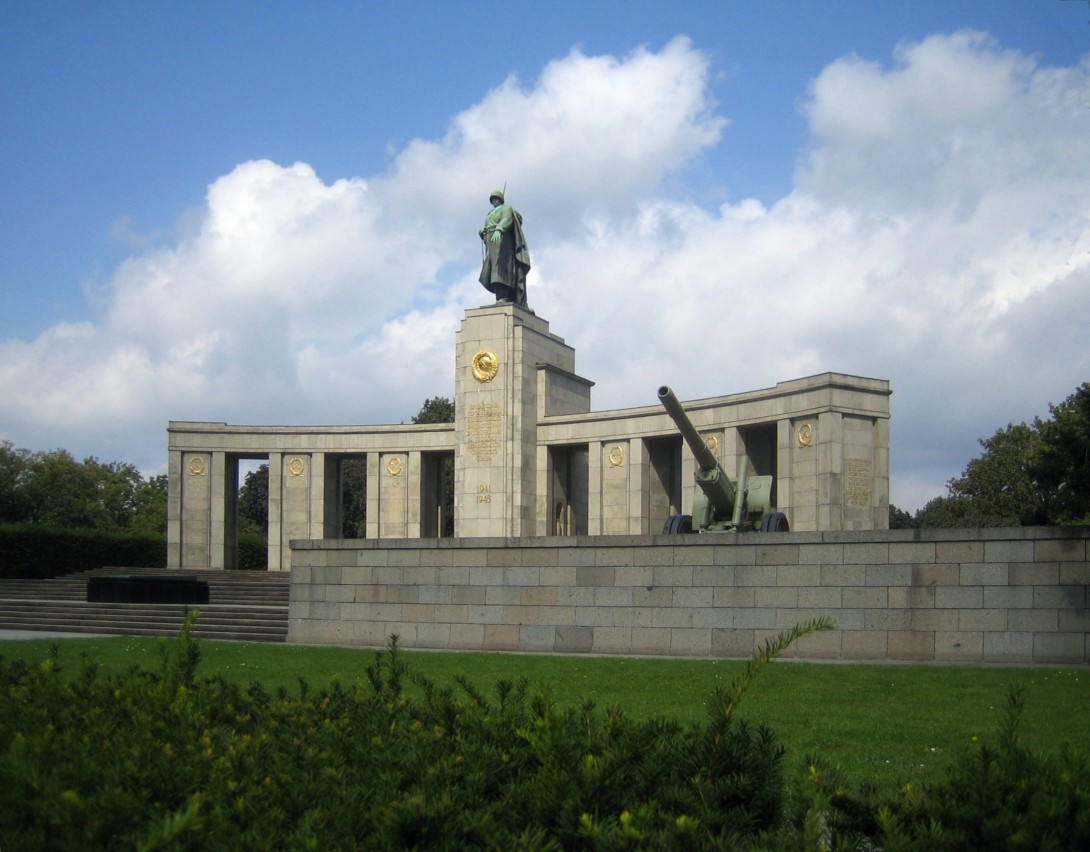
Soviet memorial in Berlin's Tiergarten made of Harz granite with a bronze statue of a soldier

Harz granites are weather-resistant, polishable and resistant to aggressive, chemical compounds. Their technical properties make them very suitable for outdoor use, but they are also used indoors due to their appearance.

These granites are used as solid building stones for bridge construction, walls, door lintels and window sills, staircase steps, flags, façades, gravestones and, as cobbles and hard core, for roads. Knaupsholz granite is used as stone chippings for trails in the Harz National Park. In 2009, the remaining quarries at Knaupsholz and Birkenkopf (now closed) were providing granite for the following purposes:

=== Technical construction ===
Road surfaces, cobbles, walls and bridges in Lower Saxony and North Germany, Magdeburg, Hamburg and Berlin; lock construction and bank reinforcement on the Mittelland and Kiel Canals.

=== Monuments and buildings ===
Harz granite has been used for monuments and memorials in Buchenwald, Ravensbrück and Sachsenhausen concentration camps; the Soviet War Memorial in Berlin's Tiergarten and the Soviet Cenotaph in Treptow; interior of the Schiller Museum in Weimar; the mining church in Schierke; the Palace of Culture of the GDR; the Deutsche Bank and town hall steps in Wernigerode.

== Sources ==
Mohr, Kurt (1933). Geologie und Mineralstätten des Harzes. p. 223 ff., 2nd edition, Schweizerbart'sche Verlagsbuchhandlung, Stuttgart, ISBN 3-510-65154-5
