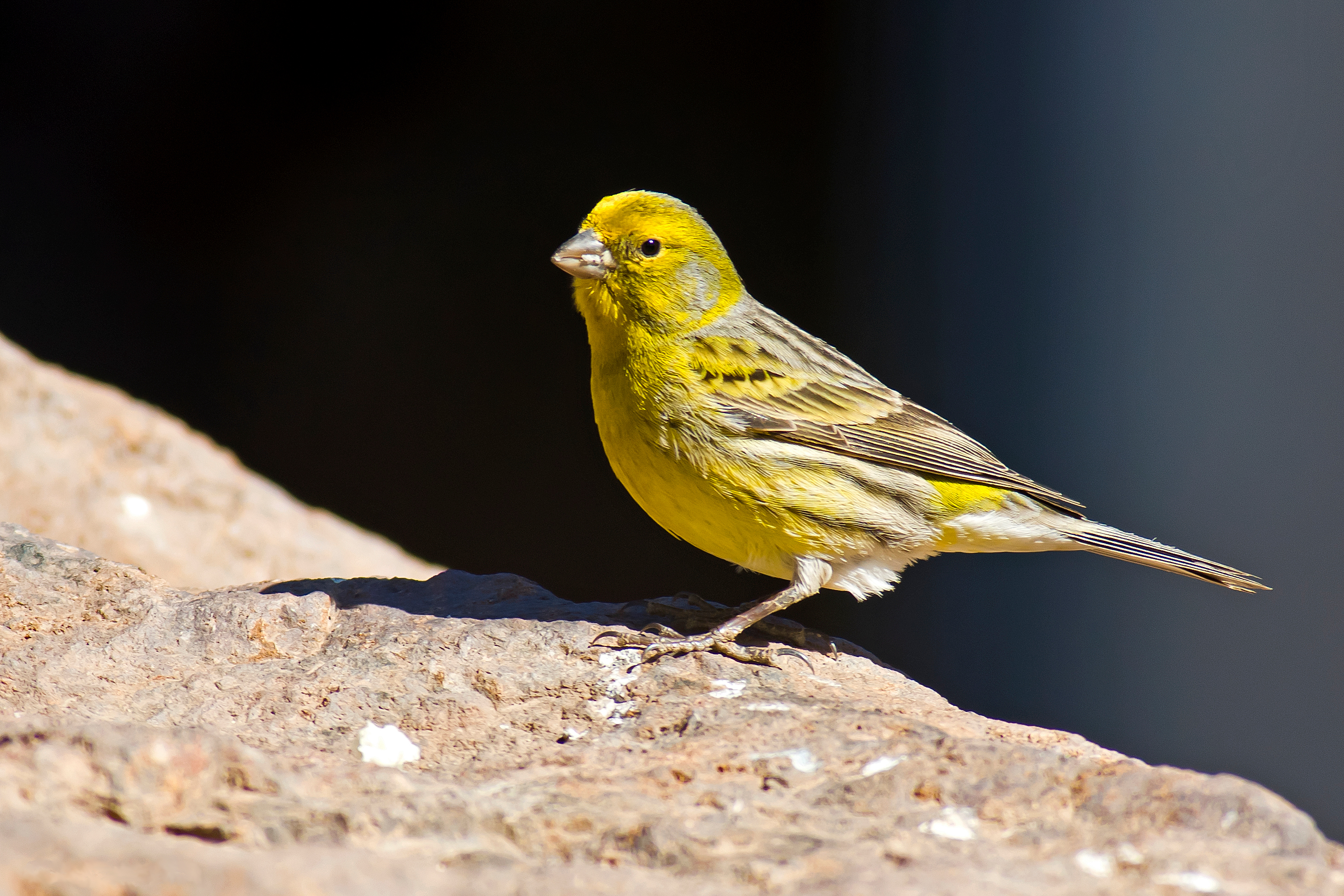
- Male in Gran Canaria, Spain

Conservation status
- Least Concern (IUCN 3.1)

Scientific classification
- Kingdom: Animalia
- Phylum: Chordata
- Class: Aves
- Order: Passeriformes
- Family: Fringillidae
- Subfamily: Carduelinae
- Genus: Serinus
- Species: S. canaria

Binomial name
- Serinus canaria (Linnaeus, 1758)

Synonyms
- Fringilla canaria Linnaeus, 1758

= Atlantic canary =

Species of bird

The Atlantic canary (Serinus canaria), known worldwide simply as the wild canary and also called the island canary, common canary, or canary, is a small passerine bird belonging to the genus Serinus in the true finch family, Fringillidae. It is native to the Canary Islands, the Azores, and Madeira. Wild birds are mostly yellow-green, with brownish streaking on the back. The species is common in captivity and a number of colour varieties have been bred.

This bird is the natural symbol of the Canary Islands, together with the Canary Island date palm.

== Taxonomy ==
The Atlantic canary was formally described in 1758 by the Swedish naturalist Carl Linnaeus in the tenth edition of his Systema Naturae. He placed it with the finches in the genus Fringilla and coined the binomial name Fringilla canaria. In 1555 the Swiss naturalist Conrad Gessner had used the Latin name Canaria for the species in his book Historia animalium. The Atlantic canary is now one of eight species placed in the genus Serinus that was introduced in 1816 by the German naturalist Carl Ludwig Koch. The species is considered to be monotypic, with no subspecies being recognised; domesticated canaries are sometimes cited as "S. c. domestica", but this is not an accepted scientific name.

The Atlantic canary's closest relative is the European serin, and the two can produce on average 25% fertile hybrids if crossed.

The bird is named after the Canary Islands. The islands' name is derived from the Latin name canariae insulae ("islands of dogs") used by Arnobius, referring to the large dogs kept by the inhabitants of the islands. A legend of the islands, however, states that it was the conquistadors who named the islands after a fierce tribe inhabiting the largest island of the group, known as the 'Canarii'. The colour canary yellow is in turn named after the yellow domestic canary, produced by a mutation which suppressed the melanins of the original dull greenish wild Atlantic canary colour.

== Description ==
The Atlantic canary can range from 10 to 12 cm (3.9 to 4.7 in) in length, with a wingspan of 21 to 23.7 cm (8.3 to 9.3 in) and a weight of 8.4 to 24.3 g (0.30 to 0.86 oz), with an average of around 15 g (0.53 oz). The male has a largely yellow-green head and underparts with a yellower forehead, face and supercilium. The lower belly and undertail-coverts are whitish and there are some dark streaks on the sides. The upperparts are grey-green with dark streaks and the rump is dull yellow. The female is similar to the male but duller with a greyer head and breast and less yellow underparts. Juvenile birds are largely brown with dark streaks.

It is about 10% larger, longer and less contrasted than its relative the European serin, and has more grey and brown in its plumage and relatively shorter wings.

The song is a silvery twittering similar to the songs of the European serin and citril finch.

== Distribution and habitat ==
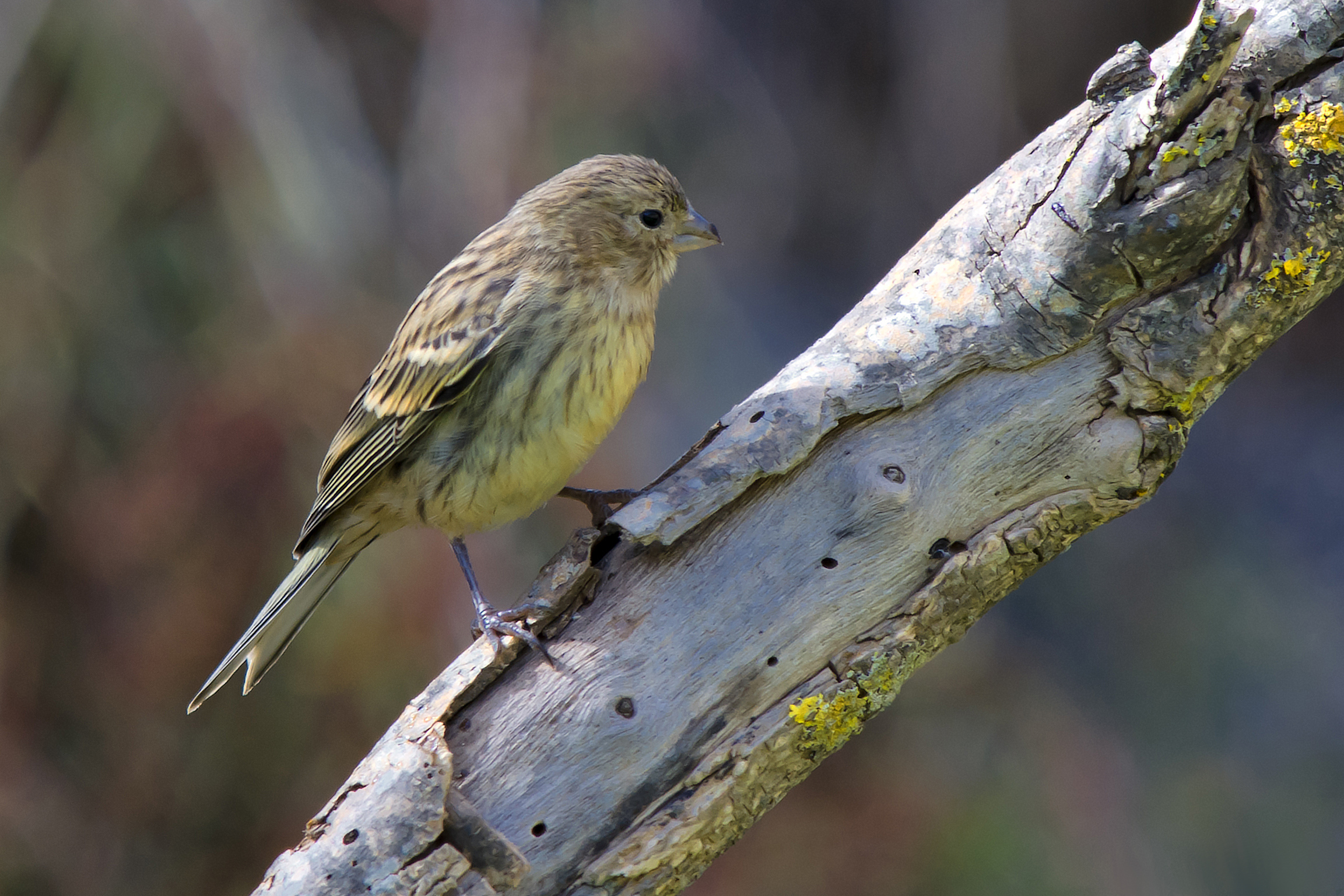
Juvenile on Gran Canaria, Canary Islands, Spain

It is endemic to the Canary Islands, Azores and Madeira in the region known as Macaronesia in the eastern Atlantic Ocean. In the Canary Islands, it is common on Tenerife, La Gomera, La Palma and El Hierro, but more local on Gran Canaria, and rare on Lanzarote and Fuerteventura, where it has only recently begun breeding. It is common in Madeira including Porto Santo and the Desertas Islands, and has been recorded on the Savage Islands. In the Azores, it is common on all islands. The population has been estimated at 80,000-90,000 pairs in the Canary Islands, 30,000-60,000 pairs in the Azores and 4,000-5,000 pairs in Madeira.

It occurs in a wide variety of habitats from pine and laurel forests to sand dunes. It is most common in semiopen areas with small trees such as orchards and copses. It frequently occurs in man-made habitats such as parks and gardens. It is found from sea-level up to at least 760 m in Madeira, 1,100 m in the Azores and to above 1,500 m in the Canary Islands.

It has become established on Midway Atoll in the northwest Hawaiian Islands, where it was first introduced in 1911. It was also introduced to neighbouring Kure Atoll, but failed to become established there. Birds were introduced to Bermuda in 1930 and quickly started breeding, but they began to decline in the 1940s after scale insects devastated the population of Bermuda cedar, and by the 1960s they had died out. The species also occurs in Puerto Rico, but is not yet established there. They are also found on Ascension Island.

== Behaviour ==
=== Reproduction ===
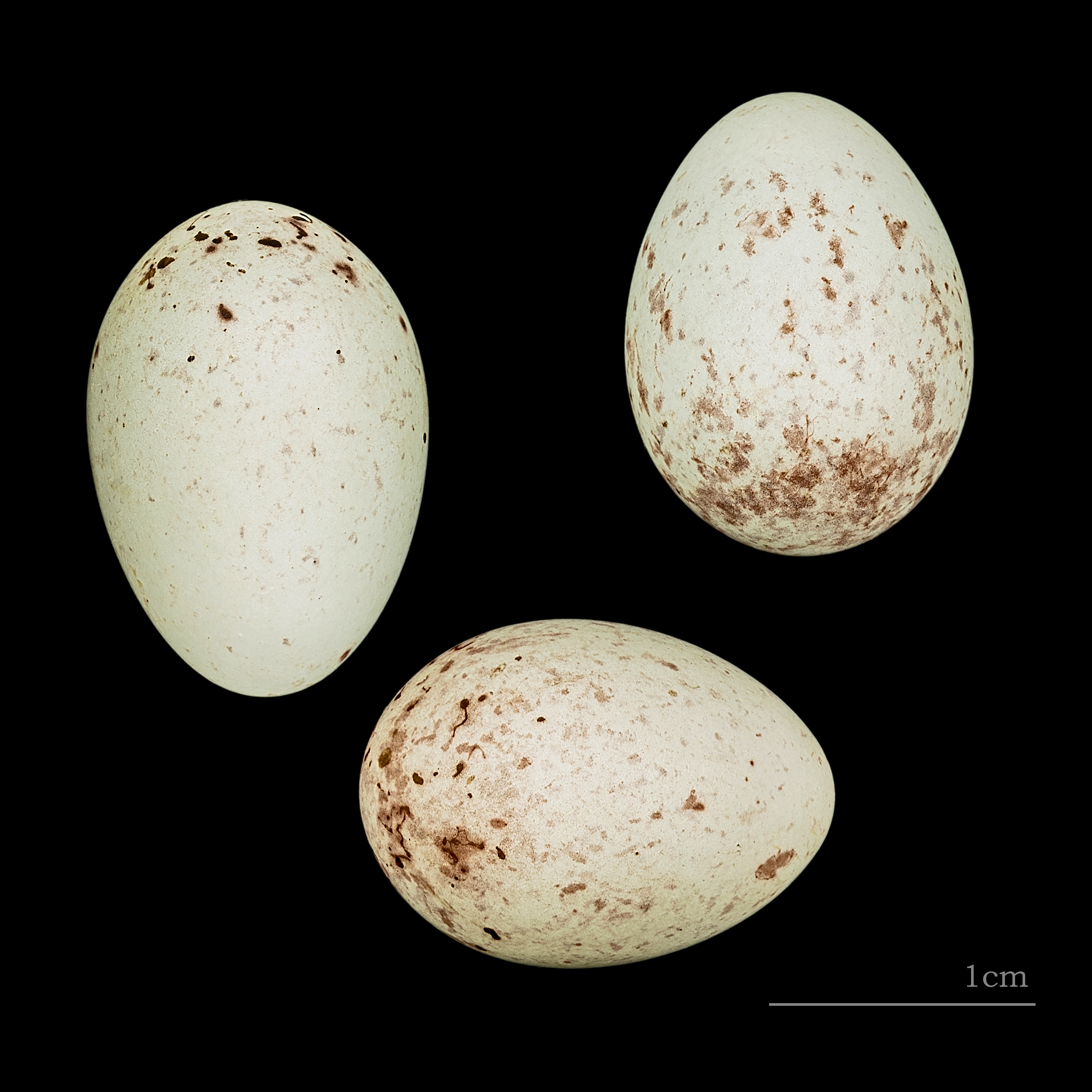
Eggs of Serinus canaria canaria Tenerife MHNT

It is a gregarious bird which often nests in groups with each pair defending a small territory. The cup-shaped nest is built 1–6 m above the ground in a tree or bush, most commonly at 3–4 m. It is well-hidden amongst leaves, often at the end of a branch or in a fork. It is made of twigs, grass, moss and other plant material and lined with soft material including hair and feathers.

The eggs are laid between January and July in the Canary Islands, from March to June with a peak of April and May in Madeira and from March to July with a peak of May and June in the Azores. They are pale blue or blue-green with violet or reddish markings concentrated at the broad end. A clutch contains 3 to 4 or occasionally 5 eggs and 2–3 broods are raised each year. The eggs are incubated for 13–14 days and the young birds leave the nest after 14–21 days, most commonly after 15–17 days.

Inbreeding depression occurs in S. canaria and is more severe during early development under the stressful conditions associated with hatching asynchrony. Hatching asynchrony leads to differences in age and thus in size, so that the environment of the first hatched is relatively benign, compared to that of the last hatched.

=== Feeding ===
It typically feeds in flocks, foraging on the ground or amongst low vegetation. It mainly feeds on seeds such as those of weeds, grasses and figs. It also feeds on other plant material and small insects.

== See also ==
- List of animal and plant symbols of the Canary Islands
- Domestic canary
- Australian plainhead
- Harz Roller
- Red factor canary
