= Sankt Andreasberg =

- Stadtteil of Braunlage
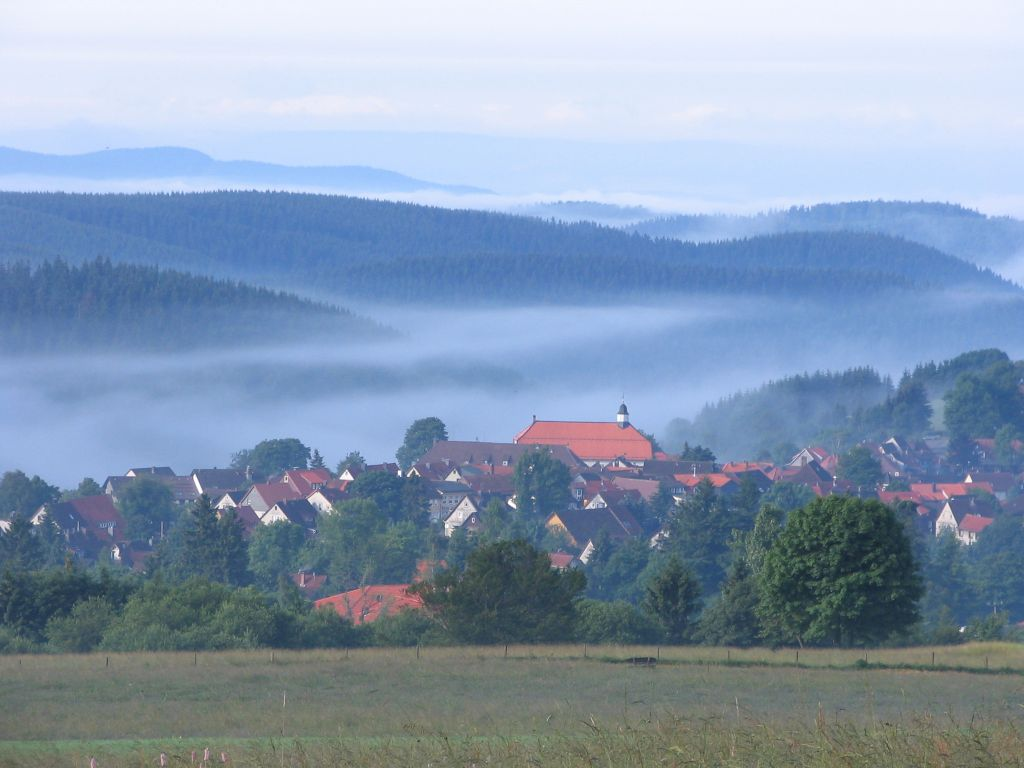
- Sankt Andreasberg in the mist

- Coat of arms
- Interactive map of Sankt Andreasberg
- Location within Germany Location within Lower Saxony
- Coordinates: 51°42′38″N 10°31′06″E
- Country: Germany
- State: Lower Saxony
- District: Goslar
- Town: Braunlage

Area
  - Total: 9.85 km^{2} (3.80 sq mi)
- Elevation: 580 m (1,900 ft)

Population (2010-12-31)
  - Total: 1,719
  - Density: 175/km^{2} (452/sq mi)
- Time zone: UTC+01:00 (CET)
  - Summer (DST): UTC+02:00 (CEST)
- Postal codes: 37444
- Dialling codes: 05582, 05520
- Vehicle registration: GS
- Website: www.sankt-andreasberg.de

Sankt Andreasberg (pronounced [zaŋkt anˈdʁeasˌbɛʁk]) is a former independent city in the district of Goslar, in Lower Saxony, Germany. Since 1 November 2011, it has formed part of the town Braunlage. It is situated in the Harz, approximately 7 km (4.3 mi) west of Braunlage proper, and 20 km (12 mi) east of Osterode am Harz.

== History ==
Sankt Andreasberg was founded in the 1480s. It was first mentioned in a letter from the Count Heinrich zu Stolberg to Dietrich von Witzlebenon on 3 November 1487. The establishment of the village took place around the market. The first silver mines are assumed to be the St. Andrews Cross Mine (German: Grube St. Andreaskreuz) at the foot of the Beerberg and the St. Andrews Mine (Grube St. Andreas) by the market. In 1521, St. Andreasberg received the right to mine from Counts Heinrich and Ernst von Hohenstein. It was proclaimed in Mansfelder Land and in the mining areas of Saxony and miners were invited to dig for silver and other metals.

=== Natural monuments ===
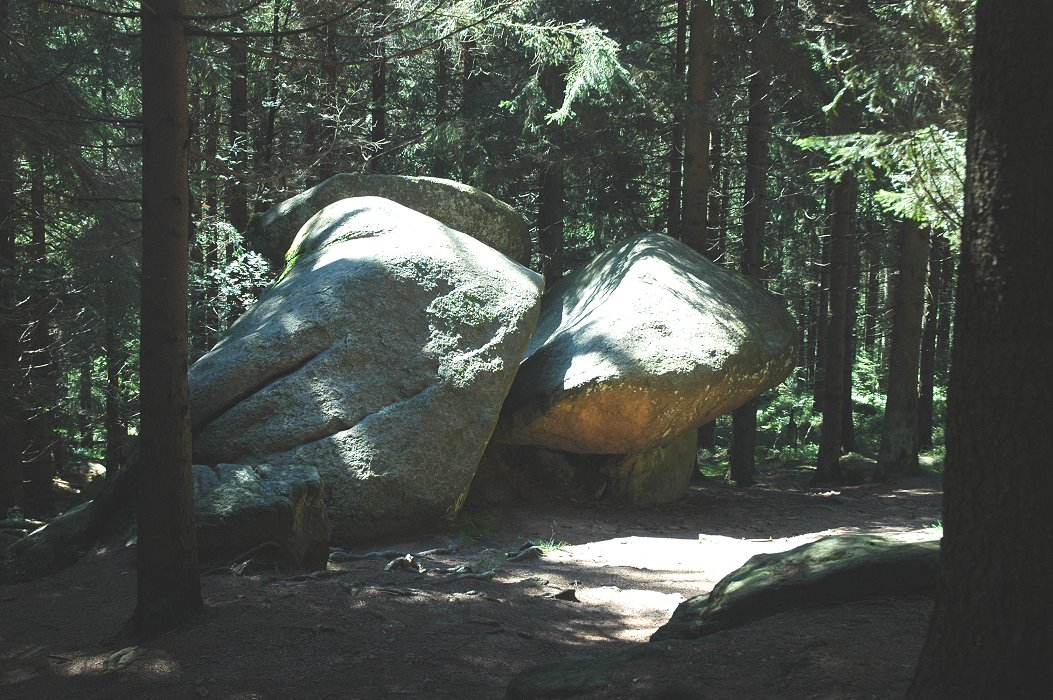
Granite blocks: the Dreibrodesteine

The area around Sankt Andreasberg is especially rich in habitats worthy of protection in within the Harz National Park, but also around the town in the form of Upper Harz mountain meadows. In the national park north-northwest of Sankt Andreasberg are the Dreibrodesteine (at ca. 641 m above NN; 51°43′57″N 10°30′40″E; ND GS 43), three outsize blocks of granite that have been formed by spheroidal weathering. According to legend they originated as the three loaves of bread of a heartless woman who would not help a starving miner. With the words

Meine drei Brote sollen lieber zu Steinen werden

("I'd rather my three loaves became stones") she spurned the miner, whereupon the loaves grew into giant stones and squashed the woman into the mossy earth. The granite blocks were considered a warning against heartlessness. At the Dreibrodesteine is checkpoint no. 154 (Dreibrodestein) in the Harzer Wandernadel hiking system and a memorial to the foresters and officials of the Andreasberg Forestry Office who fell in the two world wars.

Other natural monuments are a group of chestnuts on the market square (ND GS 42) and the diabase deposit in the village of Silberhütte (ND GS 45). Johann Wolfgang von Goethe researched in 1783 the Hohe Klippen rocks (ND GS 146) on the Rehberg mountain above the present-day Goethe Place on the Rehberger Graben (ditch), because he believed he would find evidence there for his assumptions about the earth's history. The boundary between the geological platform made of greywacke hornfels and the underlying fine-grained granite from Brocken runs by the Hohe Klippen.

== Religion ==
The population of Sankt Andreasberg is mostly Protestant.

== Sport ==
As a result of their elevation, Sankt Andreasberg (520–720 m [1,710–2,360 ft]) and Sonnenberg (800–850 m [2,620–2,790 ft]) still have fairly guaranteed snow. Sankt Andreasberg is an Alpine Ski Centre of the Harz, with three T-bar lifts on the Sonnenberg as well as two double chairlifts and three T-bars at the Matthias Schmidt Mountain Centre. In the Teichtal there is the first snow tubing track in the Harz. The cross-country skiing trail network around Sankt Andreasberg has 40 km (25 mi) of tracks and is linked from the Sonnenberg to Oderbrück / Torfhaus and to the Ackerloipe / Altenau networks. On Matthias Schmidt Mountain a summer toboggan is open during the summer. Nordic walking, hiking, mountain biking and trekking are popular summer activities in the peaceful surroundings of the Sankt Andreasberg mountain town. In the spa park there is a ropes course and climbing park. The southern part of the Oderteich reservoir in the Harz National Park is open to swimmers in the summer.

Coming from Torfhaus and Oderteich, the Brocken bypass section of the nearly 100 km (62 mi) long Harzer Hexenstieg hiking trail passes through the town and heads for Braunlage and Thale.

Mountain rescue services are provided by the local Harz Mountain Rescue Club.

Several Sankt Andreasberg sports clubs enjoy a long tradition. These include the Sankt Andreasberg Shooting Club (1522) and the Sankt Andreasberg Gymnastics and Sports Club (1861). Following the success of the 1st Winterfest in 1896 the Upper Harz Ski Club was founded on the Brocken; it is now called the St. Andreasberg Ski Club 1896.

== Famous people ==
- Wilhelm Trute (1836–1889), breeder of the Harz Roller canary breed and a local miner
