= Harz Roller =

Breed of domestic canary from the Upper Harz, Germany

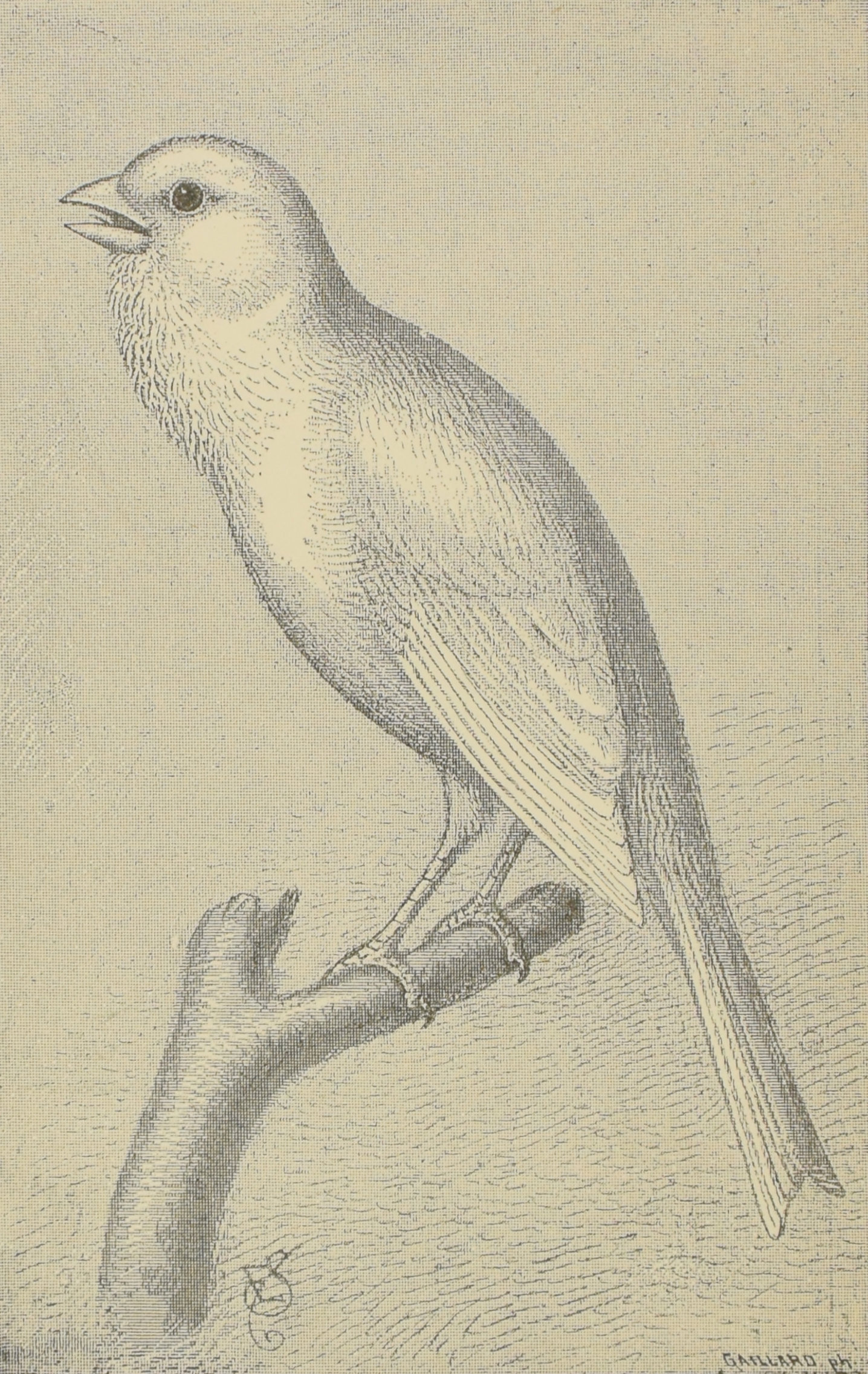
"The Hartz Canary-Bird (or German Whistler)", from "Canary birds – how to breed for profit or pleasure" (1880)

Harz Roller (German: Harzer Roller [ˈhaʁtsɐ ˈʁɔlɐ]) is the name of a breed of domestic canary bred in the Upper Harz mountains of Germany. The birds were bred in the Upper Harz between Lautenthal and Sankt Andreasberg in the middle of the 19th century and achieved European-wide fame. The song of the Harz Roller, like that of the common canary, is clear and consists of alternating beats, trills, and rolls—which is where the Harz Roller gets its name. The special song, which has made this breed a "best-selling export," must be learned.

The Harz Roller is also alternatively called the Roller Canary and was also known and spelt as Hartz Mountain Canary in historic American sources.

== History ==
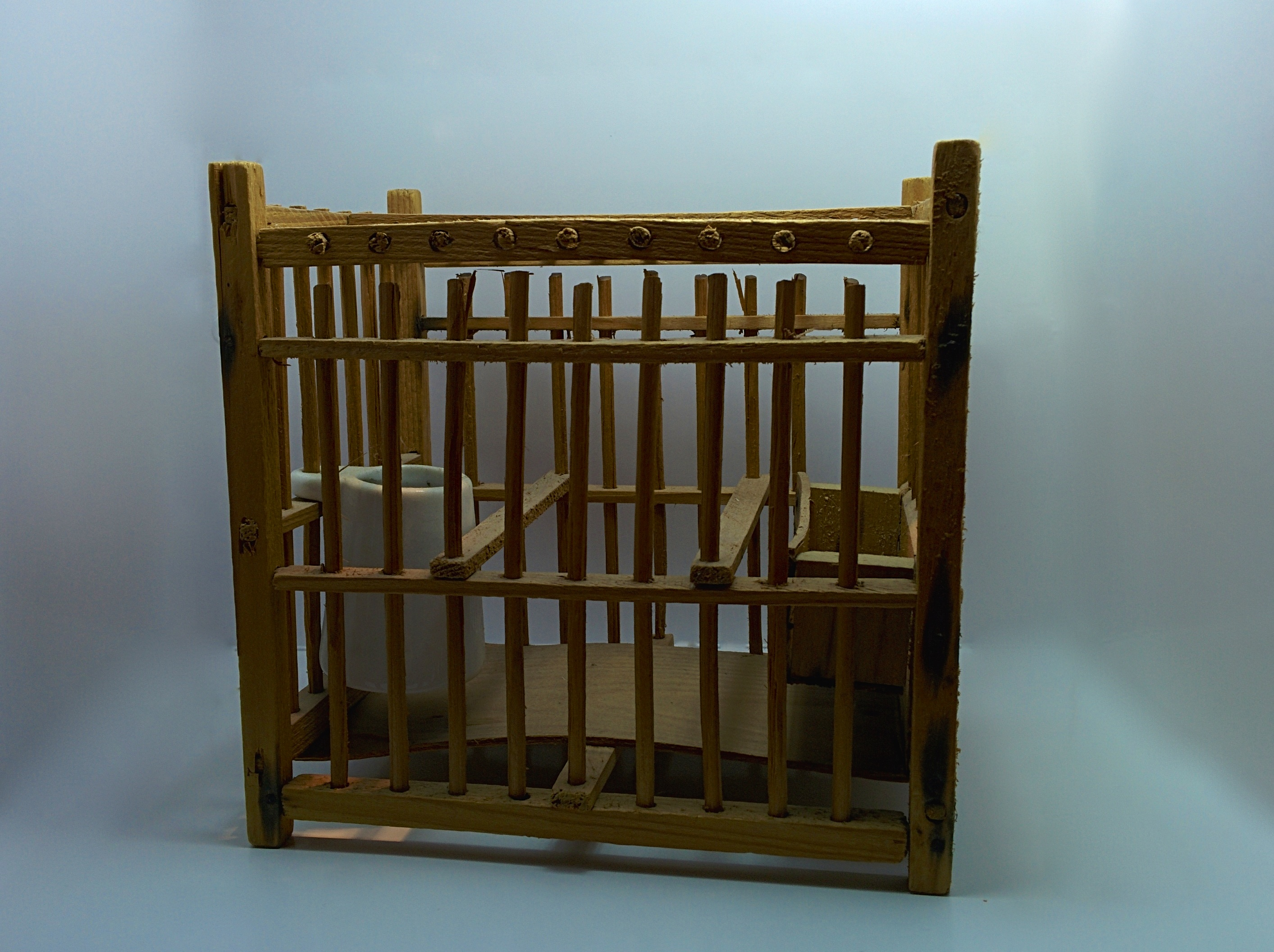
Transport birdcage for canaries as used for the Harzer Roller canary breed in the 18th and 19th century

The Harz Roller descends from the Atlantic canary, which was introduced to Europe from Madeira and the Azores. Miners from Imst brought the canary to the Upper Harz region as a pet around 1730 in search of work. The wild canary has greenish-yellow and gray plumage, which developed into the Harz Roller during domestication to pale yellow to golden yellow. More recent breeds also include cinnamon-red, cinnamon-brown, orange-yellow, mottled, and tabby birds.

Since 2001 there has been a Harz Roller Museum in Sankt Andreasberg.

== Song ==
By patient breeding, a breed of canary was able to be produced that had a pleasant, melodious song, full of variety and delivered with an apparently closed beak. Different types of canaries can breed with each other, especially including the Harz Roller and the Spanish Timbrado.

== Miner's canary ==
The breeding and sale of this popular breed of canary was an important secondary occupation for mining people, as was the making of cages for the birds. In the second half of the 19th century, the breeding and sale of these canaries boomed. As only the cocks, as part of their courtship behaviour, were able to sing the popular song, hens were less suitable for sale. Since only a few hens were needed for breeding, the remaining birds, as well as wild birds caught for this purpose, could be used as warning devices in the mines.

The birds were used as a warning system against used air (German: Matte Wetter), i.e. to indicate the presence of poisonous gases such as carbon monoxide and low levels of oxygen in the surrounding air. Canaries were especially good for this purpose as, unlike finches, doves and mice, they reacted very quickly to carbon monoxide. While a mouse would not have a noticeable reaction until after up to 70 minutes to a carbon monoxide concentration of 0.77% in the air, a canary will fall off its perch after as little as 2.5 minutes from a concentration of 0.29%. For this reason, canaries were not only used in normal operations, but especially to protect rescue units in the case of an accident.

== See also ==
- Wilhelm Trute - breeder
- Domestic canary
- Atlantic canary (wild canary)
- Birdcage
