= St Catherine's School, Germiston =

Coordinates: 26°14′20″S 28°10′52″E

Location
- Piercy Avenue, Parkhill Gardens; Germiston, Gauteng; South Africa

Information
- Type: Private, co-educational day school
- Motto: Veritas (Latin: "Truth")
- Religious affiliation: Catholic
- Established: 1908; 118 years ago
- Founder: Mother Rose Niland
- School number: 011 827 4102
- Headmaster: Dennis Maritz
- Exam board: IEB
- Teaching staff: 65
- Grades: 000-12
- Gender: Co-educational
- Age: 4 to 18
- Enrollment: 601(2024)
- Language: English
- Campus: Metropolitan
- Campus type: Suburban
- Houses: St Catherine's; St Dominic's; St Patrick's
- Colours: Black; White; Sky blue
- Nickname: STC
- Accreditation: UMALUSI OISESA IEB
- Yearbook: St. Catherine's Chronicle
- Affiliations: ISASA CIE
- Website: stcatherines.org.za

St Catherine's School is an independent, co-educational school in Germiston, Gauteng named after Saint Catherine of Siena. A combined school, St Catherine's consists of a pre-school, a preparatory school and a senior school and is the oldest school in Germiston.

== History ==
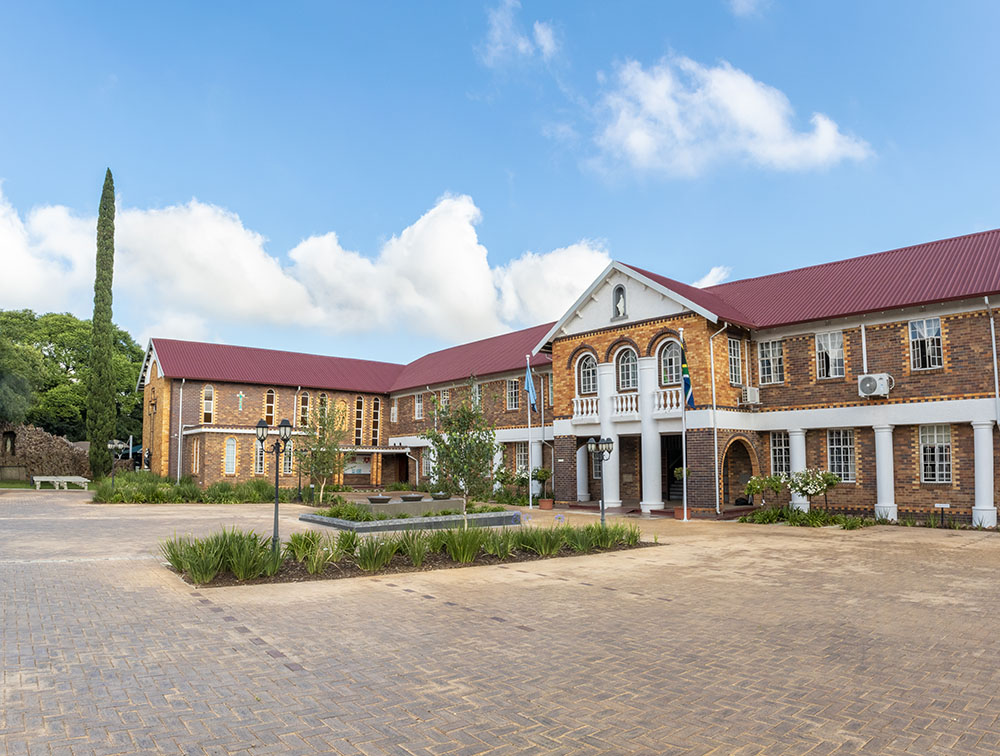
The front of St. Catherine's School

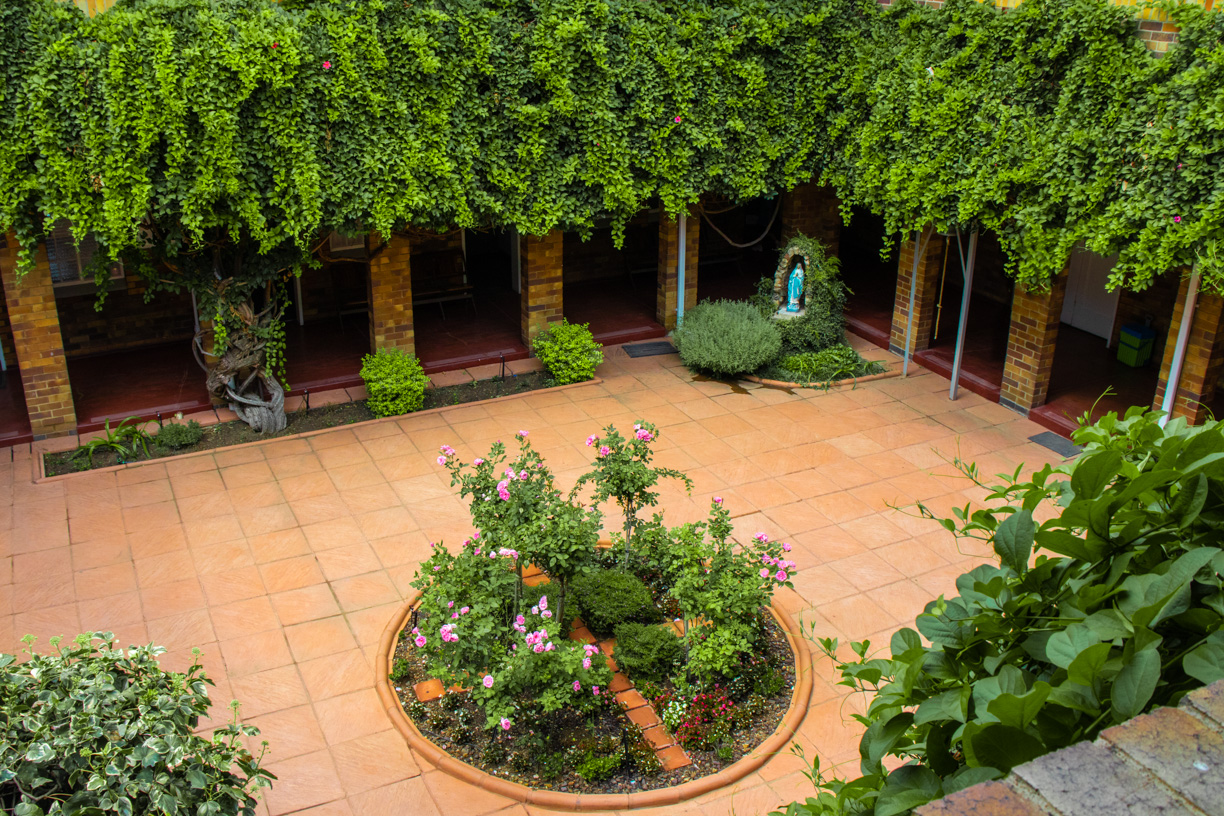
The Quad at St Catherine's School

St Catherine's School was founded in 1908 by the Dominican Sisters of St. Catherine of Siena, Newcastle, Natal in order to meet the increasing demand for education in the then 22-year-old mining town of Germiston (a product of the Witwatersrand Gold Rush of 1886). The original school building was located on Hardach Street in central Germiston, and was built on land bought from the Simmer and Jack gold mining company. It was the first convent on the East Rand and the first high school in Germiston.

By the 1940s, the school's environs in the Germiston CBD were undergoing rapid industrialisation, concurrent with a general shift from north to south of much of Germiston's population, and in 1948 St Catherine's School relocated to the then newly developed suburb of Parkhill Gardens. Here there was also more space for sporting facilities. The new school buildings were designed in a toned-down Romanesque Revival style, influenced by the late-nineteenth and early-twentieth century Arts and Crafts Movement, by the Irish Catholic architect Brendan Joseph Clinch, an associate of Herbert Baker.

Toward the end of 1968 the school decided, in conjunction with its sister school St Dominic's in Boksburg, to cater for primary school pupils only: girls up to standard 5 (grade 7) and boys up to standard 1 (grade 3). Additionally, in 1970 the Transvaal Education Department recognised and registered the St Catherine's pre-primary school.

The first reported ghost sighting at St Catherine's occurred on 17 August 1972, when a janitor cleaning the school hall after hours claimed to have been chased into the quad by an amorphous grey apparition or "spook" with "glowing red eyes". From the beginning of 1977, a wave of sightings followed of a "grey, hooded figure swaddled in flowing robes", often accompanied by a "'wailing' sound". The ghost, said to haunt the school hall, the chapel, the basement and a number of classrooms in the eastern wing, was soon dubbed Patrick, after one of the school's houses, St Patrick's. After 1977, ghost sightings at St Catherine's mostly ceased, although stories of paranormal happenings at the school persist to the present.

In 1985, the school extended its education of boys to standard 5 again. This was followed in 1991 by the Sisters of St Catherine's moving into a private house, opening up more room in the school for classrooms.

In 2001 the Board of Governors approved the re-opening of the high school, and that year saw the first intake of grade 8 pupils since 1968. At the same time the school buildings were expanded, with the construction of a new wing that was completed and fully occupied by 2007. Mrs J. Crosby, formerly of Boksburg High School, stepped in as high school principal in June 2007. In 2008 the school celebrated its centenary with a centennial mass, held under a marquee on the main soccer field which was attended by more than 800 pupils, parents, staff, past pupils and past teachers.

In December 2015, Mrs V. Johnson became head of school. The new preparatory school principal, Mrs S. Rodrigues, began her term in January 2016. With the retirement of the pre-school principal, Mrs T. Henry, the new pre-school principal, Mrs C. Stewart, began her term in January 2016.

In May 2016, the head of school, Mrs Johnson, announced that she would be retiring in December of the same year. She was succeeded by Dennis Maritz, formerly of Cornwall Hill College in Pretoria in 2017. The primary school is now known as the preparatory school and the high school is now known as the senior school.

The Aelred O'Donovan wing was completed at the end of 2018. The wing consists of six classrooms which were built to accommodate pupils in Grades one and two. The wing bears the name of Sister Aelred O'Donovan who was the last Newcastle Dominican Sister to hold the post of head of school.

In 2022 the school opened and dedicated a STEAM Centre. The facility was blessed by the Archbishop of Johannesburg, Buti Tlhagale, and unveiled by Sister Stephany Thiel, the regional prioress. The STEAM Centre consists of an art studio and exhibition area, two laboratories, a computer centre and a robotics and coding venue. The Rose Niland Bell Tower, which forms an integral part of the centre, was erected to honour the school's founder, Mother Rose Niland. At the end of 2025, Mr. Maritz retired after nine years of service to the school.

=== Heritage status ===
The Johannesburg Heritage Foundation has recognised the historical and architectural significance of the St Catherine's School buildings, conferring a blue plaque on the school in 2021.

== Academics ==
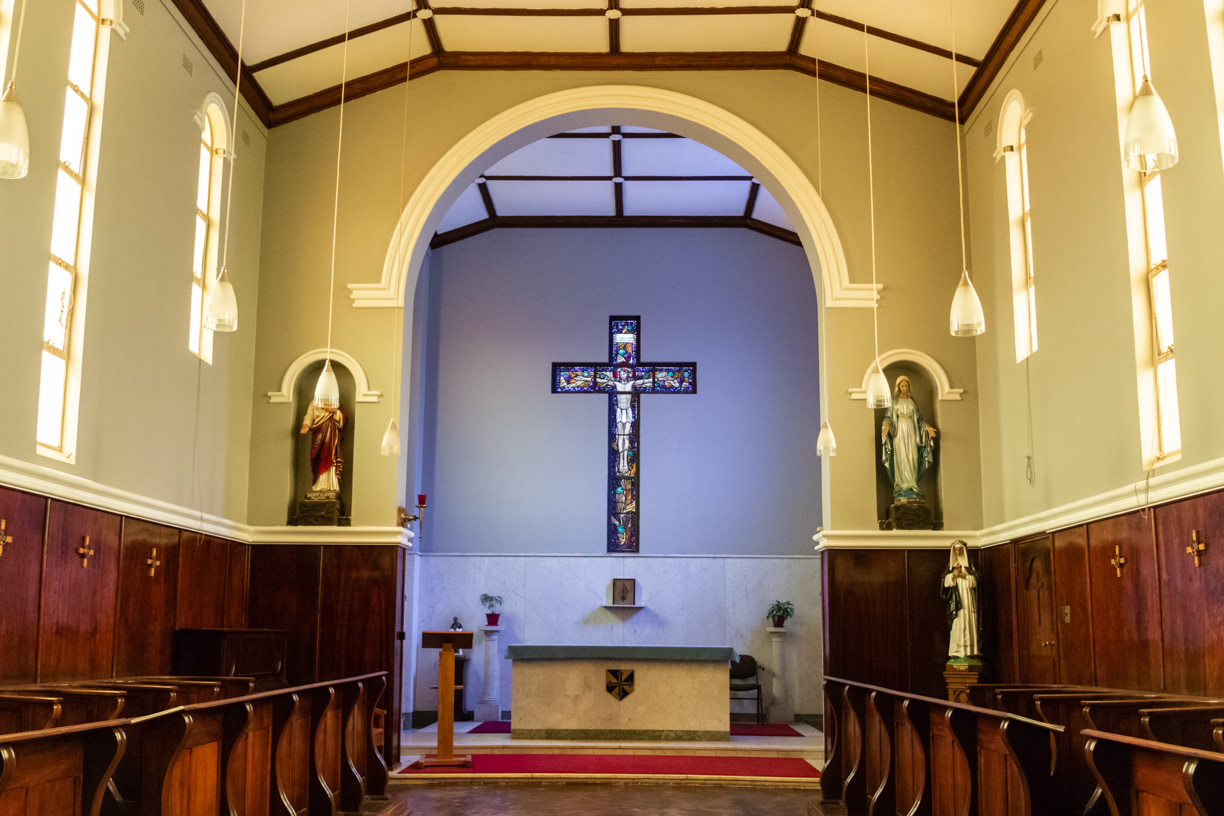
Inside the Chapel at St Catherine's School

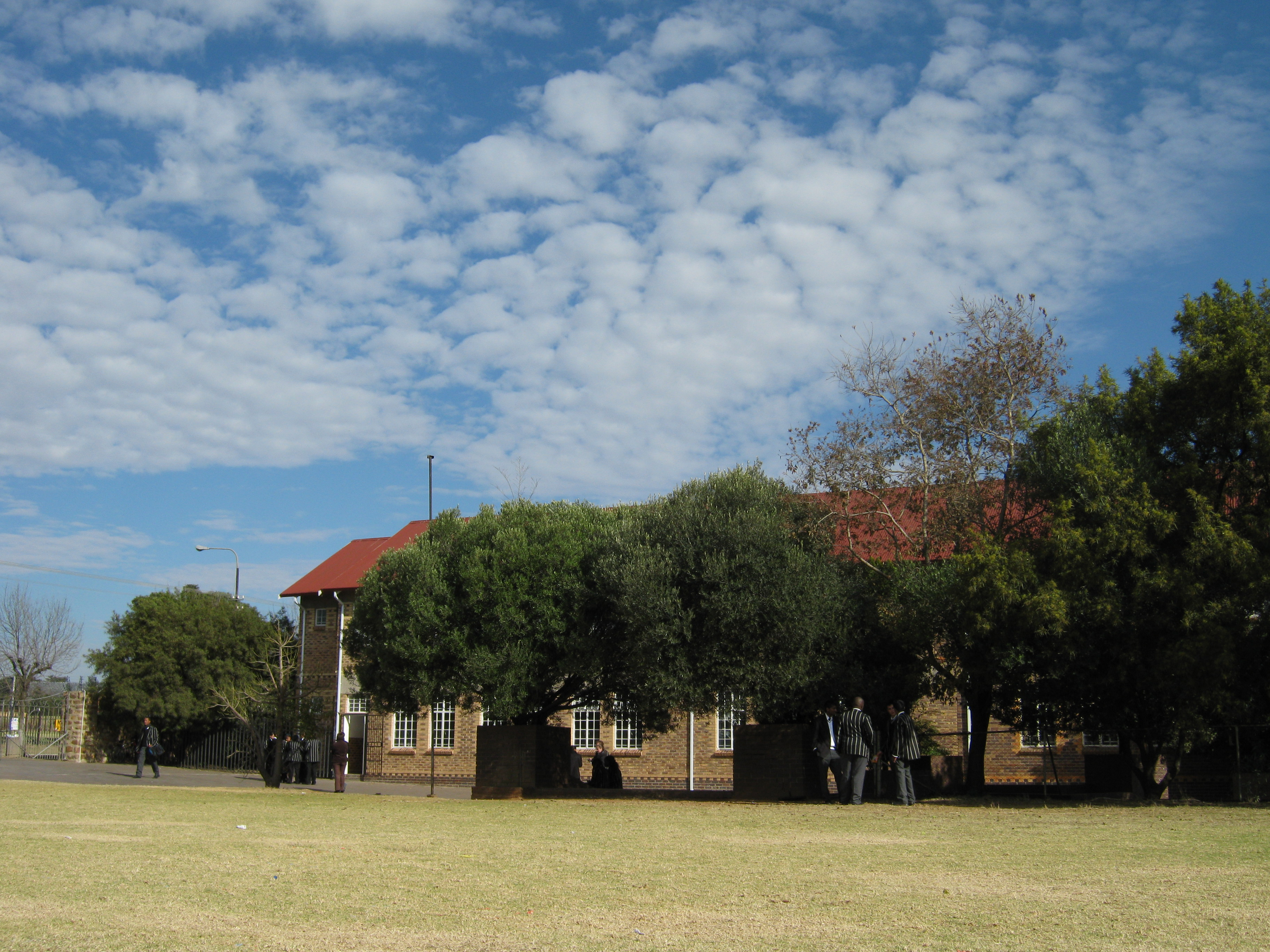
The Senior School wing of St Catherine's School seen from the sports field.

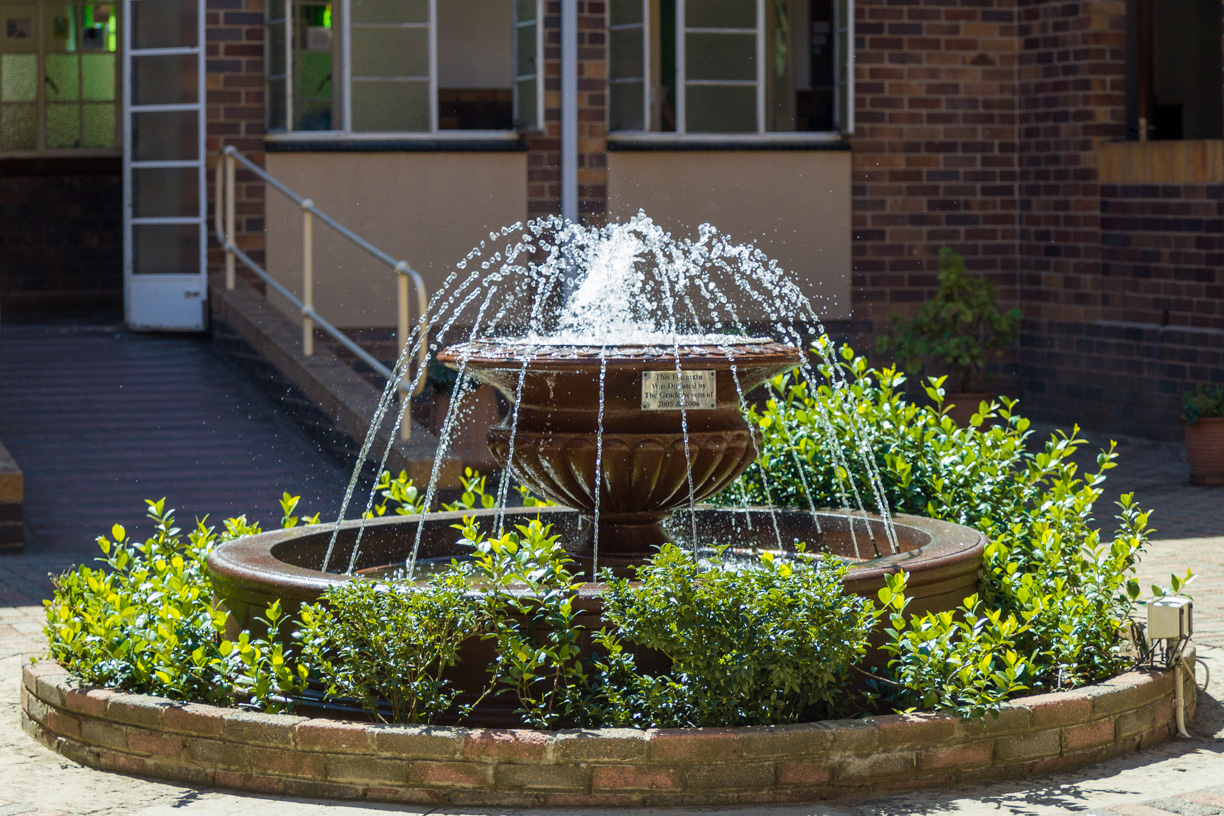
Water fountain in the senior quad at St Catherine's School

St Catherine's matriculants and grade 9 pupils write exams set by the Independent Examinations Board (IEB). The IEB is an organisation whose examinations are written by independent schools throughout South Africa. These examinations conform to the requirements of the National Senior Certificate and are recognised both internationally and by all South African universities.

The subjects taken from grades 1 to 3 (junior phase) are:

- English
- Afrikaans
- Zulu
- Mathematics
- Religious education
- Life orientation
- Physical education
- Music
- Computer studies
- Coding and Robotics

The compulsory subjects for Grade 4 to 6 (intermediate phase) and Grade 7 (senior phase) are:

- English
- Afrikaans (first additional language)
- isiZulu (second additional language)
- Mathematics
- Natural sciences
- Geography
- History
- Technology
- Life orientation
- Religious education
- Music
- Drama
- Art
- Computer studies
- Economic and management science (Grade 7 Only)
- Physical education
- Coding and Robotics

The subjects offered from grade 8 to Matric at St Catherine's are:

- Accounting
- Afrikaans (second language)
- Business studies
- CAT (Grade 10 – 12)
- English (compulsory)
- Geography
- History
- Creative arts (grades 8–9) and Visual arts (grades 10–12)
- isiZulu (second language)
- Life orientation (compulsory)
- Mathematics or Mathematical literacy
- Life sciences
- Physical science
- Religious education (compulsory)
- Coding and Robotics (Gr.8 &9)

== Sport ==
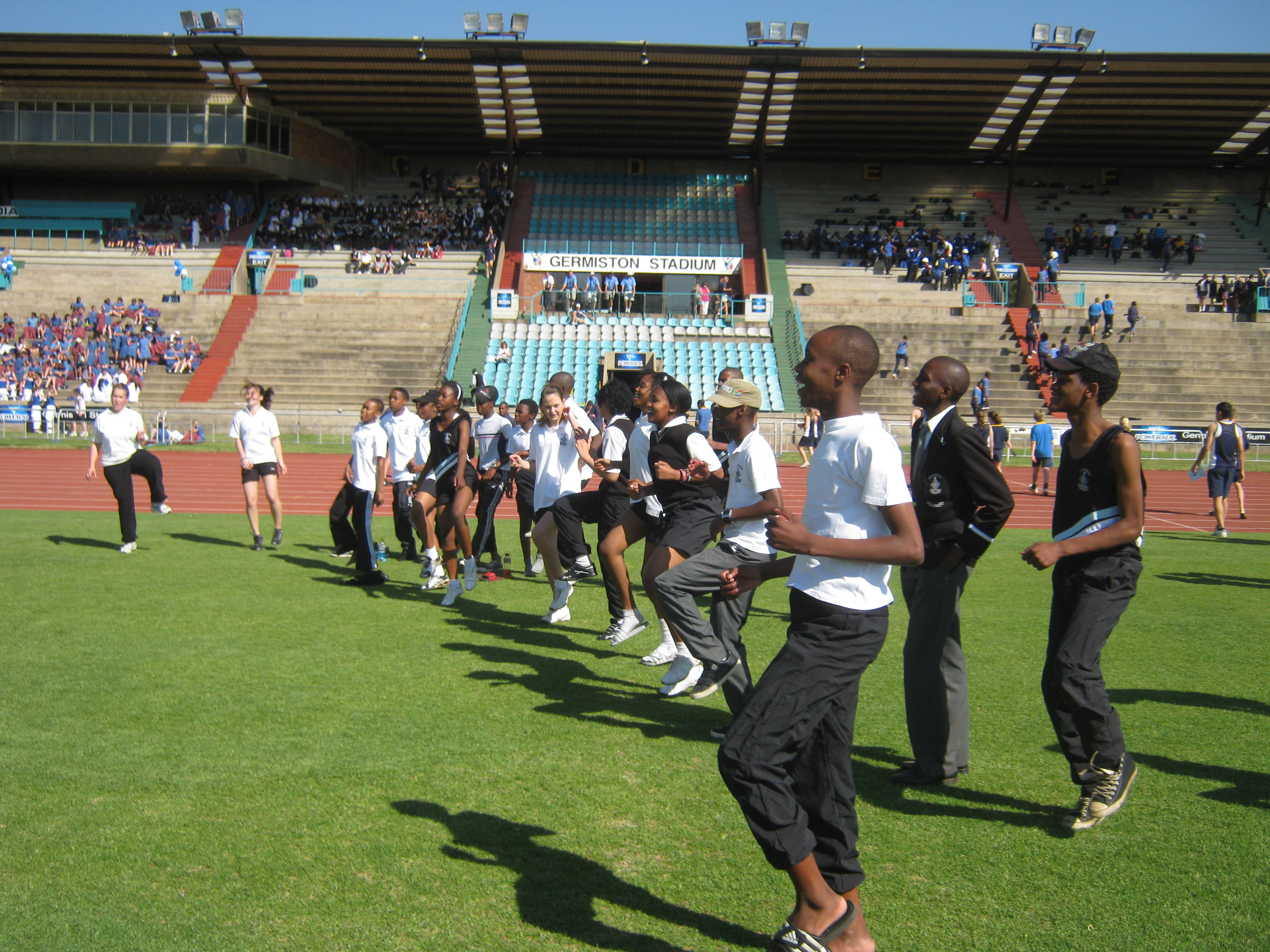
St Catherine's senior school athletes warm up ahead of an inter-school competition.

St Catherine's pupils also participate in a wide variety of sports. Sports at the school include soccer, cricket, tennis, netball, athletics and swimming. There are both male and female soccer teams representing the school with the girls' soccer team being a new addition, nicknamed the 'Saint's Soccer Team'. St Catherine's has also, since 2007, been competing in the Germiston inter-high swimming gala, where it has been somewhat successful.
