= Pegaret Anthony =

English painter

- Born: Pegaret Keeling; 1 November 1915; Totnes, Devon
- Died: 25 May 2000 (aged 84); London
- Education: King's College of Household and Social Science; Central School of Art and Design
- Known for: watercolourist
- Spouse: John Victor Caldecott Anthony

Pegaret Anthony (née Keeling; 1 November 1915 – 25 May 2000) was an English artist and lecturer in Historical Costume and Theatre History, best known for her watercolour paintings of war workers during the Second World War.

== Early years ==
Pegaret Keeling was born on 1 November 1915 in Totnes, Devon, the daughter of Jessie (née Howes) and Guy William Keeling. Her maternal grandfather was the Victorian artist Thomas Howes. She was educated at The King Alfred School in Hampstead, and King's College of Household and Social Science at the University of London. As an 18-year-old student she travelled alone to Montreal in Canada, arriving back in London on 26 August 1934. From 1934 to 1938 she was a student at the Central School of Art and Design, where she studied under Jeanetta Cochrane, a theatre practitioner specialising in costume and scenic design. In her final year there she was a holder of the William Atkinson Scholarship for theatrical design.

== Career ==
During the 1930s Anthony was involved in costume, theatre and fashion-related activities, which included a fashion show at Grosvenor House in 1937, the dresses from which were subsequently used in early television broadcasts from Alexandra Palace. She was in charge of the décor and scene painting for a production of George Bernard Shaw's Saint Joan in 1938, and was the chief designer for the Birmingham Centenary Pageant in 1938, which had 5000 performers. Also in 1938 Anthony painted the scenery for a production of The Scarlet Pimpernel at the Embassy Theatre, and was wardrobe mistress for the pantomime Babes in the Wood at the Unity Theatre in 1939.

'Women at Work' (c.1943), an example of Anthony's watercolour paintings of war workers during World War II

After completing the course at the Central School of Art, she was asked to return to teach and remained at the college for almost forty years, teaching classes on the history of dress. She would take students to the Victoria and Albert Museum and the British Museum where they could study historic costumes first hand. Her teaching aids included an extensive slide collection as well as reproductions of paintings and drawings and brass rubbings. Following her work at the Central School she lectured at the Motley School of Theatre Design for a further twenty years.

Anthony was also a caricature artist, but is most noted for her wartime pictures during the Second World War when she painted about 100 watercolours of men and women engaged in war work. During the Second World War she submitted some of her work to the War Artists Advisory Committee and two of her watercolour paintings from 1943 were acquired by the Imperial War Museum. In the 1960s she worked for the American film producer Samuel Bronston to research historical costumes for several feature films, including 55 Days at Peking (1963), and The Fall of the Roman Empire (1964).

In 1944 she married John Victor Caldecott Anthony (1912–2001), a chartered surveyor with the Inland Revenue and a great-nephew of the artist Randolph Caldecott. They had a son, Keeling Anthony (1946–2006). Pegaret Anthony died on 25 May 2000 aged 84, and was cremated at Golders Green Crematorium on 30 May 2000.

== Legacy ==
During her career Anthony collected a large archive of material on historical costume. This became the basis of her 1974 work Costume: A General Bibliography, a book she wrote with Janet Arnold which was published by the Costume Society. After her death in 2000, an extensive collection of her work was purchased for the CSM Museum Collection In 2002 the Imperial War Museum purchased fourteen works by Anthony, mostly depicting uniform production in wartime clothing factories.

== Publications ==
- Costume: A General Bibliography, with Janet Arnold, Victoria and Albert Museum and the Costume Society (1974)
