= Queen Elizabeth College =

Former college in London founded as a women's college

- Arms of Queen Elizabeth College
- Former names: King's College of Household and Social Science (1928–1953); King's College for Women (1908–1928); King's College, London Women's Department (1902–1908); King's College, London Ladies' Department (1881–1902)
- Type: Public
- Active: 1953–1985
- Affiliations: University of London
- Location: London, England
- Campus: Urban
- Colours: Red and Gold
- Nickname: QEC
- Website: www.qeca.org.uk
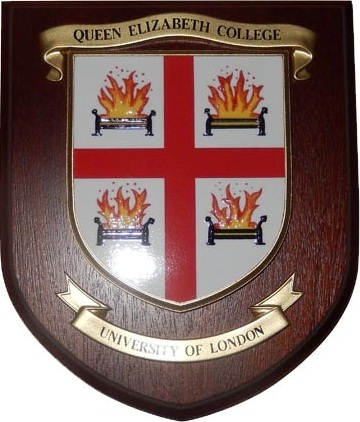

Queen Elizabeth College (QEC) was a college in London. It had its origins in the Ladies' (later Women's) Department of King's College, London, opened in 1885 but which later accepted men as well.

The first King's 'extension' lectures for ladies were held at Richmond in 1871, and from 1878 in Kensington, with chaperones in attendance. In 1881, the Council resolved 'to establish a department of King's College, London, for the higher education of women, to be conducted on the same principles as the existing departments of education at this college'. By 1886, the King's College, London Ladies' Department had 500 students. In 1902 it became the King's College, London Women's Department and in 1908 King's College for Women. In 1907 lectures were given in subjects then thought to be specially relevant to women, such as 'the economics of health' and 'women and the land', and in 1908 systematic instruction in household and social sciences began.

In 1915, the Household and Social Science Department of King's College for Women opened at Campden Hill Road, Kensington, while other departments were transferred to the Strand site. In 1928 the department became completely independent as King's College of Household and Social Science. In 1953 it received a royal charter, its name was changed to Queen Elizabeth College and men were admitted for the first time. The college became distinguished for its teaching and research in nutrition, physiology, hygiene and microbiology. It was recognised as a School of the University of London in 1956.

The original Campden Hill Road buildings combined both of the lecture theatres, the laboratories and the library and also included the only hall of residence – Queen Mary Hall. By the late 1960s the expansion of student numbers and the need for additional laboratory capacity necessitated the construction of a new Building – the Atkins building located on Campden Hill, behind the main college.

== Merger with King's College London ==
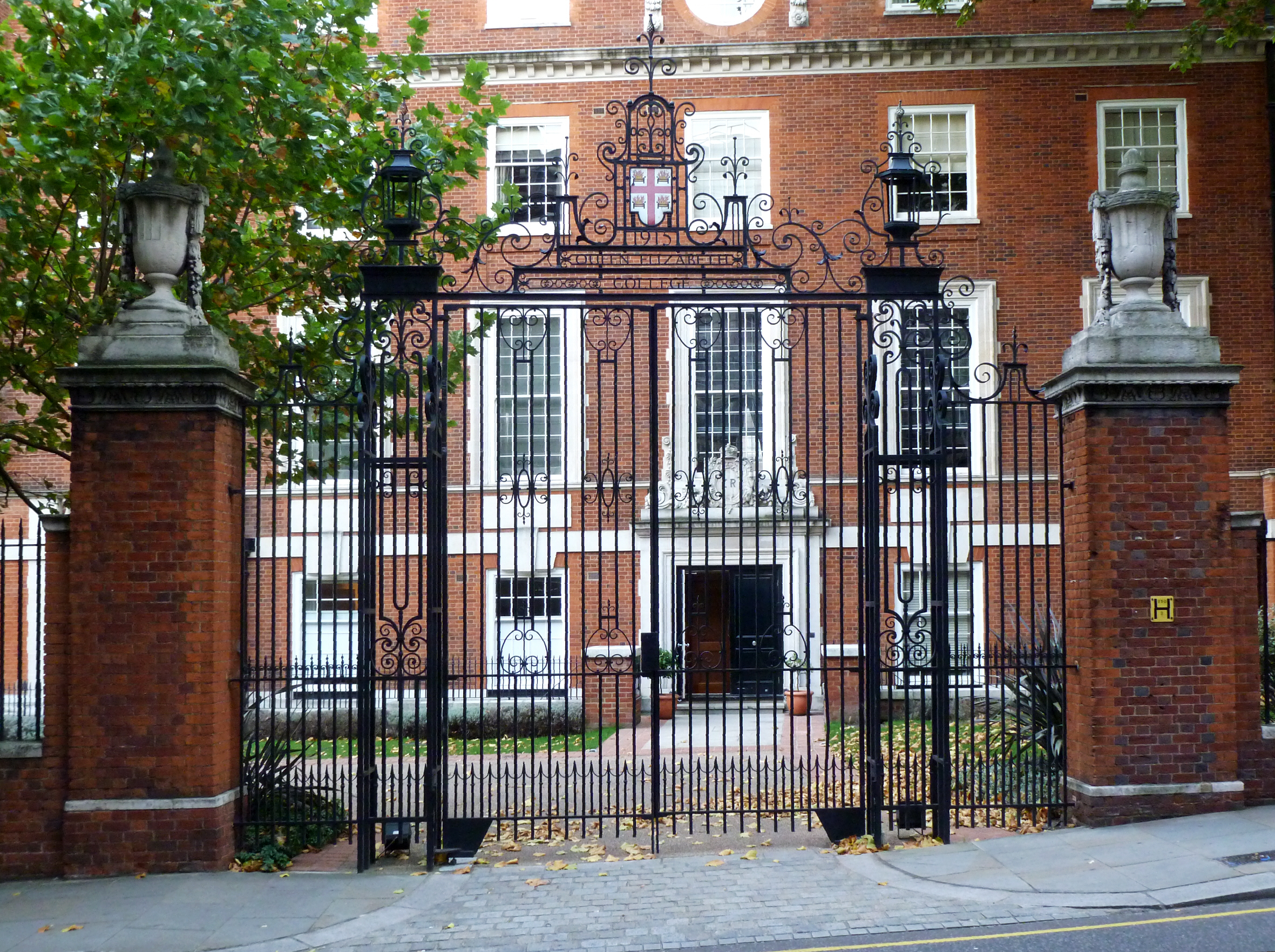
Former College building in Campden Hill Road (gates dated 1915), now Academy Gardens

QEC reunited with King's College London in 1985, and the Kensington campus became associated with biomedical sciences. However, the campus was closed and sold in 2000 with the contents being decanted to the Franklin-Wilkins Building. Part of the campus has subsequently been converted into Academy Gardens, apartments which retain some QEC branding.

== College newsletter ==
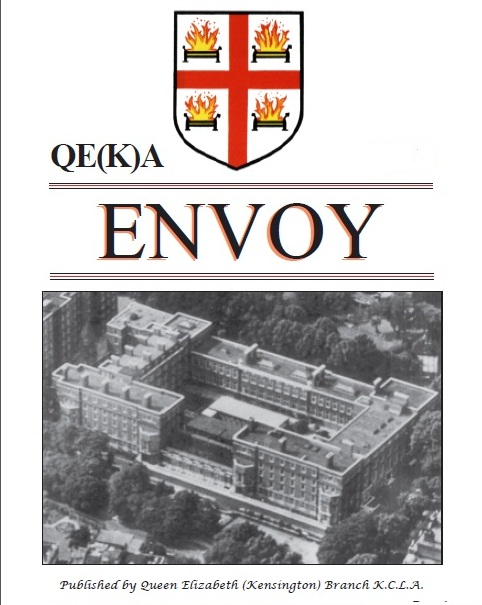
QE(K)A's Envoy Newsletter cover

Envoy is the annual newsletter of Queen Elizabeth College. The Queen Elizabeth College alumni/old student association organises a reunion every year.

== Academic staff ==
- William B. Bonnor, mathematician and gravitation physicist
- Emma Sophia Buchheim, German linguist
- Garth Chapman, academic, author and zoologist
- Alice Copping, nutritionist
- Christopher Dainty, physicist
- Alan Ebringer, immunologist
- Clara Knight, classicist
- K. Kunaratnam, physicist and academician
- John Yudkin, physiologist and nutritionist

== Notable alumni ==
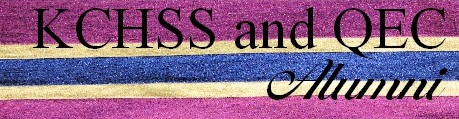
QE(K)A's Alumni insignia

- Radclyffe Hall, poet and author
- Penelope Jeggo, biologist
- Nancy Rothwell, physiologist and academician
- Devendra Prasad Gupta, botanist and academician
- Sheila Rodwell, nutritional epidemiologist
- Joel Mandelstam, microbiologist
- Qui-Lim Choo, co-discoverer of Hepatitis C and of the Hepatitis D genome
- Pegaret Anthony, artist
- Keith Campbell, biologist
- Paulette Clancy
