= Clara Knight =

Clara Knight may refer to

- Clara "Allah" Knight (1879–1946), nanny to the British royal family
- Clara Knight (died 1950), English classicist
