= Ngor (disambiguation) =

Ngor is a monastery in the Ü-Tsang province of Tibet.

Ngor may also refer to:

- Ngor, Dakar, a commune of Senegal
- Ngor (island), an island belonging to this commune
- A Cambodian Hakka Romanization of the surname 吳, known as Ng or Wu
- Ngor Royal Cup, lowest level of club football competition which competed in the tournament in Thailand since 1963
- Ngor Okpala, a Local Government Area of Imo State, Nigeria

== See also ==
- Ngo (disambiguation)
