= Sydney Brenner =

South African biologist and Nobel prize winner (1927–2019)

Sydney Brenner CH FRS FMedSci MAE
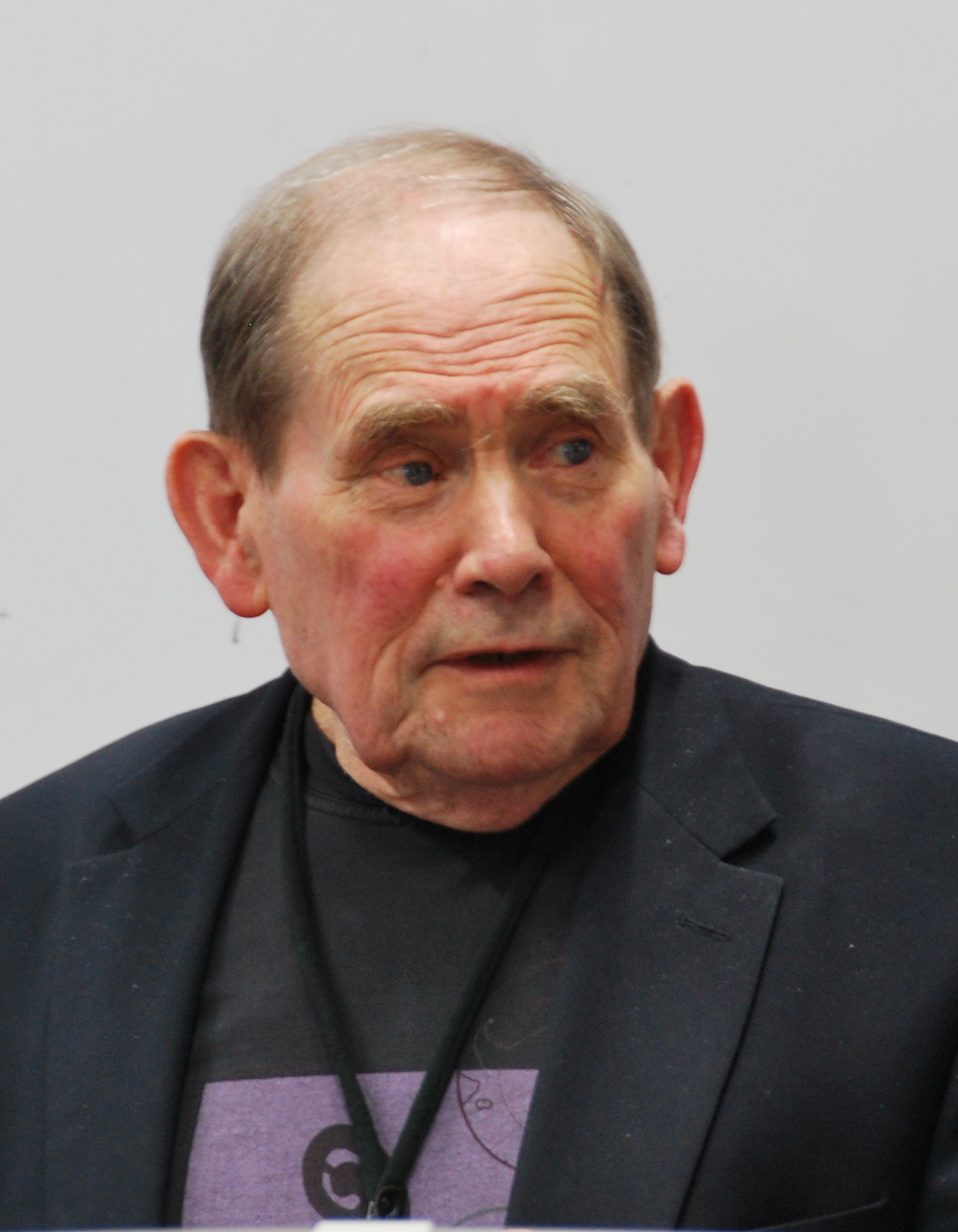
- Brenner in 2008
- Born: 13 January 1927; Germiston, Transvaal, South Africa
- Died: 5 April 2019 (aged 92); Singapore
- Other name: Uncle Syd
- Education: University of the Witwatersrand (MSc, MBBCh); University of Oxford (DPhil)
- Known for: Genetics of Caenorhabditis elegans
- Spouse: May Covitz (m. 1952; died 2010)
- Children: 3
- Awards: William Bate Hardy Prize (1969); Mendel Medal (1970); Albert Lasker Medical Research Award (1971); Royal Medal (1974); Gairdner Foundation International Award (1978); Krebs Medal (1980); Rosenstiel Award (1986); Louis-Jeantet Prize for Medicine (1987); Harvey Prize (1987); Genetics Society of America Medal (1987); Kyoto Prize (1990); Copley Medal (1991); Gairdner Foundation International Award (1991); King Faisal International Prize in Medicine (1992); Max Delbrück Medal (1994); Novartis-Drew Award (2001); Nobel Prize in Physiology or Medicine (2002); Dan David Prize (2002)
- Scientific career
- Fields: Biology
- Workplaces: University of the Witwatersrand; University of Cambridge; University of California, Berkeley; Molecular Sciences Institute; Scripps Research Institute; Salk Institute for Biological Studies; Howard Hughes Medical Institute; Laboratory of Molecular Biology; Okinawa Institute of Science and Technology
- Thesis: The physical chemistry of cell processes: a study of bacteriophage resistance in Escherichia coli, strain B (1954)
- Doctoral advisor: Cyril Hinshelwood
- Doctoral students: Gerald M. Rubin; John G. White

Sydney Brenner (13 January 1927 – 5 April 2019) was a South African biologist. In 2002, he shared the Nobel Prize in Physiology or Medicine with H. Robert Horvitz and Sir John E. Sulston. Brenner made significant contributions to work on the genetic code, and other areas of molecular biology while working in the Medical Research Council (MRC) Laboratory of Molecular Biology in Cambridge, England. He established the roundworm Caenorhabditis elegans as a model organism for the investigation of developmental biology, and founded the Molecular Sciences Institute in Berkeley, California, United States.

== Education and early life ==
Brenner was born in the town of Germiston in the then Transvaal (today in Gauteng), South Africa, on 13 January 1927. His parents, Leah (née Blecher) and Morris Brenner, were Jewish immigrants. His father, a cobbler, migrated to South Africa from Lithuania in 1910, and his mother from Riga, Latvia, in 1922. He had one sister, Phyllis and also one brother, Isaac.

He was educated at Germiston High School and the University of the Witwatersrand. Having joined the university at the age of 15, it was noted during his second year that he would be too young to qualify for the practice of medicine at the conclusion of his six-year medical course, and he was therefore allowed to complete a Bachelor of Science degree in Anatomy and Physiology. During this time he was taught physical chemistry by Joel Mandelstam, microscopy by Alfred Oettle and neurology by Harold Daitz. He also received an introduction to anthropology and paleontology from Raymond Dart and Robert Broom. The histologist Joseph Gillman and director of research in the Anatomy Department persuaded Brenner to continue towards an honours degree and beyond towards an MSc. Brenner accepted though this would mean he would not graduate from medical school and his bursary (scholarship) would be discontinued. He supported himself during this time by working as a laboratory technician. It was during this time, in 1945, that Brenner would publish his first scientific works. His masters thesis was in the field of cytogenetics and publications during this time in the field Brenner would later call Cell Physiology.

In 1946 Wilfred Le Gros Clark invited Brenner to his Department of Anatomy in Oxford, during a visit to South Africa. Brenner was persuaded to finish his medical education instead. Brenner returned to medical school where he failed Medicine, nearly failed Surgery and achieved a First Class in Obstetrics and Gynecology. Six months later Brenner had finished repeating Medicine and Surgery and in 1951 received the degrees of Bachelor of Medicine, Bachelor of Surgery (MBBCh).

Brenner received an 1851 Exhibition Scholarship from the Royal Commission for the Exhibition of 1851 which enabled him to complete a Doctor of Philosophy (DPhil) degree at the University of Oxford as a postgraduate student of Exeter College, Oxford, supervised by Cyril Hinshelwood.

== Career and research ==
Following his DPhil, Brenner did postdoctoral research at the University of California, Berkeley. He spent the next 20 years at the Laboratory of Molecular Biology in Cambridge. There, during the 1960s, he contributed to molecular biology, then an emerging field. In 1976 he joined the Salk Institute in California.

Together with Jack Dunitz, Dorothy Hodgkin, Leslie Orgel, and Beryl M. Oughton, he was one of the first people in April 1953 to see the model of the structure of DNA, constructed by Francis Crick and James Watson; at the time he and the other scientists were working at the University of Oxford's Chemistry Department. All were impressed by the new DNA model, especially Brenner, who subsequently worked with Crick in the Cavendish Laboratory at the University of Cambridge and the newly opened Medical Research Council (MRC) Laboratory of Molecular Biology (LMB). According to Beryl Oughton, later Rimmer, they all travelled together in two cars once Dorothy Hodgkin announced to them that they were off to Cambridge to see the model of the structure of DNA.

Brenner made several seminal contributions to the emerging field of molecular biology in the 1960s (see Phage group). The first was to prove that all overlapping genetic coding sequences were impossible. This insight separated the coding function from structural constraints as proposed in a clever code by George Gamow. This led Francis Crick to propose the concept of a hypothetical molecule (later identified as transfer RNA or tRNA) that transfers the genetic information from RNA to proteins. Brenner gave the name "adaptor hypothesis" in 1955. The physical separation between the anticodon and the amino acid on a tRNA is the basis for the unidirectional flow of information in coded biological systems. This is commonly known as the central dogma of molecular biology, i.e. information flows from nucleic acid to protein and never from protein to nucleic acid. Following this adaptor insight, Brenner conceived of the concept of messenger RNA during an April 1960 conversation with Crick and François Jacob, and together with Jacob and Matthew Meselson went on to prove its existence later that summer. Then, with Crick, Leslie Barnett, and Richard Watts-Tobin, Brenner genetically demonstrated the triplet nature of the code of protein translation through the Crick, Brenner, Barnett, Watts-Tobin et al. experiment of 1961, which discovered frameshift mutations. Brenner collaborating with Sarabhai, Stretton and Bolle in 1964, using amber mutants defective in the bacteriophage T4D major head protein, showed that the nucleotide sequence of the gene is co-linear with the amino acid sequence of the encoded polypeptide chain.

Together with the decoding work of Marshall Warren Nirenberg and others, the discovery of the triplet nature of the genetic code was critical to deciphering the code. Barnett helped set up Sydney Brenner's laboratory in Singapore, many years later.

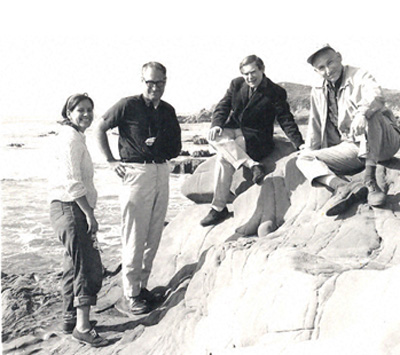
Esther Lederberg, Gunther Stent, Sydney Brenner and Joshua Lederberg pictured in 1965

Brenner, with George Pieczenik, created the first computer matrix analysis of nucleic acids using TRAC, which Brenner continued to use. Crick, Brenner, Klug and Pieczenik returned to their early work on deciphering the genetic code with a pioneering paper on the origin of protein synthesis, where constraints on mRNA and tRNA co-evolved allowing for a five-base interaction with a flip of the anticodon loop, and thereby creating a triplet code translating system without requiring a ribosome. This model requires a partially overlapping code. The published scientific paper is extremely rare in that its collaborators include three authors who independently became Nobel laureates.

Brenner then focused on establishing a free-living roundworm Caenorhabditis elegans as a model organism for the investigation of animal development including neural development. He chose this 1-millimeter-long soil roundworm mainly because it is simple, is easy to grow in bulk populations, and turned out to be quite convenient for genetic analysis. One of the key methods for identifying important function genes was the screen for roundworms that had some functional defect, such as being uncoordinated, leading to the identification of new sets of proteins, such as the UNC proteins. For this work, he shared the 2002 Nobel Prize in Physiology or Medicine with H. Robert Horvitz and John Sulston. The title of his Nobel lecture in December 2002, "Nature's Gift to Science", is a homage to this nematode; in it, he considered that having chosen the right organism turned out to be as important as having addressed the right problems to work on. In fact, the C. elegans community has grown rapidly in recent decades with researchers working on a wide spectrum of problems.

Brenner founded the Molecular Sciences Institute in Berkeley, California in 1996. As of 2015 he was associated with the Salk Institute, the Institute of Molecular and Cell Biology, the Singapore Biomedical Research Council, the Janelia Farm Research Campus, and the Howard Hughes Medical Institute. In August 2005, Brenner was appointed president of the Okinawa Institute of Science and Technology. He was also on the Board of Scientific Governors at The Scripps Research Institute, as well as being Professor of Genetics there. A scientific biography of Brenner was written by Errol Friedberg in the US, for publication by Cold Spring Harbor Laboratory Press in 2010.

Known for his penetrating scientific insight and acerbic wit, Brenner, for many years, authored a regular column ("Loose Ends") in the journal Current Biology. This column was so popular that "Loose ends from Current Biology", a compilation, was published by Current Biology Ltd. and became a collector's item. Brenner wrote "A Life in Science", a paperback published by BioMed Central. He is also noted for his generosity with ideas and the great number of students and colleagues his ideas have stimulated.

In 2017, Brenner co-organized a seminal lecture series in Singapore describing ten logarithmic scales of time from the Big Bang to the present, spanning the appearance of multicellular life forms, the evolution of humans, and the emergence of language, culture and technology. Prominent scientists and thinkers, including W. Brian Arthur, Svante Pääbo, Helga Nowotny and Jack Szostak, spoke during the lecture series. In 2018, the lectures were adapted into a popular science book titled Sydney Brenner's 10-on-10: The Chronicles of Evolution, published by Wildtype Books.

Brenner also gave four lectures on the history of molecular biology, its impact on neuroscience and the great scientific questions that lie ahead. The lectures were adapted into the book, In the Spirit of Science: Lectures by Sydney Brenner on DNA, Worms and Brains.

=== American plan and European plan ===
The "American plan" and "European plan" were proposed by Sydney Brenner as competing models for the way brain cells determine their neural functions. According to the European plan (sometimes referred to as the British plan), the function of cells is determined by their genetic lineage. According to the American plan, a cell's function is determined by the function of its neighbours after cell migration. Further research has shown that most species follow some combination of these methods, albeit in varying degrees, to transfer information to new cells.

== Awards and honours ==
Brenner received numerous awards and honours, including:

- Fellow of King's College, Cambridge since 1959.
- William Bate Hardy Prize in 1969.
- Albert Lasker Medical Research Award in 1971.
- Royal Medal from the Royal Society in 1974.
- Gairdner Foundation International Award in 1978 and again in 1991.
- Krebs Medal in 1980.
- Novartis Medal and Prize of the Biochemical Society in 1980.
- Rosenstiel Award in 1986.
- Member of the Order of the Companions of Honour in 1986.
- Harvey Prize in 1987.
- Genetics Society of America Medal in 1987.
- Kyoto Prize in 1990.
- Copley Medal in 1991.
- King Faisal International Prize in Medicine in 1992.
- The Dendrobium Sydney Brenner named in 1998 on the occasion of his visit to Singapore's National Orchid Garden the prior year.
- Nobel prize in Physiology or Medicine in 2002.
- Dan David Prize in 2002. directed by Professor Gad Barzilai
- March of Dimes Prize in Developmental Biology in 2002.
- In recognition of his pioneering role in starting what is now a global research community that work on C. elegans, another closely related nematode was given the scientific name Caenorhabditis brenneri.
- The National Science and Technology Medal by the Agency for Science, Technology and Research awarded Brenner in 2006 for his distinguished and strategic contributions to the development of Singapore's scientific capability and culture, particularly in the biomedical sciences sector.
- In 2008, the University of the Witwatersrand named the Sydney Brenner Institute for Molecular Bioscience (SBIMB) in his honour.
- Grand Cordon of the Order of the Rising Sun in 2017.
- In 2019, a newly discovered species of bobtail squid, Euprymna brenneri, was named in his honour.

== Personal life ==
Brenner was married to May Brenner (née Covitz, subsequently Balkind) from December 1952 until her death in January 2010; their children include Belinda, Carla, Stefan, and his stepson Jonathan Balkind from his wife's first marriage to Marcus Balkind. He lived in Ely, Cambridgeshire. He was an atheist.

Brenner died on 5 April 2019, in Singapore, at the age of 92.

== See also ==
- List of Jewish Nobel laureates
