= Buchheim (disambiguation) =

Buchheim is a municipality in Baden-Württemberg, Germany

Buchheim may also refer to:

== People ==
- Buchheim (surname)

== Places ==
- Buchheim, Cologne, Germany
- The former name of Bad Lausick
