= Lefteri H. Tsoukalas =

Lefteri H. Tsoukalas is a professor of engineering and founding director of the AI Systems Lab (AISL) at Purdue University. He has served as head of the School of Nuclear Engineering of Purdue University and as Chairman of the United States Nuclear Engineering Department Heads Organization.

Tsoukalas holds a PhD from the University of Illinois at Urbana–Champaign (1989). He has over 250 research publications on intelligent systems and control methodologies, more than three decades of experience in these fields, and is the principal author of the book Fuzzy and Neural Approaches in Engineering (John Wiley & Sons, New York, 1997).

Dr. Tsoukalas has served in advisory and consulting positions for the International Atomic Energy Agency (IAEA); the Agency for Science, Technology and Research (ASTAR) of the Government of Singapore; and the United States Department of Energy. He has been recognized by being inducted to the status of Fellow of the American Nuclear Society and awarded with the Humboldt Prize, Germany's highest honor for international scientists.
