= Joel Mandelstam =

British microbiologist (1919–2008)

- Born: 13 November 1919; Johannesburg, South Africa
- Died: 20 December 2008 (aged 89)
- Education: University of the Witwatersrand
- Scientific career
- Fields: Microbiology
- Workplaces: University of the Witwatersrand; Queen Elizabeth College

Joel Mandelstam FRS (13 November 1919 – 20 December 2008) was a British microbiologist, a professor, at the University of Oxford, and a Fellow of Linacre College, Oxford. He was a pioneer in using bacteria to study fundamental biological phenomena — such as development, differentiation, and the turnover of macromolecules — which had more usually been investigated in higher organisms.

Born in Johannesburg, and educated at the Jeppe High School for Boys, his parents were Lithuanian Jews. He attended the University of the Witwatersrand, where he read for an honours BSc degree. After graduating in 1942, he worked as a research assistant at the Medical school in Johannesburg. Amongst others, he taught Sydney Brenner there.

He came to London in 1947 to work for a PhD under John Yudkin at King's College of Household and Social Science in London (which became Queen Elizabeth College in 1953). From 1966 until his retirement in 1987 he was Iveagh Professor of Chemical Microbiology at the University of Oxford, where he built up a highly successful research group studying spore formation in bacteria.

== Positions held ==
- Research assistant, University of the Witwatersrand Medical school, 1943–1947
- Lecturer, Queen Elizabeth College, London, 1947–51
- Scientific staff, National Institute for Medical Research, 1952–66
- Iveagh Professor of Microbiology, and Fellow of Linacre College, University of Oxford, 1966–87
- Departmental demonstrator, Sir William Dunn School of Pathology, University of Oxford, 1987–90
- Fulbright Fellow, US, 1958–59
- Visiting professor, University of Adelaide, 1971
