= Paulette Clancy =

British materials scientist and academic

- Born: London
- Education: Queen Elizabeth College; University of Oxford
- Scientific career
- Fields: Chemical engineering
- Workplaces: Cornell University; Johns Hopkins University; University of London
- Thesis: Molecular interactions (1977)
- Website: www.cheme.cornell.edu/faculty-directory/paulette-clancy

Paulette Clancy is a British materials scientist who is Professor of Chemical and Biomolecular Engineering at Johns Hopkins University. Her research investigates the development of machine learning strategies to advance innovation in materials design, with a focus on complex situations.

== Early life and education ==
Clancy is from London. She was an undergraduate student at Queen Elizabeth College, where she studied chemistry. She moved to the University of Oxford for her doctoral research in physical chemistry.

== Research and career ==
Clancy was a postdoctoral researcher at both Cornell University and the University of London. While at Cornell, she bought a Chevrolet Camaro and drove all around North America. She returned to the United Kingdom, where she worked for an oil company.

In 1987, Clancy joined the faculty at Cornell University. She spent over thirty years at Cornell, eight as the Director of the Computational Science and Engineering and Bodman Chair of Chemical Engineering. Clancy founded the Women in Science community at Cornell, and has advocated for equity and inclusion throughout her career. She joined the faculty at the Whiting School of Engineering in 2018, and was appointed the Edward J. Schaefer Professor in 2023.

Clancy's research investigates the use of computational materials science. She looks to understand the relationship between atomic structure and material properties. At Johns Hopkins University, she leads the Data Science and AI Initiative. Her research involves computational simulations of semiconducting materials, include inorganic (e.g. silicon and germanium) and molecular systems. She is interested in the simulation of complex organic systems (e.g. antibacterial oligomers and covalent organic frameworks), understanding processes involved during nucleation and crystal growth, and the development of large-scale models for materials innovation (machine learning, force fields, Bayesian optimisation).

=== Awards and honours ===
- Alice Cook Award
- Cornell University Zellman Warhaft Award
- Elected to the AlChE board of directors
- Elected a Fellow of the American Institute of Chemical Engineers (AIChE)
- Elected to the advisory board of Materials Horizons

=== Selected publications ===
- Ruiz, Ricardo; Devashish Choudhary; Bert Nickel; Toccoli, Tullio; Kee-Chul Chang; Alex C. Mayer; Paulette Clancy; Jack M. Blakely; Randall L. Headrick; Iannotta, Salvatore; George G. Malliaras (2004). "Pentacene Thin Film Growth". Chemistry of Materials. 16 (23): 4497–4508. doi:10.1021/cm049563q. Wikidata Q63648678.
- Eric L Spitler; Brian T Koo; Jennifer L Novotney; John W Colson; Fernando J Uribe-Romo; Gregory D Gutierrez; Paulette Clancy; William Dichtel (2011). "A 2D covalent organic framework with 4.7-nm pores and insight into its interlayer stacking". Journal of the American Chemical Society. 133 (48): 19416–19421. doi:10.1021/ja206242v. PMID 22014294. Wikidata Q82115878.
- Cook SJ; Clancy P (1993). "Comparison of semi-empirical potential functions for silicon and germanium". Physical Review B. 47 (13): 7686–7699. doi:10.1103/physrevb.47.7686. PMID 10004775. Wikidata Q74374629.
