= Buchheim (surname) =

Buchheim (German pronunciation: [ˈbuːxˌhaɪ̯m]) is a German surname. Notable people with the surname include:

- Elfriede Buchheim (1900–1995), German painter
- Emma Sophia Buchheim (1861–1951), English translator and educator
- Lothar-Günther Buchheim (1918–2007), German author and painter
- Michael Buchheim (born 1949), German sport shooter
- Ralf Buchheim (born 1983), German sport shooter
- Rudolf Buchheim (1820–1879), German pharmacologist
