= NGO (disambiguation) =

NGO is an abbreviation for non-governmental organization.

It also may refer to:

- Ngô (吴), a Vietnamese surname equivalent to Chinese name Ng or Wu
- Wu (surname), Ngo in Hokkien
- Ao (surname), Ngo in Cantonese
- Ngo, a district and a town in the Republic of the Congo
- .ngo, a file extension for an NG Linker Object (NGML) file
- New Gravitational-wave Observatory, a European Space Agency project
- Chūbu Centrair International Airport, IATA airport code designation
  - Nagoya Airfield, its former designation
- Not Going Out, a British sitcom
- National Grid Office, an entity in Singapore

== See also ==
- Nonprofit organization
