= Academy Gardens, London =

Residential building in Kensington, London, England

Coordinates: 51.503160°N 0.197622°W

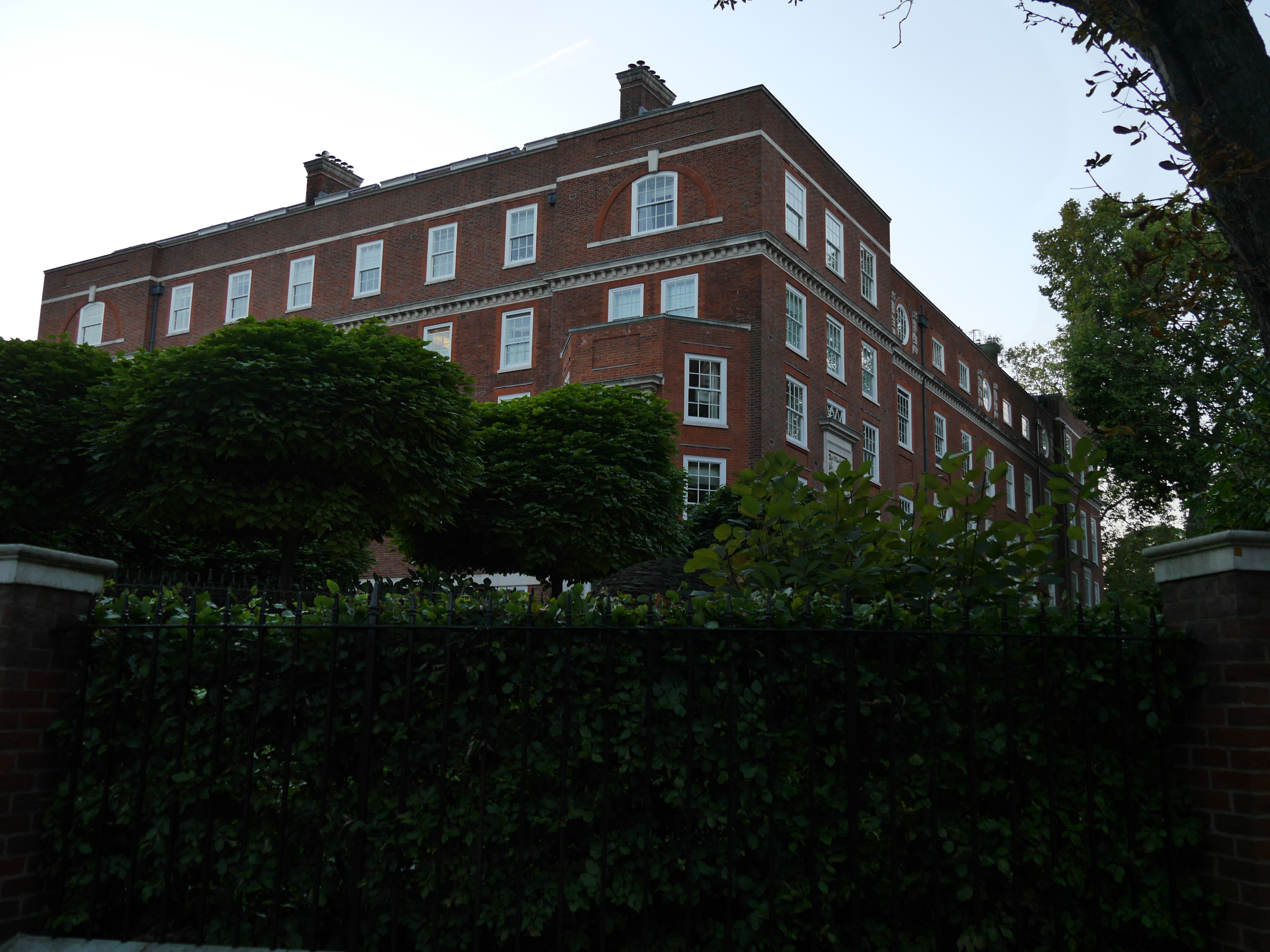
Academy Gardens, 2016

Academy Gardens is a Neo-Georgian apartment complex in Duchess of Bedford's Walk, Kensington, London W8. It was built in 1914 as Queen Elizabeth College, the Ladies' (later Women's) Department of King's College, London.

It was designed by H. Percy Adams and Charles Holden, and is Grade II listed.
