= Germiston =

Place in Gauteng, South Africa

Germiston kwaDukathole (Zulu)
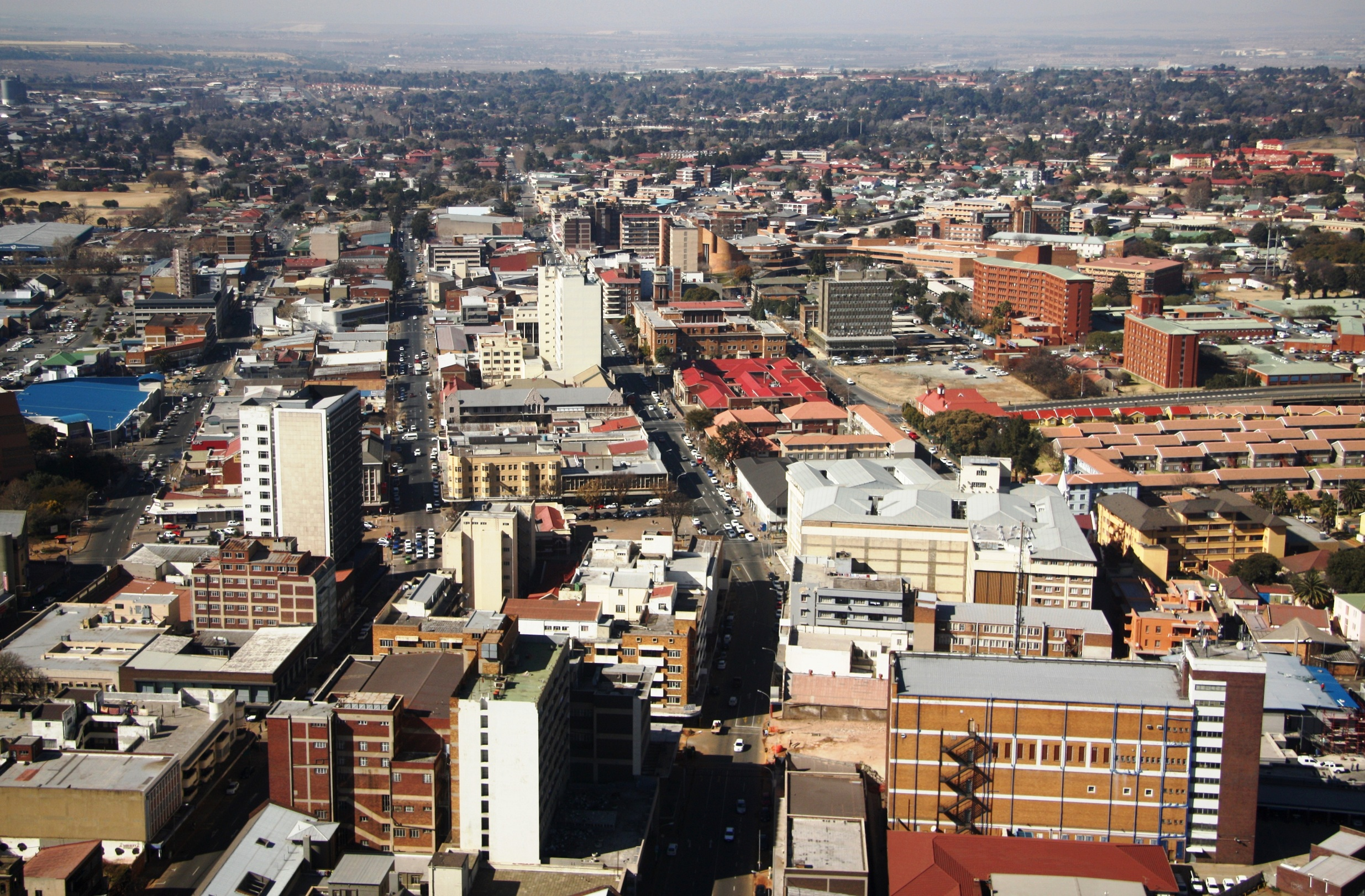
- The Central Business District of Germiston

- Location within Gauteng Location within South Africa
- Coordinates: 26°13′4″S 28°10′2″E
- Country: South Africa
- Province: Gauteng
- Municipality: Ekurhuleni
- Established: 1886

Area
  - Total: 143.27 km^{2} (55.32 sq mi)
- Elevation: 1,620 m (5,310 ft)

Population (2011)
  - Total: 255,863
  - Density: 1,785.9/km^{2} (4,625.4/sq mi)

Racial makeup (2011)
  - Black African: 62.3%
  - Coloured: 2.3%
  - Indian/Asian: 3.0%
  - White: 31.3%
  - Other: 1.1%

First languages (2011)
  - English: 24.3%
  - Afrikaans: 16.6%
  - Zulu: 16.6%
  - Xhosa: 9.4%
  - Other: 33.1%
- Time zone: UTC+2 (SAST)
- Postal code (street): 1401
- PO box: 1400
- Area code: 011

Germiston, also known as kwaDukathole, is a city in the East Rand region of Gauteng, South Africa, administratively forming part of the City of Ekurhuleni Metropolitan Municipality since the latter's establishment in 2000. It functions as the municipal seat of Ekurhuleni, hosting the municipal council and administration.

Originally a mining town established in 1886 at the start of the Witwatersrand Gold Rush, Germiston has since developed into one of the largest manufacturing, trucking and railway hubs in Africa, and is a major centre of the South African steel industry.

== History ==
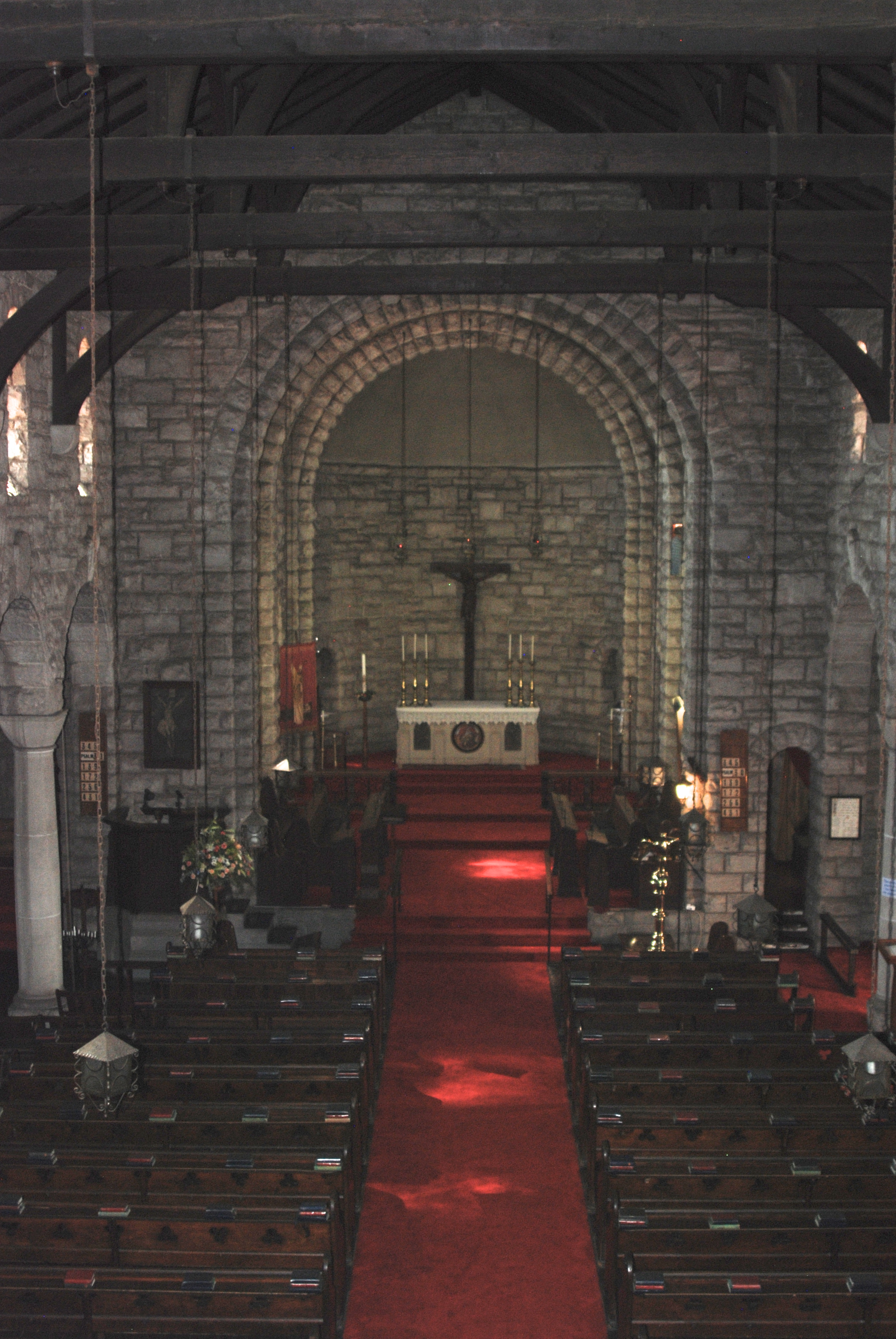
Interior of St Boniface Church

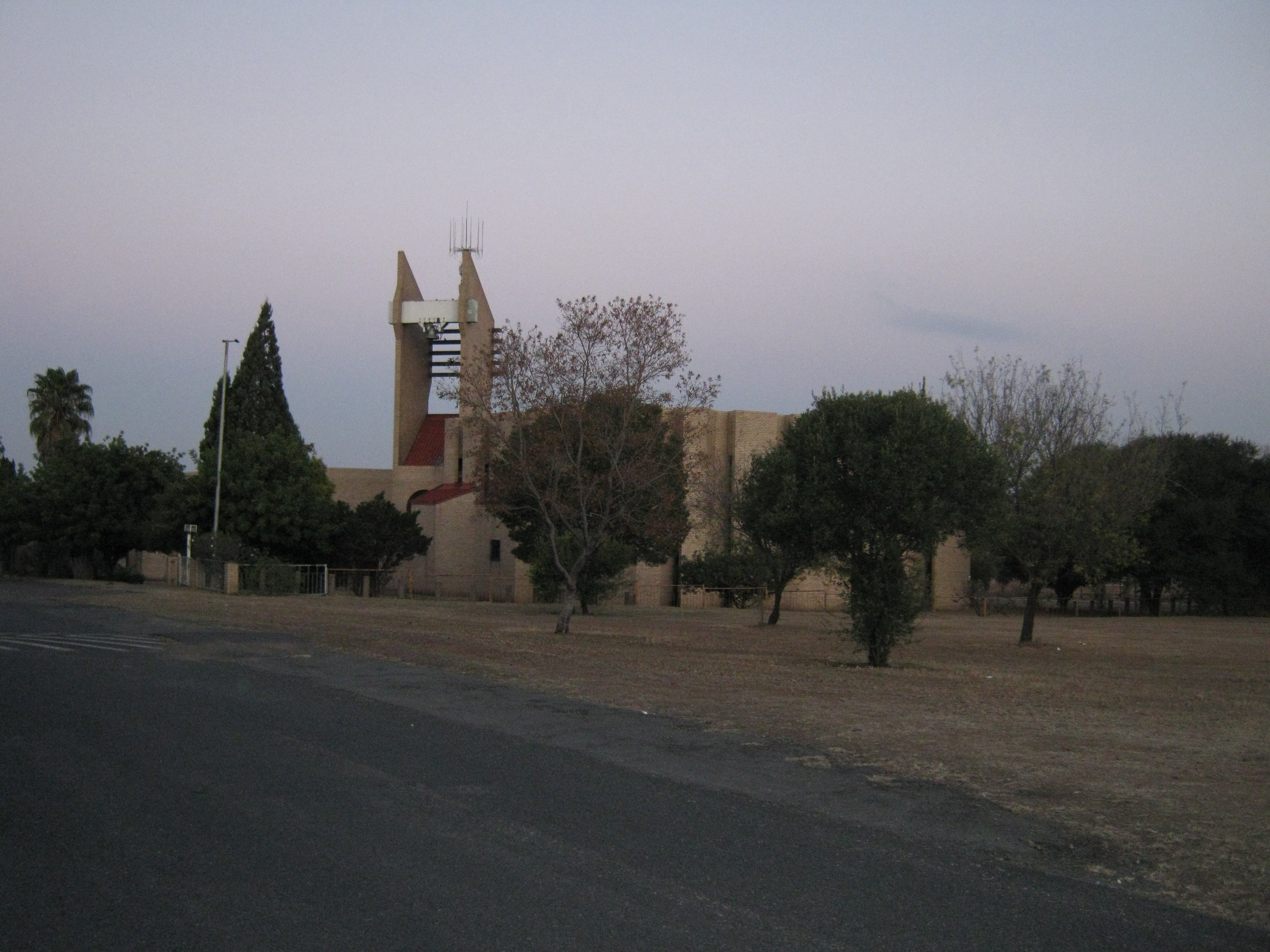
The third and current church housing the Gereformeerde Kerk Germiston

Germiston was established in the early days of the gold rush when two prospectors, John Jack from the farm of Germiston near Glasgow and August Simmer from Vacha in Germany, struck paydirt on the farm of Elandsfontein. In August 1886, the pair were on their way to the Eastern Transvaal when they outspanned (rested their pack animals) on the farm Elandsfontein and decided to stay and buy a half-interest in the farm. On 20 September 1886, Elandsfontein and the neighbouring farm Driefontein were proclaimed public diggings by the government of the South African Republic, and the town of Elandsfontein sprang up around the Simmer and Jack mine, centred on the township of Germiston (site of today's Germiston CBD), laid out by Simmer and Jack 2 km from the mine and named after Jack's father's farm. Both men made fortunes, and in 1904, after the Second Boer War, the town was renamed Germiston.

In 1921, the world's largest gold refinery, the Rand Refinery, was established at Germiston. Seventy percent of the western world's gold passes through this refinery. Although gold mining gradually wound down in Germiston, to the point that by the end of the 20th century it was no longer a mining centre, the Rand Refinery remains as busy as ever.

== Geography ==
=== Architecture ===
The city has a number of historic buildings. Among these are the St Andrew's Presbyterian Church which was built in 1905, and St Boniface Church designed by Sir Herbert Baker, which was built in 1910 (this is the second church on the site, as the Anglican Parish was founded in 1897). The church also houses the historic 1910 English Romantic Norman and Beard Organ.

The Alexander Hotel was also partly designed by Baker, using his traditional stone appearance. This building has recently been completely renovated and now houses a well-known law firm. The builder of the hotel, Alexander Stuart, some of whose descendants still live in Germiston, died when the RMS Lusitania was torpedoed in the First World War on 7 May 1915. The hotel thus remains a memorial to his pioneer work in the city over a hundred years ago.

=== Neighbourhoods ===
- Activia Park
- Albemarle
- Annex Park
- Barvallen
- Castleview
- Creston Hill
- Cruywagen Park
- Dania Park
- Dawnview
- Dewittsrus
- Delmenville
- Delmore
- Delville
- Denlee
- Dinwiddie
- Driehoek
- Dukathole
- Eduwin
- Elandsfontein
- Elandshaven
- Elsburg
- Elspark
- Estera
- Fishers Hill
- Geldenhuys
- Geldenhuys Sihs
- Georgetown
- Gerdview
- Germiston East
- Germiston North
- Germiston South
- Germiston West
- Golden Grove
- Golden Walk
- Gosforth Park
- Harmelia
- Hazeldean
- Hazelpark
- Henville
- Highway Gardens
- Homestead
- Industries East
- Industries West
- Jerusalem
- Junction Hill
- Jupiter
- Klippoortjie
- Klopperpark
- Knights
- La Lucia Gardens
- Lambton
- Lambton Gardens
- Leondale
- Magagula
- Makausi
- Malvern East
- Marlands
- Meadowbrook
- Meadowdale
- Mimosa Park
- Norton
- Palmridge
- Parkhill Gardens
- Pharoe Park
- Phumula
- Phumula Gardens
- Pirowville
- Primrose
- Primrose East
- Primrose Hill
- Rand Airport
- Rondebult
- Roodebult
- Roodekop
- Rustivia
- Simmerfield
- Solheim
- Staatsdorp
- Sunnyridge
- Sunnyrock
- Symhurst
- Symridge
- Tedstoneville
- Tunney
- Union
- Wadeville
- Wannenberg
- Wannenberghoogte
- Webber
- Woodmere
- Wychwood

== Demographics ==
According to the 2001 census, the population of Germiston consisted of 139,719 people living in 49,062 households, and its land area was 129 square kilometres (50 sq mi). Of this population, 49.8% described themselves as "White", 46.8% as "Black African", 1.9% as "Coloured", and 1.5% as "Indian or Asian". No language was predominant, with the breakdown of first languages being as follows:

Afrikaans	27.3%
English	26.0%
Zulu	13.2%
Xhosa	10.2%
Northern Sotho	6.6%
Southern Sotho	6.1%
Tsonga	3.2%
Tswana	2.1%
Venda	1.7%
Swazi	1.2%
Ndebele	0.6%
Other languages	1.8%

== Economy ==
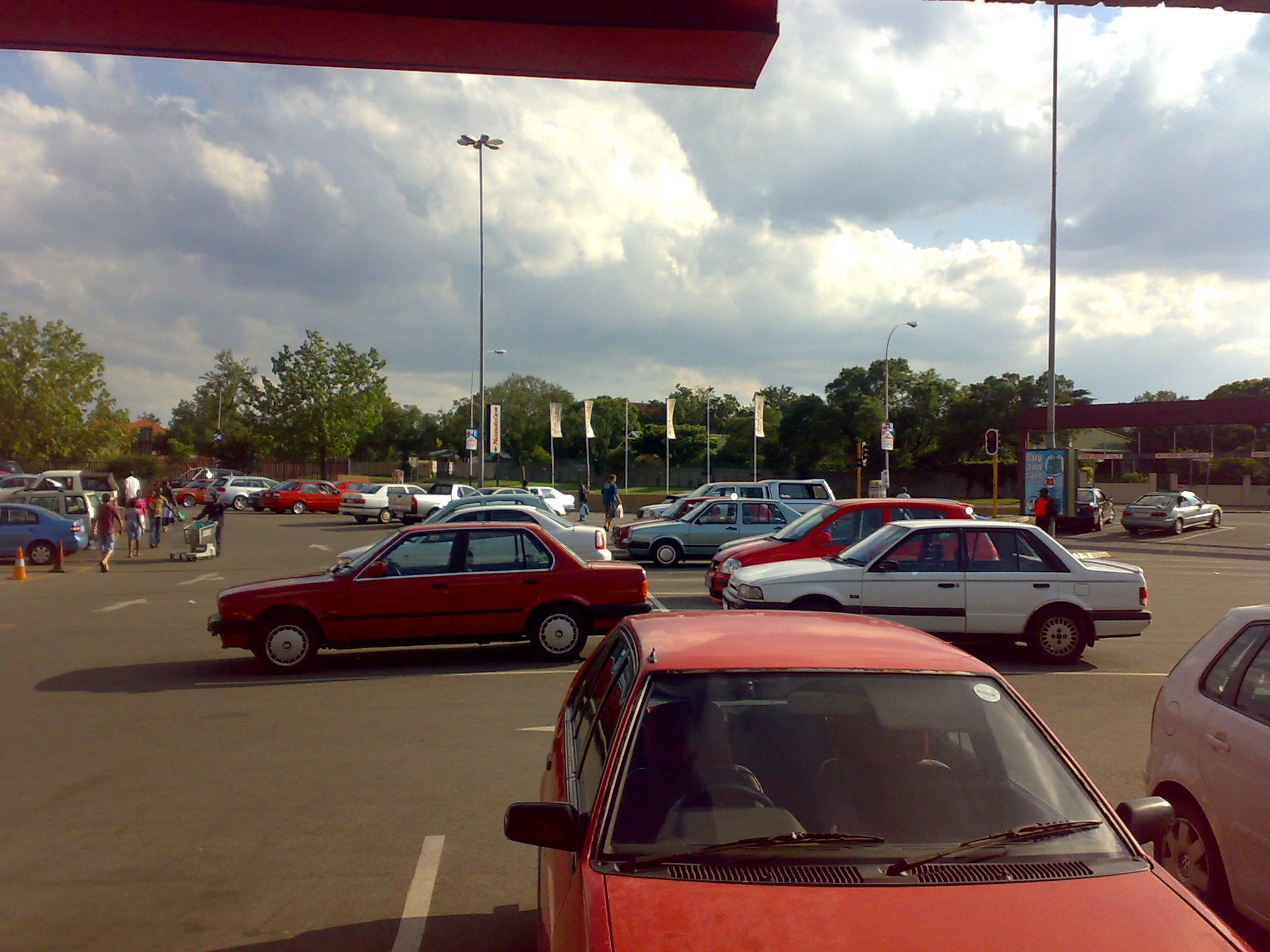
Supermarket car park in Parkhill Gardens, Germiston (2007)

South African Airways moved its head office from Durban to Rand Airport in Germiston on 1 July 1935. It later moved the offices first to Johannesburg, then to Kempton Park. The city is an industrial centre with steel manufacture and distribution being the largest industries. It has large railway workshops, a large glassworks, engineering companies, gas distribution firms, and many other heavy and light industries.

== Sports ==
Victoria Lake is better known today simply as Germiston Lake, however, the famous Sailing and Rowing Club retains the name of the Victoria Lake Club. The club is home to some of the best canoeists and rowing crews in the country, including the twenty-time South African School Champions, St Benedict's College. The lake is very popular at weekends for water-skiing and regattas. The lake grounds have recently been re-landscaped and the braai areas and shelters rebuilt.

The WesBank Raceway motorsports facility was located in the city, but it was sold to industrial estate developers in November 2007. The Raceway was formerly the Gosforth Park Race Club, one of the major horse racing facilities in Gauteng. Germiston Stadium (formerly the Herman Immelman Stadium) is also located in the city. This is also the home ground for the Germiston Simmer Rugby Club and has a tartan track for athletics.

== Law and government ==
=== Government ===
==== Coats of arms ====
- Municipal (1)

By 1931, the Germiston municipality had assumed a pseudo-heraldic coat of arms, depicting (1) buck in the veld, (2) a scene showing mineshafts, (3) a railway train in a landscape, and (4) a half-tented ox-wagon in a landscape, the quarters separated by a red cross. The motto was Salus populi suprema lex.

- Municipal (2)

A proper coat of arms was granted by the College of Arms in August 1935. It was registered with the Transvaal Provincial Administration in August 1963 and at the Bureau of Heraldry in February 1968.

The arms were: Gules, within two bendlets Or between two ox wagons Argent, three bezants (i.e. a red shield displaying three gold coins between two diagonal gold lines between two ox-wagons).

The crest was a rising falcon (representing Rand Airport); the supporters were two eland, each resting a foot on an heraldic fountain (a white and blue striped disc); the motto was Salus populi suprema lex.

== Infrastructure ==
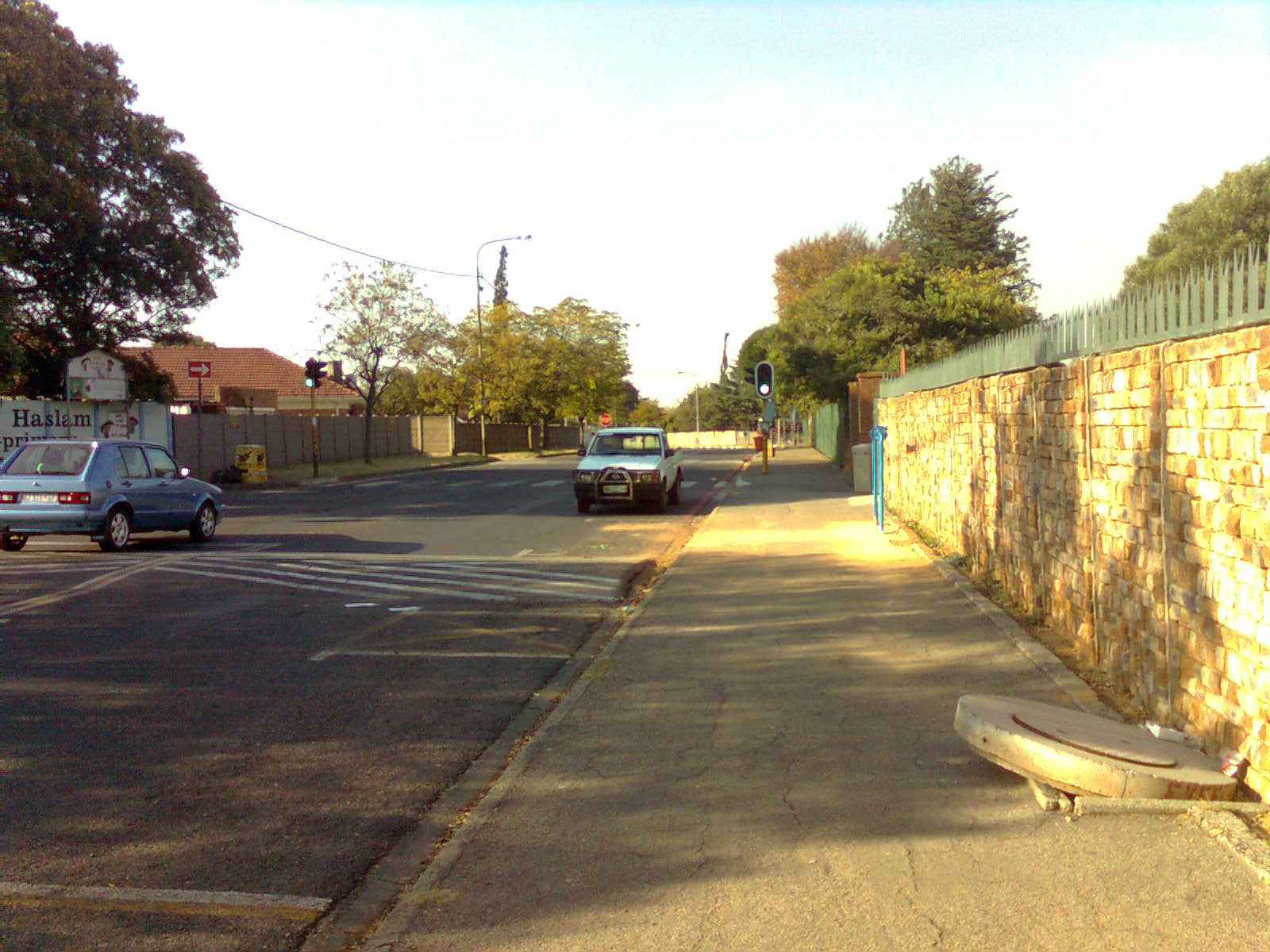
A street in Germiston

=== Transportation ===
==== Roads ====
Germiston is well-connected to five major freeways or motorways that service the Greater Johannesburg region. These include to the west of Germiston, the M2 motorway that connects to the southern Johannesburg CBD, the N3 Eastern Bypass and the N12 South; On the southern side, the N17 and N3 and in the north, the N12 East and the R24 service the city.

==== Railways ====
Being a mining and industrial city, Germiston is serviced by passenger rail and the CBD has several stations, the main one being Germiston Station. The industrial areas are serviced by rail spurs and stations and the Transnet has a large depot north of the CBD in Keswick Road.

==== Airports ====
Germiston is also the location of Rand Airport, at one time one of the busiest in Africa and the southern hemisphere. Today it caters largely for light aircraft and flying schools, but is also home to the South African Airways Museum. As a result of this, two of the earlier Boeing 747 Jumbo aircraft used by SAA now reside there on permanent display.

=== Health systems ===
Germiston is served by the Bertha Gxowa Hospital, a public state hospital. Other private hospitals include Life Roseacres Hospital in Primrose.

== Education ==
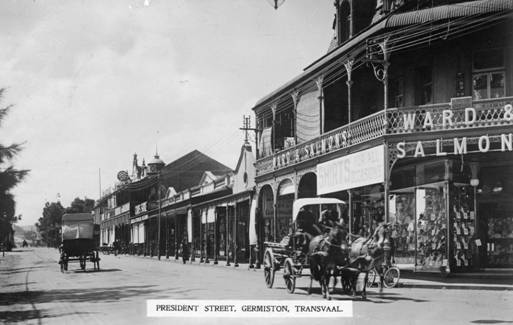
Old Germiston, c. 1910. President Street

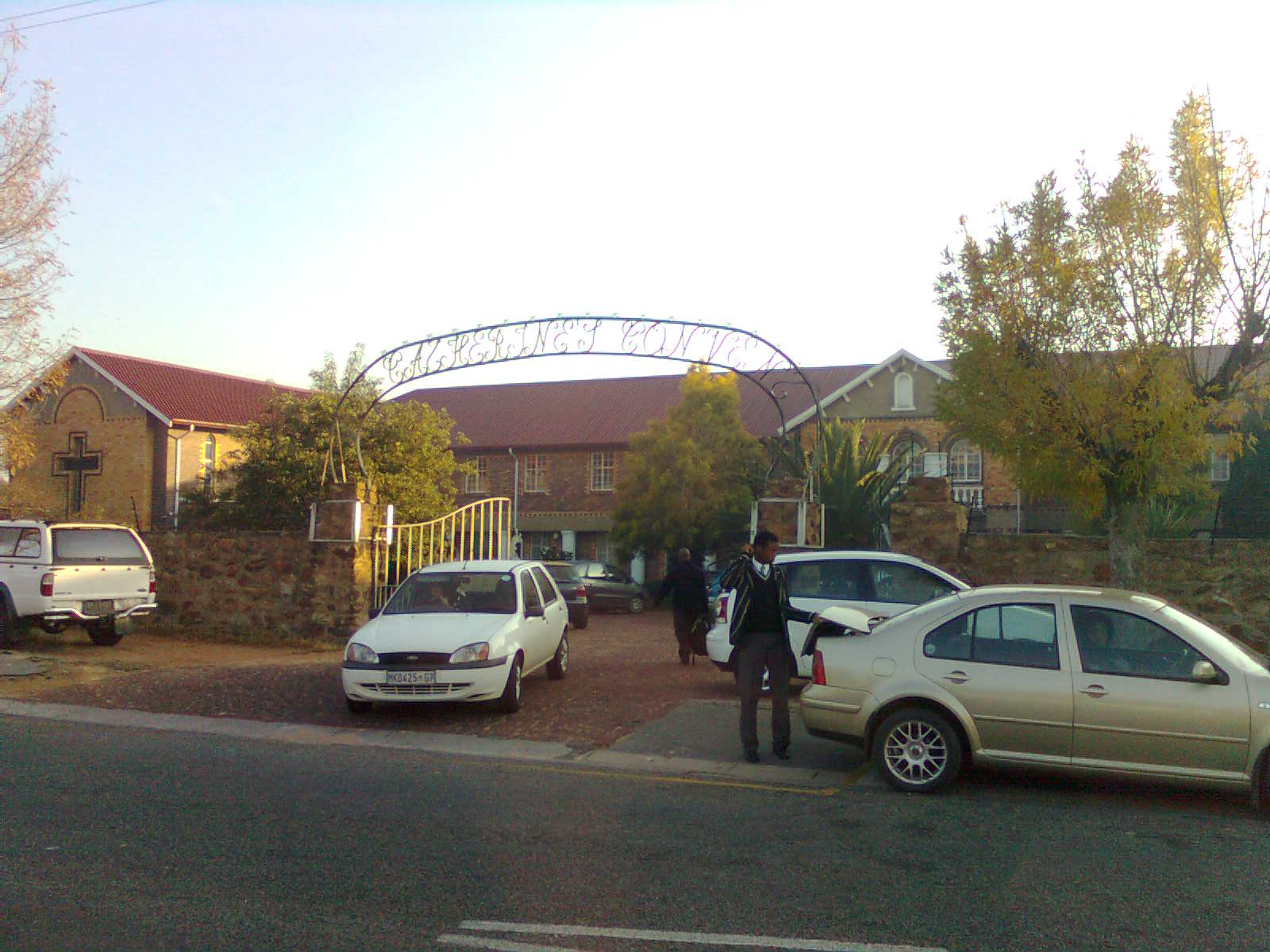
St Catherine's is the oldest convent in Germiston

The oldest high school in the city is part of the combined St Catherine's School, an independent Catholic school which was founded by the Dominican Sisters under the leadership of Mother Rose Nyland in the city centre in 1908. The school then relocated to Piercy Avenue in the suburb of Parkhill Gardens in the 1940s. Today it accommodates more than 600 pupils and is considered to be one of the leading private schools in Gauteng. Germiston High School was founded in 1917 alongside Victoria Lake; from the 1940s to 1963, the girls were based in Fourth Avenue in Lambton, at what was known as Germiston Girls' High School, whilst the boys remained at the 1917 campus as Germiston Boys' High School. In 1964, due to the need to relocate the Afrikaans Delville Primary School, the girls were moved back to combine with the boys in the original historic buildings. The school celebrated its centenary in 2017. Famous past pupils include Dr Sydney Brenner, winner of the 2002 Nobel Prize.

The Germiston Boys' High School cadet band was known throughout South Africa as one of the greatest school cadet bands ever to compete and parade in South Africa.The band started its success from the year 1952, running up to and including 1964. Often the band would record an average mark of 99 percent overall. (Music performance, drumming, bugle and trumpet ensemble, along with drill, dress and discipline).

The school boasted a very large and active music centre for a number of years, which grew largely due to the work of the late George Burgess. The various jazz and concert bands that were the product of the music centre recorded various long playing records, won awards in various Eisteddfods and national competitions and appeared on television. Sadly, due to education department budget restructuring, the music centre was closed. The school still enjoys the singing of an excellent choir.

The rowing club, which won the South African National Championships in 1980, is still flourishing, and the oarsmen and women compete at all the school regattas.

== Notable people ==
Notable people to come from Germiston include:

- Dr Sydney Brenner, winner of the 2002 Nobel Prize in Physiology or Medicine
- Hestrie Cloete, world champion in high jump
- Neville Colman, hematologist and DNA expert
- John Cundill, journalist and playwright
- Trevor Denman, an American sportscaster and public-address announcer specialising in thoroughbred horse racing
- Arlene Dickinson, South African-Canadian entrepreneur
- Ernie Els, golfer who attended Delville Primary School and Jan de Klerk High School.
- Malcolm Marx, South African rugby player (2019 & 2023 Rugby World Cup winner)
- Ted Grant, Trotskyist politician and theorist
- Bertha Gxowa, anti-apartheid and women's rights activist and trade unionist
- Pierre Issa, Lebanese South African former footballer
- Albert Johanneson, professional footballer and first black player to play in the FA Cup
- Bobby Locke, professional golfer, winner of four Open Championships
- David Quinn Mayne, pioneering systems engineer, Professor Emeritus at Imperial College London
- André Nel, South African cricket fast bowler
- Sir Hugh Saunders, air chief marshal
- Doug Serrurier, racing driver
- Stanley Skewes, mathematician
- Helen Suzman, anti-apartheid activist and politician
- Marie Warder, journalist who went on to champion the cause of hemochromatosis
