= Germiston High School =

Coordinates: 26°14′13″S 28°09′28″E

- Germiston High School, Rand Airport Road Germiston, Elandsfontein 108-Ir, Johannesburg, 2043

Information
- Former name: Secondary School Germiston South
- Motto: Scientia et Humanitas (Science and Culture)
- Established: 10 September 1917
- Founder: Mr. C.R Harding
- School district: Ekurhuleni West
- Principal: Ms R. Goosen
- Website: germistonhs.co.za

Germiston High School (established September 1917) is a South African English-medium government school based in Germiston, Gauteng.

== History ==
The school was established in 10 September 1917 by Mr R.C Harding. The schools first name was Secondary School Germiston which served as a unisex school till the boys and girls were separated. The school was housed temporarily in the building today occupied by Germiston South School. In April of the following year the school became known as the High School Germiston

A start was eventually made in 1922, and the building was officially opened by the Administrator of Transvaal on 1 August 1923. There was opposition to the site by many residents of Germiston who complained that it was too far out of town! Colours were selected in 1917 but there was difficulty in obtaining them because of the Great War, and for the same reason, when they were obtainable, they were not of a very good quality.

Mr R.J. Johnson became headmaster in 1919, a position he occupied until 1924, when he was succeeded by Mr F.N. Gammidge. At the beginning of the 1925 season, the school game was changed from soccer to "rugger", and during the same year the cadet detachment provided a guard of honour to the Prince of Wales, (later King Edward VIII) on his visit to Germiston. Mr W. Main succeeded Mr Gammidge in 1934 and was headmaster throughout the war years. Mr H.C. Robinson was the incumbent after Mr Main, serving as headmaster from 1946 until 1960.

At the beginning of the 1950s, the Transvaal Education Department (TED) decided to separate the boys and girls. In 1951 the girls moved to Lambton, to the building is today occupied by Delville Laerskool.

Miss E.B Bergen was then appointed headmistress, a position she occupied for the rest of the school's thirteen years existence

The Germiston Boys High School, under Mr Robinson, occupied the Lake Grounds building. Mr J. Lane, an old boy of Germiston High, took over the reins of office when Mr Robinson retired in 1960, and held this position until the end of 1963, when he left to take up the position of Headmaster of Greenside High.

== Sport ==
Germiston High School provides rugby, soccer, tennis, netball, basketball, chess, athletics and swimming matches which they participate with other schools in Ekurhuleni

=== Rugby ===
Under the administration of Golden Rugby Union, Germiston High have been known as the best team in the league. Their winning record is indomitable and they have been invited to many rugby tournaments in South Africa.

== School Subjects ==
The school offers the following subjects:

- English
- Mathematics and Mathematical Literacy
- Zulu language
- Afrikaans
- Economic Management Science
- Creative Arts
- Life Orientation
- PAT
- Technology
- Natural Sciences

== Notable alumni ==
- Sydney Brenner, winner of a Nobel Prize in Physiology or Medicine

== Academics ==
In November 2018 several Germiston High School students were invited to the Gauteng Province Mathematical Olympiad. These Germistonians received prizes for their results.
