= Penelope Jeggo =

British biologist (born 1947)

- Born: 1947 (age 78–79); Cambridge, England
- Education: Queen Elizabeth College, University of London; National Institute for Medical Research
- Known for: Double-stranded DNA repair
- Scientific career
- Fields: Cell biology
- Workplaces: University of Sussex

Penelope "Penny" Jeggo (born September 1947) is a noted British molecular biologist, best known for her work in understanding damage to DNA. She is also known for her work with DNA gene mutations. Her interest in DNA damage has inspired her to research radiation biology and radiation therapy and how radiation affects DNA. Jeggo has more than 170 publications that pertain to DNA damage, radiation, and cancer research and has received 3 top science awards/medals for her research. Jeggo has also been a member of several organizations that pertain to radiation biology; these organizations include Committee on Medical Aspects of Radiation in the Environment (COMARE), National Institute for Radiation Science laboratory researcher, and the Multidisciplinary European Low Dose Initiative (MELODI). Jeggo is a member of these organizations, and she is also an editor for several publication journals that are related to cancer and radiation biology. Jeggo is very passionate about her research and in an interview with Fiona Watt claimed that "Although my results contributed only the tiniest smidgeon to scientific knowledge, I gained immense satisfaction from it".

== Early life and education ==
Penny Jeggo was born in Cambridge, England. She earned a bachelor's degree in microbiology at Queen Elizabeth College, University of London in 1970. She went on to earn a PhD in genetics at the National Institute for Medical Research (NIMR), London, in the lab of Robin Holliday.

She later held postdoctoral positions with John Cairns, whom she cites as one of her biggest mentors, at the Imperial Cancer Research Fund Mill Hill Laboratory, and with Miroslav Radman at the Université libre de Bruxelles, Belgium. After working for Radman, Jeggo returned in 1980 to Robin Holliday's lab where she began her research on DNA damage and the cells' response to the damage. After more work in Radman's lab, Jeggo, in 1989, moved to the Cell Mutation Unit at Sussex.

When Jeggo reached her thirties, she and her husband started a family giving birth to a son, Matthew. Her husband died from colon cancer shortly after Matthew was born. The death of Matthew's father almost discouraged her from continuing her research in cancer and radiation biology. She returned to her research and further researched cancer and DNA a few years after her husband's death.

== Career and legacy ==
Jeggo's primary legacy is her work on DNA damage responses and DNA repair of double strand breaks. Much of her early work involved Chinese hamster ovary cells, a commonly studied cell line also known as CHO. Using standard techniques of microbial genetics, she tested more than 9,000 colonies before isolating six X-ray-sensitive mutants. This was the first step in understanding the mechanisms involved in the repair of X-irradiation-induced DNA damage.

Jeggo is particularly well known for identifying two components of an enzyme called DNA-dependent protein kinase (DNA-PK) as being important in DNA non-homologous end joining (NHEJ), a pathway by which mammalian cells repair themselves. This discovery was a major breakthrough in understanding the double strand break repair pathway in mammals. In addition, Jeggo showed that NHEJ is important for the development of the immune response. She also studied LIG4-mutant mice and how exposure to oxygen increases the number of double-stranded breaks due to the failure to repair DNA breaks.

== Positions and events ==
Penelope Jeggo has participated in various symposiums and conventions where she has discussed her research and given talks on cell biology in relation to radiation biology. In 2001, Jeggo became a founding member of the Genome Damage and Stability Center, a research center established at the University of Sussex. In 2002, Jeggo was a lecturer for the 6th Cancer/Genome Priority Seminar at the Nagasaki University. She discussed the importance of low-dose radiation and molecular cell biology. In 2003, Jeggo was given the title of Professorial Fellow of the University Sussex. She also attended the 2003 Gordon Research Conference on Genetic Toxicology as the conference chair.

In 2012, Jeggo was elected into the Academy of Medical Science Fellows along with 46 other British researchers for their dedication to research and for their contributions to the medical sciences. In 2014, she was the chair of the Scientific Advisory Board for the Ataxia-Telangiectasia Society. She was an invited speakers for the symposium on DNA damage response to radiation in 2015 at the International Congress of Radiation Research (ICRR).

Jeggo was scheduled to represent the United Kingdom as one of the keynote speakers at the World Congress on Medical Physics and Biomedical Engineering in Prague 2018.

== Awards ==
Jeggo has won the 2011 Penelope Jeggo Bacq and Alexander Award for her research with radiation biology and cancer. She was also the 2013 recipient of the United Kingdom Genome Stability Network medal for her research in DNA damage of the cell. Penelope Jeggo won her third award in 2013 for the Silvanus Thompson Medal from the British Institute of Radiology. Her third award was also for her research in radiation and DNA damage.

== Other research and publications ==
One of Jeggo's first publication was on her research with double stranded DNA break repair mutants and the effect it has on V(D)J recombination. She and her fellow researchers discovered that two mutants, xrs-6 and XR-1, play a role in restoring V(D)J recombination and were able to identify which genes are affected by DNA breakage.

In one publication, Jeggo worked with other researchers on the Ataxia telangiectasia and Rad3 related protein (ATR) and how mutation in ATR can damage DNA which consequently prevents cilia signaling. The team used zebrafish as a model organism in order to test the protein defect and its effects on cilia. Jeggo had researched this subject previously in 2003 when she and fellow scientists concluded that when ATR is exposed to UV radiation, caused a splice mutation in DNA which led to Seckel syndrome, a disorder that retards growth while the fetus develops in the uterus.

To continue her research on DNA damage, Jeggo studied aging and stem cells. She found that the inability of DNA Ligase IV to repair breaks in stem cell DNA contributes to the aging of our cells. Jeggo and her team found that breaks in the stem cell DNA come from genetics as well as environmental stress which inhibits the lifespan of stem cells and therefore contributes to aging.

Jeggo began researching epigenetic changes and the effects that epigenetics have on DNA repair. She found that a mutation in ataxia telangiectasia mutated kinase (ATM) causes damage to DNA and chromatin structure. Jeggo's review showed that nucleosomes are important in DNA repair. However, she claims that more research on the changes in chromatin structure is necessary to further understanding of DNA damage and repair mechanisms.
