= Molecular Sciences Institute =

US research institute

The Molecular Sciences Institute (MSI), now located in Milpitas, California was founded in Berkeley, California by Sydney Brenner in 1996. Its mission was to operate as an independent non-profit research laboratory that combined genomic experimentation with computer modeling. Current efforts include co-curricular STEAM programming for youth and quick launch strategies for products/technologies addressing global health. In the last few years, MSI has integrated into the startup community through providing research and development facilities and mentorship.

This organization has been supported by federal grants from the National Institutes of Health (NIH), the Defense Advanced Research Projects Agency (DARPA) and other funds provided by foundations and corporations.
