= Errol Friedberg =

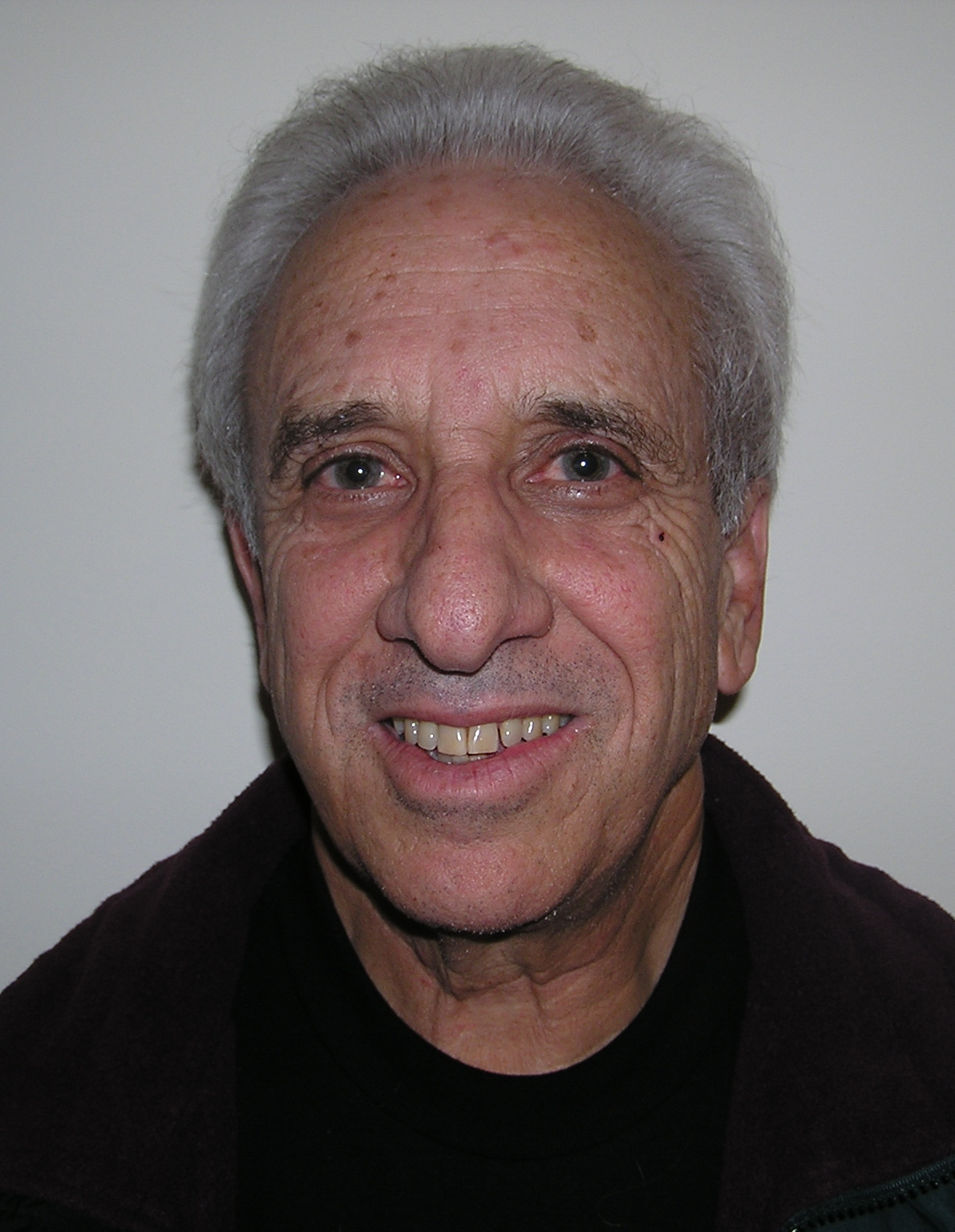
- Friedberg in 2003
- Born: Errol Clive Friedberg; October 2, 1937; Johannesburg, South Africa
- Died: March 31, 2023 (aged 85); Tennessee
- Education: University of Witwatersrand
- Known for: DNA repair; Carcinogenesis
- Awards: Lila Gruber Honor Award for Cancer Research; Honorary Doctorate in Science, University of the Witwatersrand; Mellon Lecturer, University of Pittsburgh; Rous-Whipple Award
- Scientific career
- Fields: Molecular biology
- Workplaces: University of Texas Southwestern Medical Center, Stanford University School of Medicine

Errol Clive Friedberg was a biologist and historian of science in the Department of Pathology at Stanford University and subsequently the University of Texas Southwestern Medical Center.

== Education ==
He studied medicine at the University of Witwatersrand in South Africa, and subsequently received postdoctoral training in biochemistry and pathology at Case Western Reserve University before joining the faculty at Stanford University.

== Research ==
Friedberg's research contributions centered on understanding how cells repair and/or tolerate unrepaired damage to DNA and defining the biological consequences of unrepaired DNA damage. He edited and wrote several editions of DNA Repair and Mutagenesis, published by ASM Press.

Friedberg also published several volumes on aspects of the history of molecular biology, including Correcting the Blueprint of Life-An Historical Account of the Discovery of DNA Repair Mechanisms, The Writing Life of James D. Watson, From Rags to Riches-The Phenomenal Rise of the University of Texas Southwestern Medical Center at Dallas, Sydney Brenner: A Biography, A Biography of Paul Berg-The Recombinant DNA Controversy Revisited, Emperor of Enzymes-A Biography of Arthur Kornberg, Biochemist and Nobel Laureate.

Friedberg contributed over 400 papers to the scientific literature, and was Founding Editor-in-Chief of the scientific journal DNA Repair.

== Awards ==
- Rous Whipple Award from the American Society for Investigative Pathology (2000)
- Fellow, American Academy of Microbiology (2002)
- Honorary Doctorate of Science, University of the Witwatersrand (2002)
- Lila Gruber Award for Cancer Research (2007)
- Fellow, American Association for the Advancement of Science (2007)
- Honorary Fellow, Royal Society of South Africa (2012)

== Works ==
- Learning About Your Genes- A Primer For Non-Biologists, pub. World Scientific Publications, Singapore
- The Sabbatical –A Story of Betrayal, pub. United PC Publishers, Fort Myers, FL.
- Emperor of Enzymes -- A Biography of Arthur Kornberg, Biochemist and Nobel Laureate, pub. World Scientific, 2016 ISBN 9814699802
- A Biography of Paul Berg - The Recombinant DNA Controversy Revisited, pub. World Scientific, 2014 ISBN 978-981-4569-03-3
- Sydney Brenner: A Biography, pub. CSHL Press, September 2010, ISBN 0-87969-947-7.
- Sydney Brenner: My Life in Science, with Lewis Wolpert, edited by Errol C. Friedberg and Eleanor Lawrence, BioMed Central 2001, ISBN 0-9540278-0-9
- The Writing Life of James D. Watson, pub. CSHL Press, 2005, ISBN 0-87969-700-8
- From Rags to Riches-The Phenomenal Rise of the University of Texas Southwestern Medical Center at Dallas, Carolina Academic Press, 2007, ISBN 1-59460-397-9
- DNA Repair and Mutagenesis (with G. C. Walker, W. Siede, R. D. Wood, R. A Schultz and T. Ellenberger), pub. ASM Press, 2006, ISBN 1-55581-319-4
- Cancer Answers-Encouraging Answers to 25 Questions You Were Afraid to Ask WH Freeman, New York, 1992, ISBN 0-7167-7023-7
