= Garth Chapman =

British zoologist

Professor Garth Chapman (8 October 1917 – 1 November 2003) was an academic and author in the field of zoology. He enjoyed a long career in the University of London, culminating in his Professorship of Zoology at Queen Elizabeth College from 1958 to 1982 specialising in the study of fluids and hydrostatics in animal systems. He died on 1 November 2003 at his home in Bury St Edmunds, Suffolk.

His publications include The Body Fluids and Their Functions (Institute of Biology, 1967) and (with W.B. Baker) Zoology for Intermediate Students (1964).
