= DNA Repair and Mutagenesis =

- Front cover of the second edition
- Author: Errol C. Friedberg, Graham C. Walker, Wolfram Siede, Richard D. Wood, Roger A. Schultz, Tom Ellenburger
- Subject: Molecular biology
- Publisher: ASM Press
- Publication date: 2006
- Pages: 1,118
- ISBN: 978-1-55581-319-2

DNA Repair and Mutagenesis is a college-level textbook about DNA repair and mutagenesis written by Errol Friedberg, Graham Walker, Wolfram Siede, Richard D. Wood, and Roger Schultz. In its second edition as of 2009, DNA Repair and Mutagenesis contains over 1,000 pages, 10,000 references and 700 illustrations and has been described as "the most comprehensive book available in [the] field."
