= Alan Ebringer =

Australian immunologist (born 1936)

Alan Ebringer FRCP FRACP FRCPath

Professor of Immunology, King's College, London
- In office 1995–?

Personal details
- Born: Alan Martin Ebringer; 12 February 1936 (age 90) Paris, France

Alan Martin Ebringer (born 12 February 1936) is an Australian immunologist, professor at King's College London. He is also an Honorary Consultant Rheumatologist in the Middlesex Hospital, now part of the UCH School of Medicine. He is known for his research in the field of autoimmune disease.

== Early life and education ==
Ebringer is of Slovak heritage and was born in Paris in 1936. He moved to Australia at a young age and was educated in Melbourne High School, and graduated in Medicine from the University of Melbourne.

== Career ==
Ebringer worked for one year as a Medical Registrar at the Walter Eliza Hall Institute under Sir Macfarlane Burnet and Prof. Ian Mackay where he developed an interest in autoimmune diseases.

He moved to London in the 1970s, working first with Ivan Roitt in the Department of Immunology at the Middlesex Hospital. In 1972, he formed the Immunology Unit at Queen Elizabeth College, now linked to King’s College which was located in the Departments of Biochemistry, Microbiology and Biology studying autoimmune diseases. About 22 Ph.D. students graduated from the Immunology Unit over the subsequent thirty years. Ebringer is the pioneer researcher behind autoimmune disease and "molecular mimicry," and was head of the Middlesex AS (Ankylosing Spondylitis) Clinic, London, for nearly 20 years where the London AS Diet was employed as successful therapy in AS patients.

Ebringer was among the first to investigate the relationship between autoimmune diseases such as rheumatoid arthritis and certain bacteria, Proteus mirabilis in particular (Ankylosing Spondylitis and Klebsiella pneumoniae; Multiple Sclerosis and Acinetobacter calcoaceticus). His findings have been cited by proponents of herbal medicine Low-starch and gluten-free diets.

== Publications ==
Ebringer is the author of several books on the subject of autoimmune disease, including Rheumatoid arthritis and Proteus. and Ankylosing spondylitis and Klebsiella (Springer publications) He also published a number of articles on the subject in peer reviewed journals.
