= Clara Knight (classicist) =

British classicist and academic

Clara Millicent Knight (died 31 July 1950) was a British classicist and academic, specialising in comparative philology and classical literature.

Knight was educated privately, and then studied classics at King's College, London, graduating with a second class honours Bachelor of Arts (BA) degree in 1909. In 1914, she was also awarded a Doctor of Literature (DLit) degree.

Knight taught at the University of London from 1910. In 1914, she was teaching at University College, London and King's College for Women. In 1916, she was a lecturer in classical literature at her alma mater King's College, London. She rose to become Reader in Classics (1929–1945) at King's College. In addition to her teaching, she was a Member of Council of the Hellenic Society and of the Council of the Classical Association.

== Selected works ==
- Knight, Clara M. (1914). "The Importance of the Veronese Palimpsest in the First Decade of Livy". The Classical Quarterly. 8 (3): 166–180. doi:10.1017/S0009838800008211. ISSN 0009-8388. JSTOR 635574.
- Knight, Clara M. (1918). "The TO- Participle with the Accusative in Latin". The American Journal of Philology. 39 (2): 184–192. doi:10.2307/289531. ISSN 0002-9475. JSTOR 289531.
- T. Macci Plauti (1919). Knight, Clara M. (ed.). Menaechmi. Cambridge: Cambridge University Press.
- Knight, Clara M. (1921). "The Time-Meaning of the To-Participle in Vergil". The American Journal of Philology. 42 (3): 260–264. doi:10.2307/289584. ISSN 0002-9475. JSTOR 289584.
- Knight, Clara M. (1921). Greek and Latin adverbs and their value in the reconstruction of the prehistoric declensions. Cambridge: Cambridge University Press.
