= Simmer and Jack =

South African company

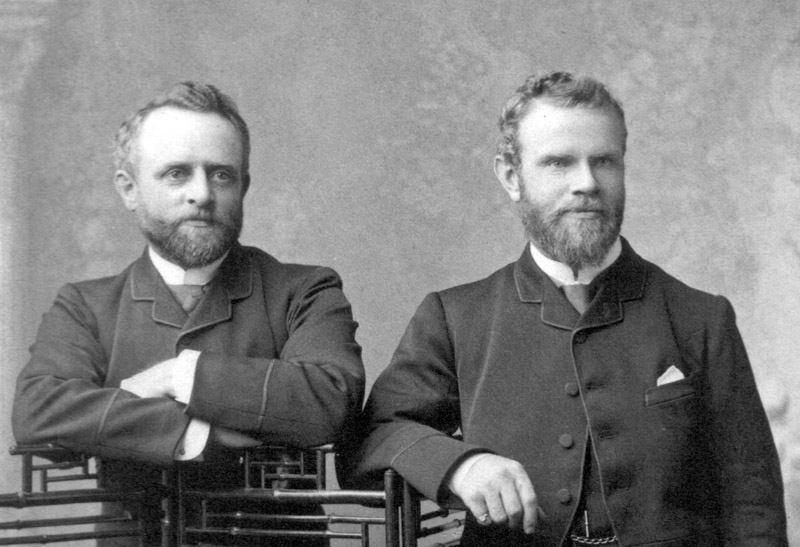
August Simmer and John Jack, c. 1889

Simmer and Jack Mines Ltd (until 1924 known as The Simmer & Jack Gold Mining Co. Ltd.) is a South African company which was founded in 1887 by the German August Simmer and Scotsman John Jack, shortly thereafter selling the majority shareholding to Gold Fields of South Africa Ltd. The company was listed until 2013 at the Johannesburg Stock Exchange.

== History ==
In February 1886, the discovery of gold on the Witwatersrand in South Africa led to the founding of the city of Johannesburg shortly thereafter. The farm Elandsfontein was about ten kilometers east and belonged to a farmer, Sarel Meyer. Simmer & Jack, a trading company in Harrismith which ran a shop in Chrissiesmeer had, a year earlier, acquired half of Meyer's farm. In September 1886 John Jack registered the mining rights on the farm to Simmer & Jack.

With the founding of the company in August 1887 Simmer and Jack took on board the entrepreneur Sir George Farrar, whose family imported drilling equipment to South Africa. Also added to the team was Harry Struben who from 1884 had run a small gold mine in Roodepoort. The town of Germiston was established and named after John Jack's birthplace in Scotland.

The politician and entrepreneur Cecil Rhodes, who had made a fortune in the diamond business, saw the gold finds as another opportunity and began, with his partner Charles Rudd, to buy up farms, mines and mining rights on the Witwatersrand. To finance their activities they founded the London-based company 'The Gold Fields of South Africa Ltd.' Simmer & Jack was one of the first mines to draw their attention.

It soon became apparent that the gold deposits were very large indeed, but that gold could only be extracted from the pyrite with great difficulty and expense using contemporary technology. Contact with the Scottish chemist John Seward MacArthur, brought news of the cyanide process and made possible the success of the South African gold mining industry.

The initial years of the company were against a background of political turmoil (Jameson Raid, Second Boer War), various economic difficulties and huge investments. By 1888 the company had built a crushing or stamp mill with 25 stampers. The plant was further expanded to 100 stampers by 1895 and 320 stampers by 1899. Gold production at the mine reached its peak in 1922. By 1935 Simmer & Jack had processed 27,000,000 tons of rock and extracted 7.8 million ounces of gold for a gross profit of £10 million. In 1965 Goldfields sold their shares as the gold deposits were almost exhausted. The original mine was closed down in 1969.

== Bibliography ==
- The Consolidated Gold Fields of South Africa, Limited, The Gold Fields 1887–1937, London, 1937
- Roy Macnab, Gold Their Touchstone, Johannesburg: Jonathan Ball Publishers, 1987, ISBN 0 86850 140 9
- Eric Rosenthal, Gold! Gold! Gold!, London: The Macmillan Company, 1970
