= Jeanetta Cochrane =

Jeanetta Cochrane (1882 – 1957) was an English theatre practitioner specialising in costume and set design.

== Biography ==
=== Career ===
Jeanetta Cochrane studied at the Polytechnic School of Art in London. In 1914, she started working at the Central School of Art and Design, nowadays Central Saint Martins, where she taught Dress Design. Alongside her teaching job, she produced costumes for various theatres in London. Later on, in 1930, she became Head of the School of Costume at the Central School. Cochrane kept this position until 1957, when she suddenly died.

== Teachings ==
From her student years, Cochrane developed an interest in historical costume accuracy, which she studied in detail, something that she passed on to her students. She also believed that working on actual productions during the course would benefit the students. Such belief led her to build, attached to the school, a theatre with adjoining workshops, costume cutting rooms and design studios.

In her research, she explored the theme of historical accuracy and she did a study on colour and cut, which she transformed into a book, Costume, Colour and Cut: A Sketch of the Evolution of Costume Design with Brief Notes and Patterns to Help Those Interested in Dressing the Play, published in 1955 by the National Federation of Women's Inst.

== Legacy ==
After her death, the London County Council built the Cochrane Theatre, named after her. It was situated in Holborn, London and it opened in 1964.

== Published works ==
Costume Colour and Cut: A Sketch of the Evolution of Costume Design with Brief Notes and Patterns to Help Those Interested in Dressing the Play (1955). National Federation of Women's Inst.

== External sources ==
- Cole, Emily. “In Pictures: Costume designs for John Gielgud’s ‘Hamlet’ and more”, University of the Arts London, 19 April 2016.
