= Agency for Science, Technology and Research =

Government agency in Singapore

Agency overview
- Formed: 11 January 1991; 35 years ago (as National Science and Technology Board); 5 January 2002; 24 years ago (as Agency for Science, Technology and Research)
- Jurisdiction: Government of Singapore
- Headquarters: 2 Fusionopolis Way, Innovis #08-01, Singapore 138634
- Agency executives: Tan Chorh Chuan, Chairman; Beh Kian Teik, CEO; Suresh Sachi, Deputy Chief Executive (Corporate); Andy Hor, Deputy Chief Executive (Research)
- Parent agency: Ministry of Energy, Trade and Industry
- Website: www.a-star.edu.sg
- Agency ID: T08GB0002C

The Agency for Science, Technology and Research (A*STAR) is a statutory board under the Ministry of Energy, Trade and Industry of Singapore.

The agency supports R&D that is aligned to areas of competitive advantage and national needs for Singapore. These span the four technology domains of Manufacturing, Trade and Connectivity, Human Health and Potential, Urban Solutions and Sustainability, and Smart Nation and Digital Economy set out under the nation's five-year R&D plan (RIE2025).

The agency's research institutes are located mostly in Biopolis and Fusionopolis. The total strength of the A*STAR community, including scientists and researchers, technical and non-technical staff, and industry development and commercialization staff is approximately at 5,400.

== History ==
A*STAR was established on 11 January 1991. It was known as the National Science and Technology Board (NSTB) until January 2002.

On 29 October 2003, Singapore's hub for the biomedical sciences, Biopolis, was opened. A*STAR's biomedical research institutes and centres are located at Biopolis, along with other corporate research labs by companies such as Novartis, Danone, Abbott and Procter & Gamble. Over the years, the biomedical sector in Singapore has expanded in tandem with Biopolis. In 2000, the sector contributed 10 per cent to Singapore's manufacturing value-add. In April 2017, biomedical manufacturing was the second largest contributor to total manufacturing value-add at 19.6 per cent.

Fusionopolis One was launched on 17 October 2008, adding a second R&D hub on physical sciences and engineering. The opening of Fusionopolis came as Singapore recorded its highest Gross Domestic Expenditure in R&D (GERD) of S$6.3 billion at that time in 2007. The amount was an unprecedented increase of 26 per cent from the 2006 GERD, and double the amount of S$3 billion recorded in 2000.

On 19 October 2015, Fusionopolis Two was officially opened at the one-north precinct. Together with Fusionopolis One which was launched in 2008, the Fusionopolis cluster integrates all of A*STAR's science and engineering research capabilities and fosters close collaboration between the private and public sectors. The co-location of A*STAR's research institutes at Fusionopolis and Biopolis brings together researchers and industry partners to work closely on projects.

The team from A*STAR helped set up and maintain the GISAID database storing and sharing COVID-19 virus data, including quality checking functions for genomic sequences sent in by various countries.

== A*STAR entities ==
The agency is made up of:

- The Biomedical Research Council (BMRC) – Oversees public sector research activities in the biomedical sciences
- The Science and Engineering Research Council (SERC) – Oversees public sector research activities in the physical sciences & engineering
- The A*STAR Graduate Academy (A*GA) – Administers science scholarships and fellowships, and coordinates collaborative programmes with universities
- Enterprise Division – Manages the commercialisation of intellectual property created by research institutes in Singapore, and facilitates technology transfer to industry

The National Grid Office was also established under A*STAR.

== Industry engagement ==
Between 2011 – 2015, A*STAR worked on 8,965 industry projects, almost six times that of the previous five-year tranche of 1,547. This has resulted in more than S$1.6 billion in industry R&D spending. A*STAR also signed 1,030 licensing agreements over the same period, of which 70 per cent were signed with local SMEs.

By aligning its research with industry demand, the agency has seeded collaborations with multi-national companies such as Rolls-Royce, Applied Materials, Inc., Procter & Gamble (P&G) and Chugai Pharmaceutical Co., Ltd.

In 2014, P&G opened its S$250 million Singapore Innovation Centre at Biopolis to support the company's product development in the areas of beauty, home care, as well as personal health and grooming, with research done here being incorporated into producing products for brands such as Pantene and SK-II.

In October 2015, Applied Materials announced the opening of a new joint R&D laboratory with A*STAR. The five-year agreement included the opening of a S$150 million lab that would be located at Fusionopolis Two. The lab's research would focus primarily on developing advanced semiconductor technologies for use in future generations of logic and memory chips, found in smartphones and laptops. The collaboration with A*STAR marked the second time that Applied Materials has chosen to conduct product development and commercialisation activities outside its Santa Clara headquarters in the US.

== Future of manufacturing ==
To prepare Singapore's manufacturing industry for the future economy, A*STAR outlined its Future of Manufacturing (FoM) roadmap and initiatives at the Committee of Supply Debate 2017.

A*STAR has implemented the Model Factory Initiative at two locations: ARTC and SIMTech.

A*STAR's ARTC would jointly conduct manpower training sessions with consulting firm McKinsey & Company to groom talent for jobs in advanced manufacturing technologies. These sessions cover areas such as predictive maintenance, digitised performance management, procurement and supply chain.

SIMTech also signed MOUs with the Trade Associations and Chambers, the Singapore Precision Engineering and Technology Association (SPETA), and the Singapore Manufacturing Federation (SMF), to provide their members with training to deepen their manufacturing capabilities for the Future Economy.

== Beyond manufacturing ==
Food and Nutrition is an emerging sector in Singapore. One of Singapore's successes between 2011 and 2015 was in growing an R&D ecosystem for the F&N and consumer care sector. This has led to the creation of close to 1,000 new R&D jobs. Leading nutrition companies such as Nestlé (Nestle Research Centre) and Danone (Nutricia Research) have either established new facilities or expanded existing ones in Biopolis, and are working closely with A*STAR to conduct R&D to develop healthier and safer products.

Singapore's first publicly funded drug candidate, ETC-159, which was discovered and developed through a collaboration with Duke-NUS Graduate Medical School, advanced into Phase 1 clinical trials in July 2015. This drug targets a number of cancers, including colorectal, ovarian and pancreatic cancers, which contribute to a significant proportion of Singapore's cancer burden.

A*STAR further announced that its second locally developed cancer drug, ETC-206, which targets blood cancers, has advanced to first-in-man trials in 2016. A*STAR would also be building a centre for large molecules, known as the Experimental Biologics Centre (EBC).

In 2016, A*STAR's commercialisation arm, A*ccelerate (formerly ETPL) opened the first-of-its-kind "open innovation lab" and the incubator known as A*START Central with 10 medtech, biotech and Internet start-ups on board. It can support up to 25 start-ups with conducive infrastructure, mentorship, funding and access to business networks.
