= Biomedical Research Council =

The Biomedical Research Council (Abbreviation: BMRC; Chinese: 生物医药研究理事会) is a research council in Singapore, established in October 2000. This research council supports, oversees and coordinates public sector biomedical research and development activities in Singapore. The Council works in close partnership with the Economic Development Board’s (EDB) Biomedical Sciences Group and Bio*One Capital.
