= Emma Sophia Buchheim =

English translator and educator (1861 – 1951)

One of Buchheim's edited volumes for German beginners.

Emma Sophia Buchheim (1861 – 1951) was an English translator and educator. A lecturer in German at King’s College London for thirty-five years, she published translations and annotated editions of German works. She also compiled language primers for beginners of prose, poetry, and drama, and produced retellings of folktales and mythological stories.

She was the daughter of Karl Adolph Buchheim, professor of German at King’s College London who had emigrated from Germany to England in 1851, and his wife Pauline. After assisting with her father’s German translations, she began working independently with Oxford University Press from 1886.

From 1895 – 1930, Emma taught German at the Department for Ladies at King’s College London (later King’s College for Women), where she was elected board member in 1909. One of her students was Virginia Woolf.

== Works ==
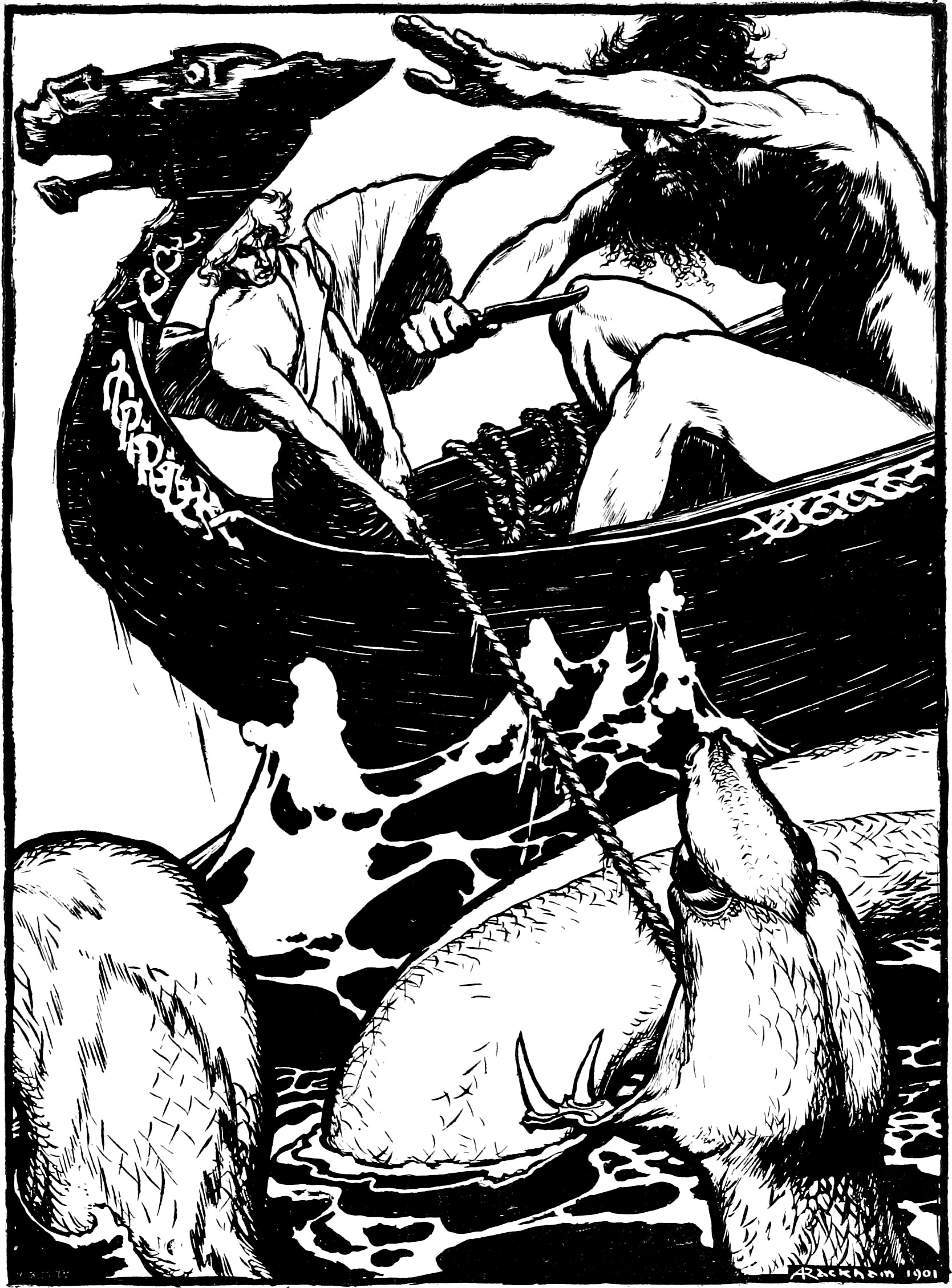
Buchheim's 'Tales from the Eddas' (1907) was illustrated by Arthur Rackham.

=== Language primers ===
- Elementary German Prose Composition (1894)
- Short German Plays for Reading and Acting (1900)
- German Poetry for Beginners (1906)

=== Editions ===
- Peter Schlemihls wundersame Geschichte by Adelbert von Chamisso (1889)
- Griechische heroen-geschichten by Barthold Georg Niebuhr (1891)
- Hermann und Dorothea by Johann Wolfgang von Goethe (1901)

=== Select translations ===
- An Egyptian Princess by Georg Ebers (1890)
- How to Attract and Protect Wild Birds by Martin Hiesemann (1912)
