= Sarah Elizabeth Smith =

Sarah Elizabeth Smith may refer to:

- Sally E. Smith (1941–2019), British-born Australian mycologist
- Sarah Smith (journalist) (born 1968), Scottish journalist

== See also ==
- Elizabeth Smith (disambiguation)
- Sarah Smith (disambiguation)
