= Arthur Roy Clapham =

British botanist

- Born: 24 May 1904; Norwich, United Kingdom
- Died: 18 December 1990 (aged 86)
- Education: Downing College, Cambridge
- Known for: Coined the term ecosystem; Vice chancellor Sheffield University
- Spouse: Brenda North Stoessiger
- Awards: Linnean Medal (1972)
- Scientific career
- Fields: Botany, Plant physiology
- Workplaces: Rothamsted Experimental Station; University of Oxford; University of Sheffield
- Author abbrev. (botany): A.R.Clapham

Arthur Roy Clapham CBE, FRS (24 May 1904 – 18 December 1990), was a British botanist. Born in Norwich and educated at Downing College, Cambridge, Clapham worked at Rothamsted Experimental Station as a crop physiologist (1928–30), and then took a teaching post in the botany department at Oxford University. He was Professor of Botany at Sheffield University 1944–69 and vice chancellor of the university during the 1960s. He coauthored the Flora of the British Isles, which was the first, and for several decades the only, comprehensive flora of the British Isles published in 1952 and followed by new editions in 1962 and 1987. In response to a request from Arthur Tansley, he coined the term ecosystem in the early 1930s.

== Early life and education ==
Clapham was born in Norwich to George Clapham, an elementary school teacher and Dora Margaret Clapham, née Harvey. He was the oldest of three children and the only boy. He attended the City of Norwich School, where he sat the Cambridge Senior School Certificate in 1919 and Higher School Certificate in 1921. Clapham attended Downing College, Cambridge in 1922 after receiving a Minor Scholarship. He received a BA with First Class Honours and was awarded the Frank Smart Prize for Botany.

After completing his B.A., Clapham did graduate work in plant physiology under the supervision of Frederick Blackman before taking up a position as crop physiologist at the Rothamsted Agricultural Experimental Station where he worked with Ronald Fisher. Influenced by Fisher's work on statistical analysis and random sampling, Clapham worked on using small samples to reliably estimate wheat yields and designed the Ministry of Agriculture's protocol of sampling wheat crops to forecast crop yields. It was during this time period that he met his future wife, Brenda Stoessiger who was a research student working with Karl Pearson, a pioneer of mathematical statistics. Years later, Donald Pigott, then Director, Cambridge University Botanic Garden, wrote (for Clapham's obituary in the Journal of Ecology) that it was probably through his connection to Fisher that Clapham met Stoessiger. Clapham received a PhD from Cambridge in 1929 based on his work with Blackman in physiology and his work on sampling methods at Rothamsted.

== Professional career ==
In 1930 Clapham was appointed a Demonstrator in Botany at the University of Oxford. At Oxford he worked closely with Arthur Tansley. In 1944 he left Oxford to take up the position of Chair of Botany at the University of Sheffield where he remained until his retirement in 1969. At Sheffield he served as Pro-Vice-Chancellor from 1954 to 1958 and as Acting Vice-Chancellor in 1956.

Clapham served as the President of the British Ecological Society from 1954 to 1956, and President of the Linnean Society from 1967 to 1970.

== Awards and honours ==
Clapham was elected a Fellow of the Linnean Society in 1949 and a Fellow of the Royal Society in 1959. Clapham received the Linnean Medal in 1972, and was appointed Commander of the Order of the British Empire in 1969. In 1970 he received honorary doctorates from the University of Aberdeen and the University of Sheffield.

== Personal life ==
Clapham married Brenda North Stoessiger in 1933. Their first child, John, died at the age of 13 months in 1935. Clapham and his wife had three other children – daughters Elizabeth and Jennifer, born in 1935 and 1937 respectively, and a son, David, born in 1944. Brenda Clapham died in 1985. After her death, Clapham's health worsened. He died in 1990.

== Major contributions ==
Initially trained in plant physiology, Clapham's contributions included work on sampling design, forecasting crop yields, ecology, plant systematics and palaeoecology. Clapham contributed to Tansley's The British islands and their vegetation, published in 1939, and a series of volumes on the vegetation of Germany for the Naval Intelligence Division during World War II. Beginning in 1940, Clapham took a lead role in the production of the ongoing Biological Flora of the British Isles. In 1953, in conjunction with T.G. Tutin and E. F. Warburg he published the Flora of the British Isles (followed by two later editions in 1962 and 1987) and in 1959, the Excursion Flora of the British Isles. In 1969 he edited and helped publish the Flora of Derbyshire.

== Books ==
- (with W.O. James) The biology of flowers. Oxford : Clarendon Press, 1935.
- (with T.G. Tutin and E. F. Warburg), Flora of the British Isles. Cambridge : Cambridge University Press (first edition 1952, second edition 1962 and third edition 1987 with Warburg replaced by D.M. Moore).
- (with T.G. Tutin and E.F. Warburg) Excursion flora of the British Isles. Cambridge : Cambridge University Press 1959.
- Flora of Derbyshire. Derby Museum and Art Gallery. 1969.
- The Oxford book of trees, (illustrations by B.E. Nicholson). London : Oxford University Press, 1975.

Academic offices
Preceded by John Macnaghten Whittaker	Acting Vice-Chancellor of the University of Sheffield; 1965	Succeeded by Hugh Robson
