= Cambridge University Botanic Garden =

Botanical garden in Cambridge, England

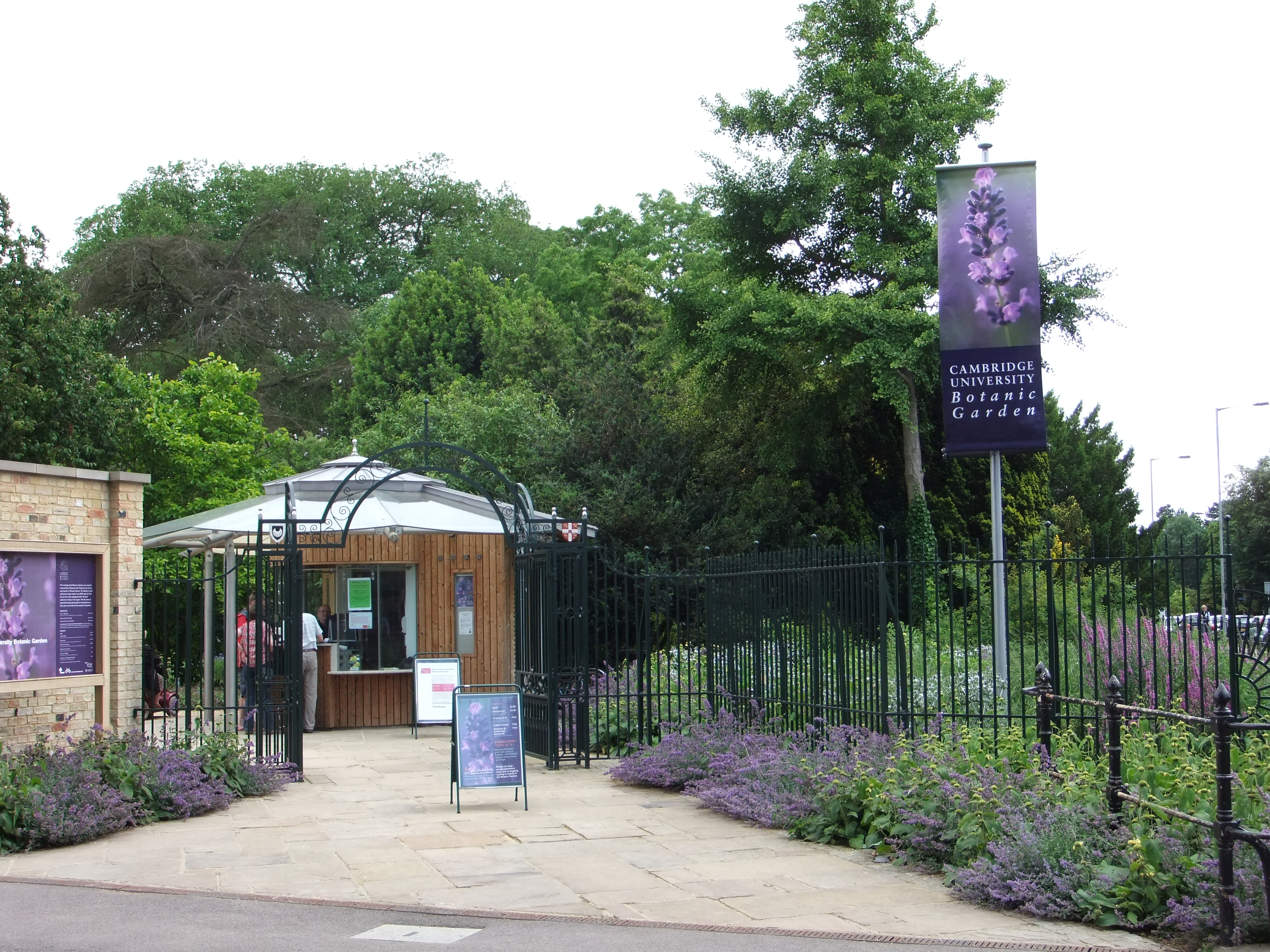
- The public entrance to Cambridge University Botanic Garden
- Interactive map of Cambridge University Botanic Garden
- Type: Botanic Garden
- Location: Cambridge, England
- Coordinates: 52°11′37″N 0°07′38″E
- Area: 16 hectares (40 acres)
- Created: 1831
- Operator: University of Cambridge
- Visitors: 334,461 (2019)
- Status: Open all year
- Public transit: Cambridge railway station
- Director: Beverley Glover
- Website: www.botanic.cam.ac.uk

The Cambridge University Botanic Garden is a botanical garden located in Cambridge, England, associated with the university Department of Plant Sciences (formerly Botany School). It lies between Trumpington Road to the west, Bateman Street to the north and Hills Road to the east.

The garden covers an area of 16 hectares (40 acres). The site is almost entirely on level ground and in addition to its scientific value, the garden is highly rated by gardening enthusiasts. It holds a plant collection of over 8,000 plant species from all over the world to facilitate teaching and research. The garden was created for the University of Cambridge in 1831 by Professor John Stevens Henslow (Charles Darwin's mentor) and was opened to the public in 1846.

The second-highest temperature recorded in the UK, 38.7 °C (101.7 °F), was recorded on 25 July 2019 at the garden. The garden held this record for four years until it was broken in 2022, when 40.3 °C (104.5 °F) was recorded in Coningsby, Lincolnshire on 19 July of that year. On this day, the garden broke its own record, reaching 39.9 °C (103.8 °F).

== History ==
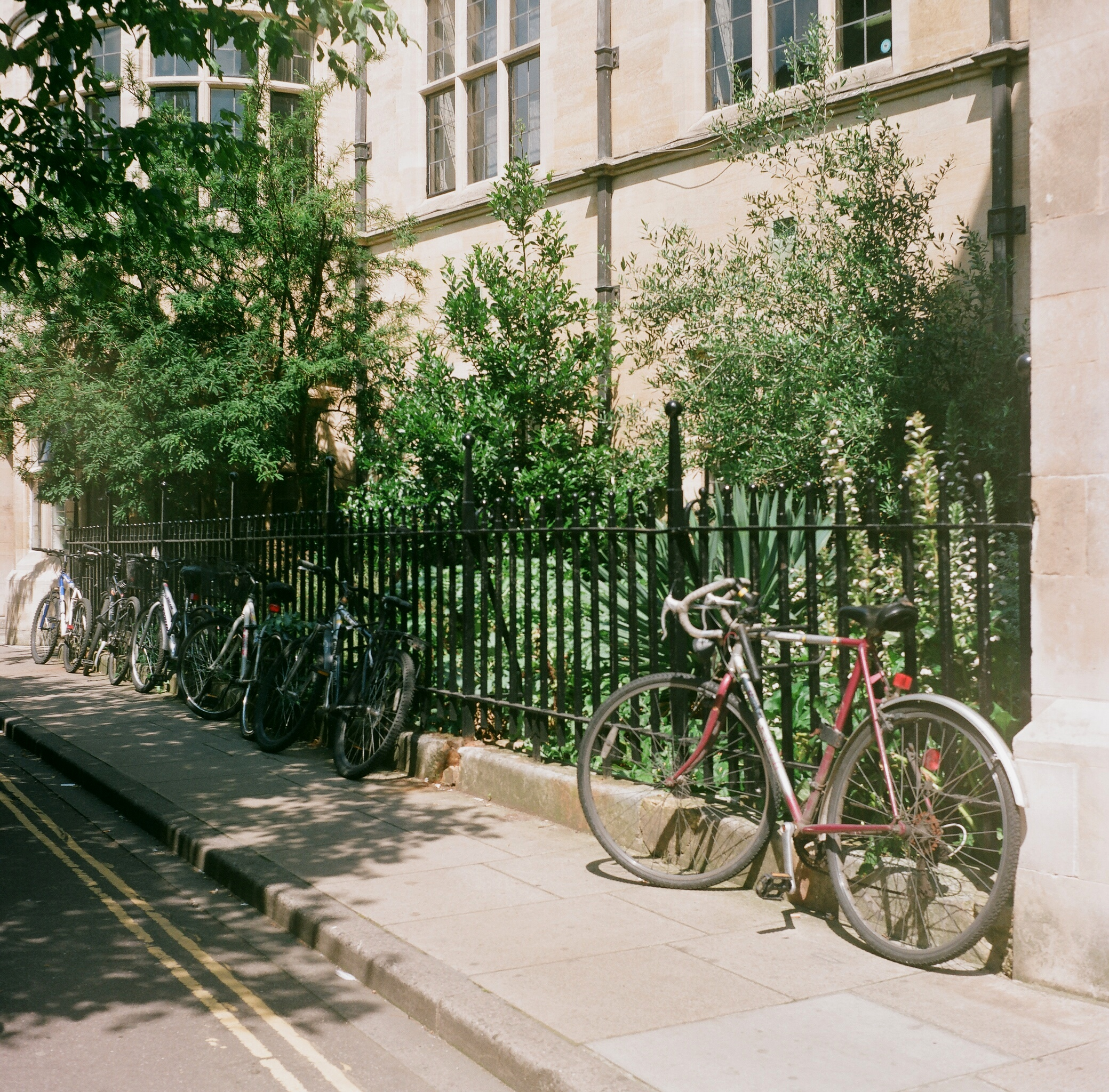
The New Museums Site on Free School Lane was once the home to the Walkerian Garden. Eventually, the University built the Cavendish Laboratory here, but a small patch of garden has been planted with plants representative of the stock of the original garden.

=== Walkerian Garden ===
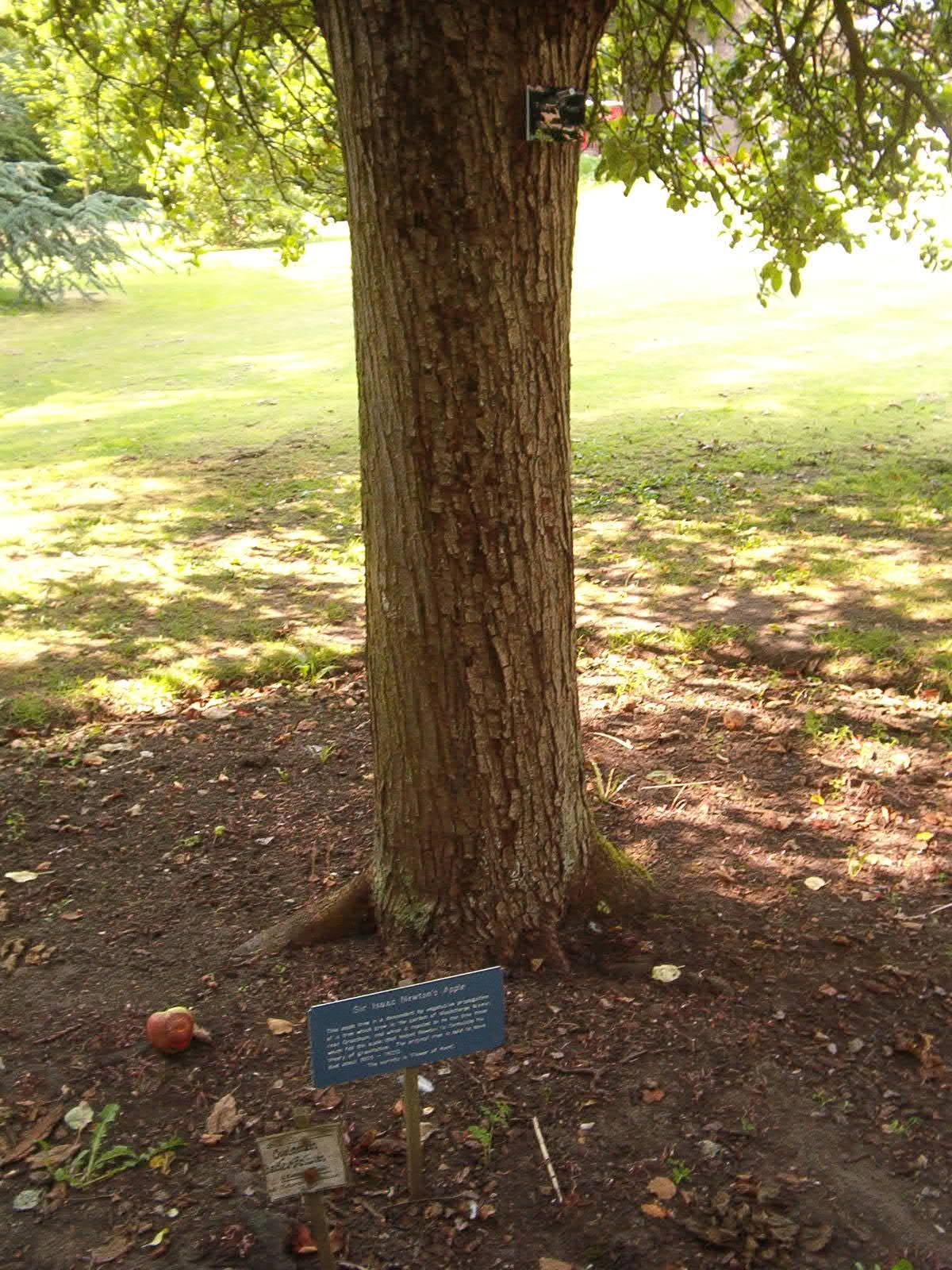
An apple tree (died 2022) that was reportedly a descendant of the tree that inspired Isaac Newton to formulate his theory of gravitation

After several unsuccessful attempts during the 16th, 17th, and early 18th centuries, a University Botanic Garden was finally established at Cambridge between 1760 and 1763. This was not on the site of the present Garden, but in the centre of the town, on about 5 acres of land then occupied by 'The Mansion House' of the old Augustinian friary, and today by the New Museums Site and other university buildings. It was Dr. Richard Walker, Vice-Master of Trinity College, who, on the advice of Philip Miller of the Chelsea Physic Garden, purchased the property for £1,600, and presented it to the University for use as a Botanic Garden. For some years the Garden was known as the Walkerian Botanic Garden, and there is, at the present Garden, a Walkerian Society named in honour of its founder.

The Walkerian Garden was laid out and developed by the then professor of botany, Thomas Martyn. This small garden was conceived as a typical Renaissance physic garden, inspired by the Chelsea Physic Garden in London. It grew herbaceous plants used in the teaching of medical students at the university. Glasshouses and a lecture room for the professor were built and the teaching of botany in Cambridge, which was then at a low ebb, received, for a time, a considerable stimulus. This improvement, however, did not last for long. Martyn left in 1798 and visited Cambridge only occasionally until his death in 1825. About 1790 James Donn was appointed curator, and in 1796 he published the first edition of Hortus Cantabrigiensis, a list of the plants in the Garden which reached its 13th edition in 1845, long after Donn's death.

=== Botanic Garden ===
In 1825 John Stevens Henslow, Charles Darwin's teacher at Cambridge, succeeded Martyn as professor of botany and soon realized that a larger site, farther from the centre of Cambridge, was desirable for the Botanic Garden. In 1831 the university purchased the present site of about 40 acres to the south of the town on the Trumpington Road, and in 1846 the first tree was planted. It had been the intention to lay out the whole 40 acres as a Botanic Garden, but presumably funds were lacking, and in fact only 20 acres were planted, the remainder being let out as allotments.

The planning of the new garden was carried out by Professor Henslow, assisted by young Cardale Babington. The land was flat and unpromising as a garden site, but the layout was planned with great skill, utilizing an old gravel pit to construct a lake with a high mound running into it. Trees and shrubs were planted according to their botanical sequence, a range of glasshouses was built in the 1860s, and a rock garden, one of the earliest of its kind in the country, was constructed about the same time. The Garden has also long been known for its many fine specimens of rare trees. By the 1870s the main features of the Garden had been developed and, it was ready to play its part in the great expansion of botanical teaching and research that was about to take place at Cambridge. During the early years of the 20th century much of the pioneer work of William Bateson, Charles Chamberlain Hurst, and Edith Rebecca Saunders on plant genetics was carried out at the Garden, and it was later used for researches on plant physiology by Frederick Blackman and George Edward Briggs, and on plant pathology by Frederick Tom Brooks and others.

On 25 July 2019, a new UK temperature record at the time (beaten again in 2022) was set at 38.7C (101.7F) within the gardens, which exceeded the previous record of 38.5C (101.3F) set in Faversham on 10 August 2003.

Between 1954 and February 2022 the Botanic Garden was home to the Isaac Newton tree. The tree was a Flower of Kent grown from a cutting of the tree that dropped the apple that Newton claimed inspired him to produce his theory of gravity. The tree was blown down in Storm Eunice on 19 February 2022.

== Research ==
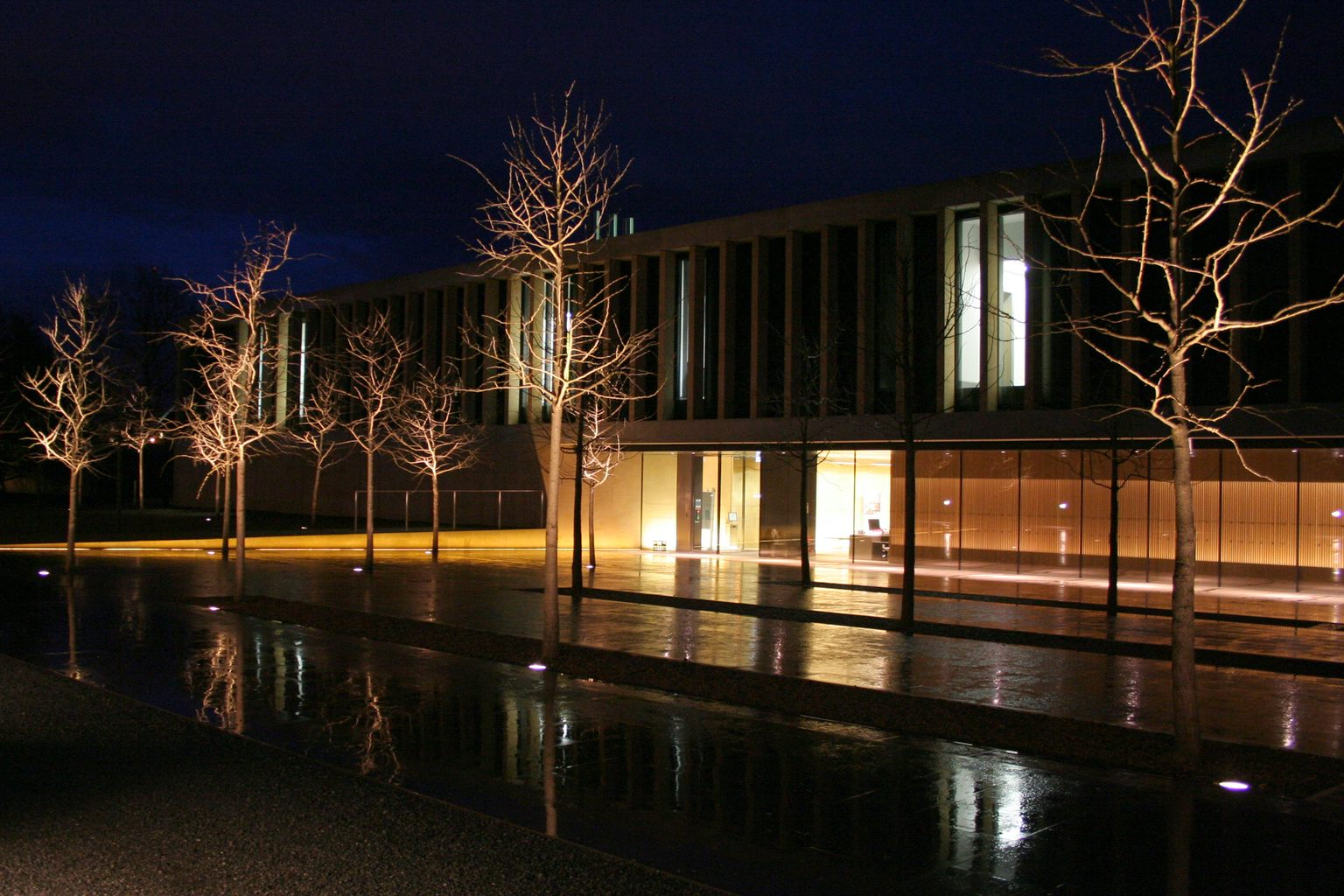
Sainsbury Laboratory Cambridge University

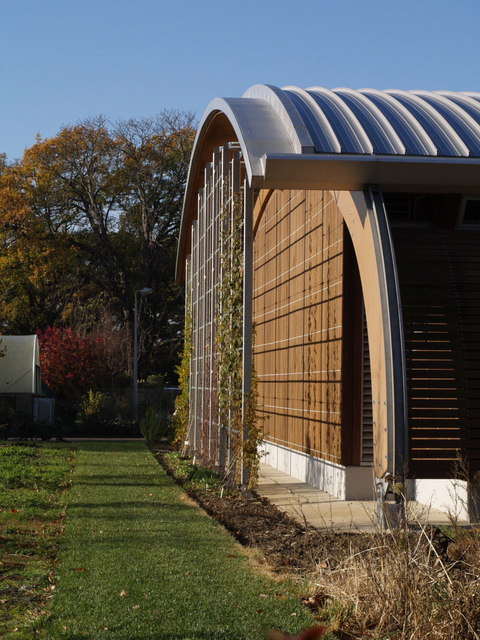
Department of Plant Sciences' Plant Growth Facility

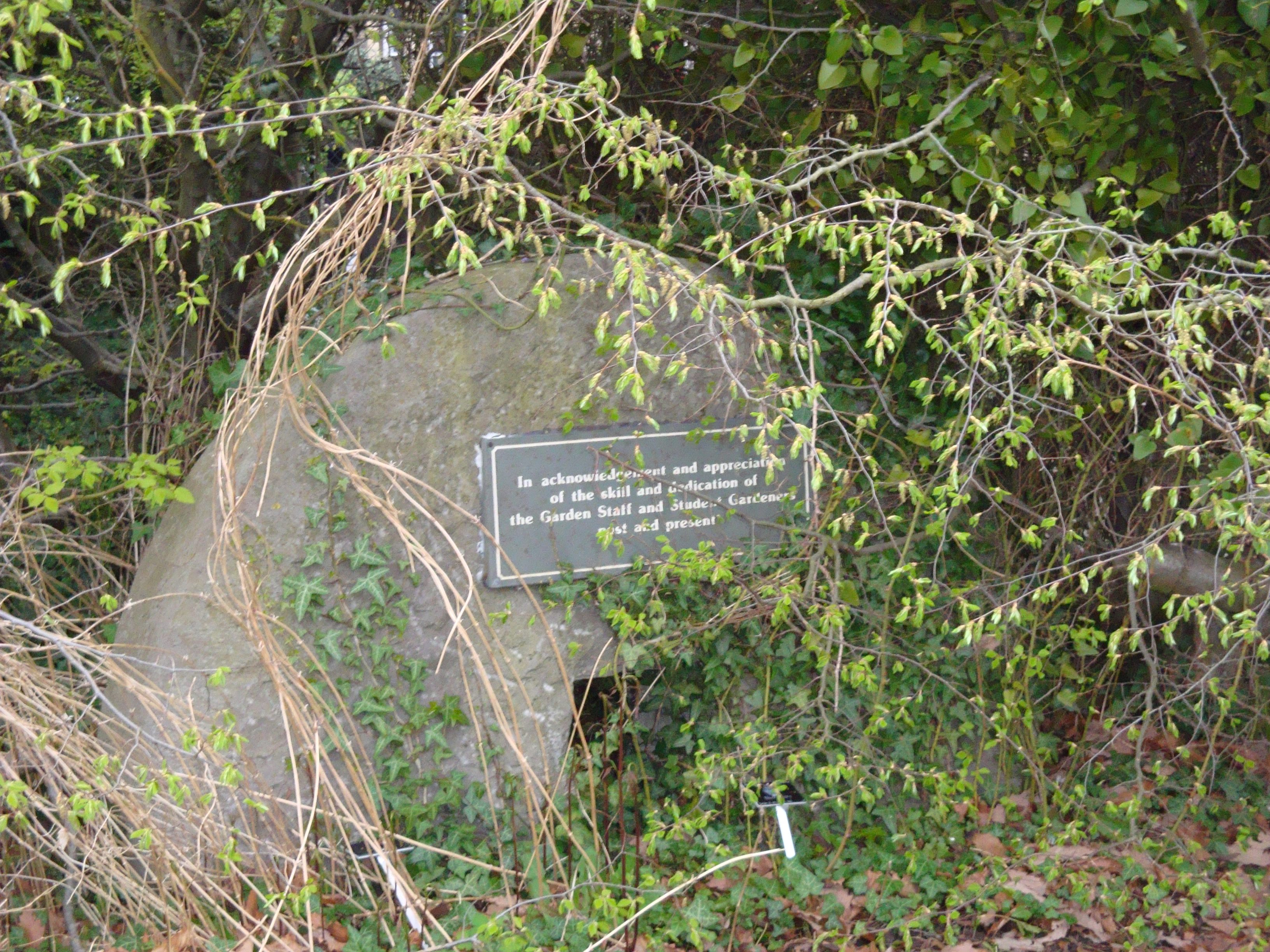
Plaque to gardening staff at Cambridge Botanical Garden DSC00255 - Copy

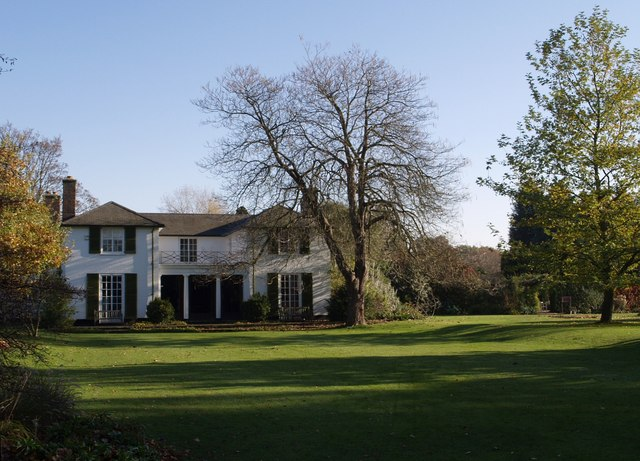
Cory Lodge

The chair of botany at the University of Cambridge was created in 1724 for Richard Bradley (1724–1732). As of 2016, fifteen botanists have held that position, including John Martyn (1733–1762), John Stevens Henslow (1825–1861) and Harry Marshall Ward (1895–1906) (see list). In 1991 the Botany School was renamed the Department of Plant Sciences. In 2005 the title was changed to Regius Professor of Botany, the appointment as of 2016 is that of Professor Sir David Baulcombe. The current Plant Sciences building on the Downing Site was constructed in 1904 during Ward's tenure, when the main areas of research were morphology, systematics, pathology and physiology. Morphologists in that period included Agnes Arber, John Corner, and Kenneth Sporne, whose phylogenetic approach was well ahead of the seminal work of Willi Hennig.

In 1921 the university appointed H. Gilbert-Carter as the first scientific director of the garden, in conjunction with the curatorship of the herbarium and who published the first guide to the garden. Amongst other directors of the garden were John Gilmour (1951–1973), and Max Walters (1973–1983) who published a history of the garden in 1981. The current director is Beverley Glover (2013–) (see list).

The newly built Sainsbury Laboratory Cambridge University (SLCU) in the grounds of the garden is a highly collaborative and interdisciplinary new research institute. Focusing on the regulatory systems underlying plant growth and development, the Lab uses cutting-edge scientific resources and predictive computational models to further understand of the dynamic, self-organising properties of plants. It was funded by Lord Sainsbury, chancellor of the university, and opened by Queen Elizabeth II in April 2011. It houses the university herbarium, moved from the Downing Site in 2011.

== Curators and directors of the botanic garden ==
The following people have been the curators and, since 1921 directors, of the botanic garden.

- Charles Miller (1763-1770)
- James Donn (1794-1813)
- Arthur Biggs (1813-1845)
- Andrew Murray (1845-1850)
- James Stratton (1851-1864)
- William Mudd (1864-1879)
- Richard Irwin Lynch (1879-1919)
- Humphrey Gilbert-Carter (1921-1950) title changed to Director
- John Scott Lennox Gilmour (1951-1973)
- Stuart Max Walters (1973-1984)
- Christopher Donald Pigott (1984-95)
- Beverley Glover (2013-present)

== Garden features ==
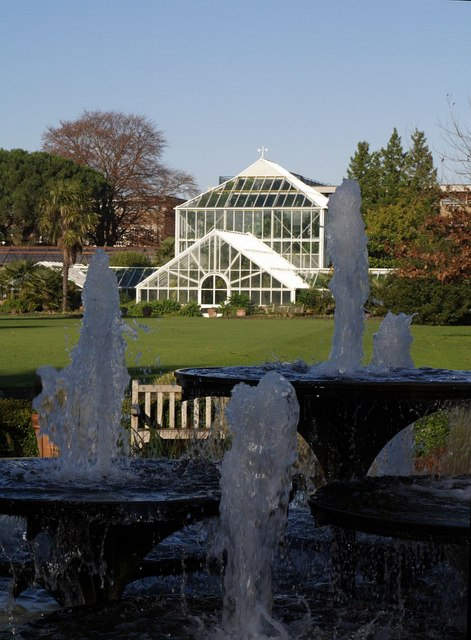
The fountain with the glasshouses behind.

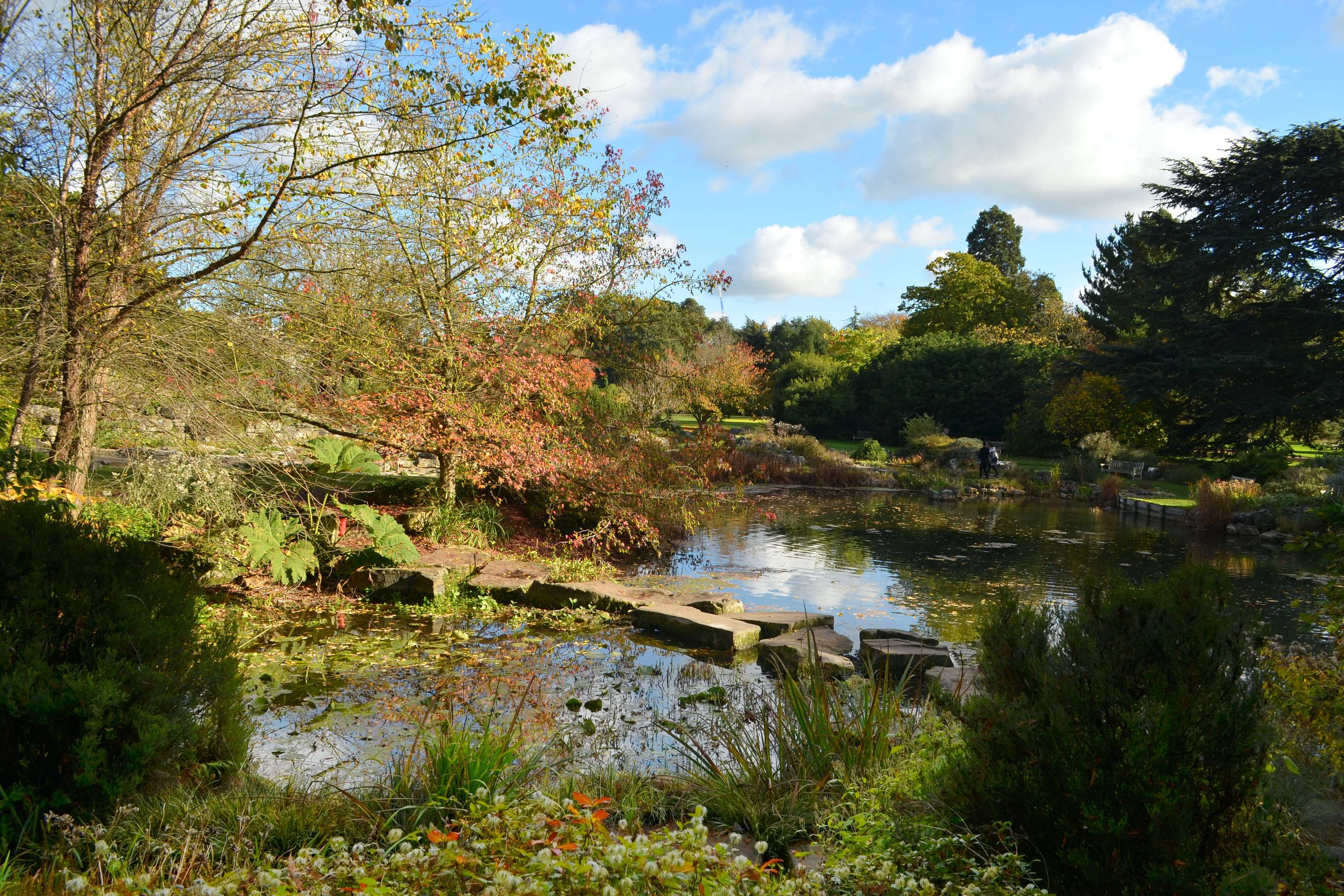
The botanic garden lake in October 2017

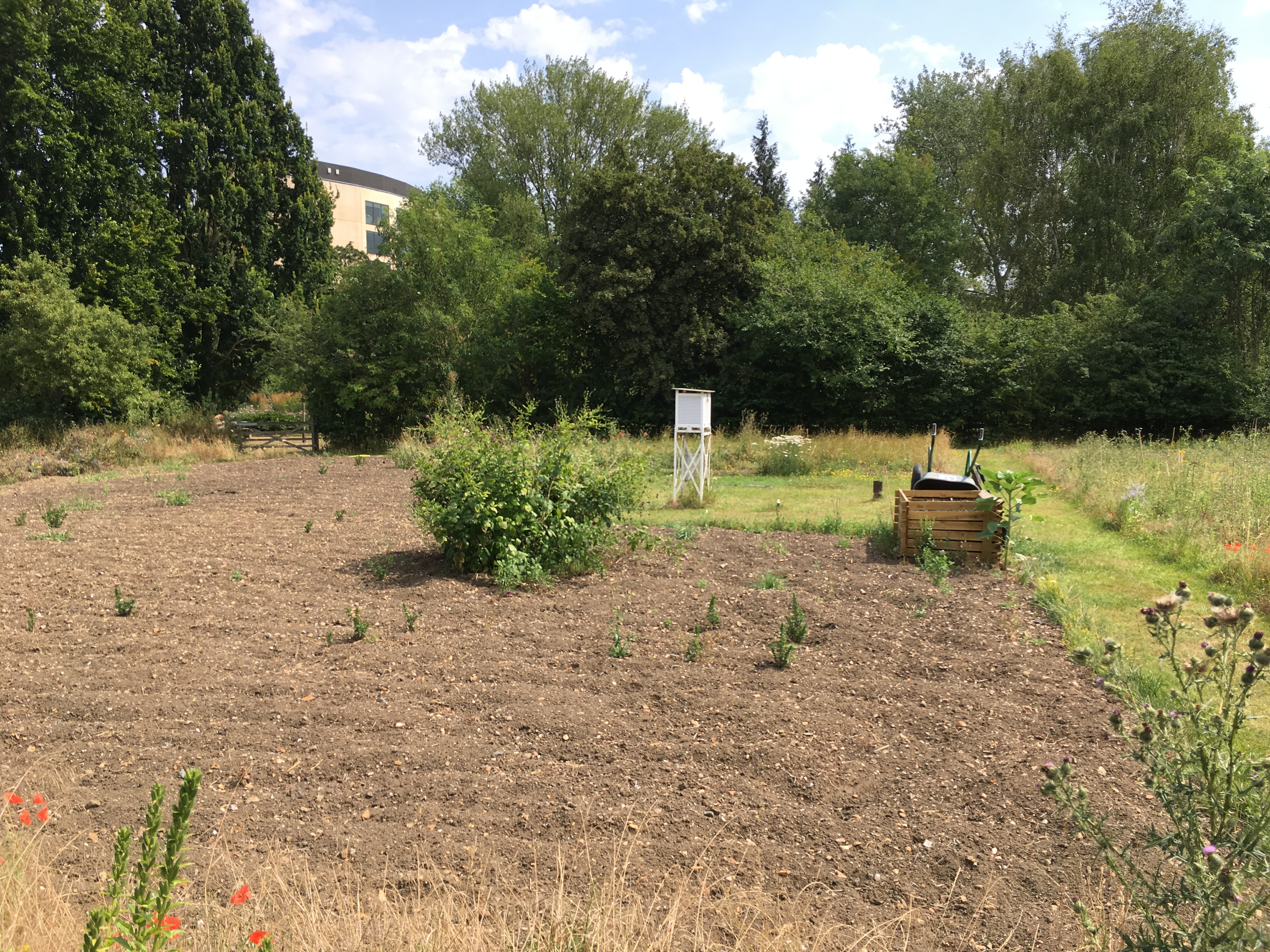
Weather Station in the Garden Research Plots

- Autumn colour garden
- Bed of British native plants
- Dry garden — demonstrates planting requiring reduced watering
- Fen display
- Genetics garden
- Glasshouses, containing about 3,000 species, have been restored and almost entirely replanted to display global plant diversity, and comprise:
  - Continents Apart, comparing and contrasting the fire dependent, floristically rich plant communities of South Africa and SW Australia, once conjoined in the supercontinent Gondwana
  - Oceanic Islands, exploring the floral diversity peculiar to island archipelagos
  - Mountains, exploring how plants survive life in a cold climate
  - Tropical Rainforests, a hotbed of competition
  - Carnivores, displaying the diversity of traps in carnivorous plants
  - Arid Lands, displaying drought tolerant plants from continental Africa and the Americas, including many succulent and cactus species, and demonstrating the phenomenon of convergent evolution.
  - Life Before Flowers, full of ferns and filmy ferns.
- Herbaceous borders
- Garden Research Plots for various projects or growing single genera
- Lake

National plant collections of:

  - Alchemilla
  - Bergenia
  - European Fritillaria
  - Lonicera
  - Ribes
  - Ruscus
  - Saxifraga
  - Species Tulips
  - Hardy Geraniums
- Important scientific and research collections of:
  - Lavender
- Rock gardens — for alpine plants
  - Limestone rock garden
  - Sandstone rock garden
- Scented garden
- Systematic beds — 144 island beds representing 80 families of flowering plants
- Tree collection
- Water garden
- Winter garden (December to April)
- Woodland garden — containing spring bulbs

=== Cory Lodge and Lawn ===
Cory Lodge was built in 1924–5 with money given to the University by Reginald Cory, an alumnus of Trinity College, Cambridge and was originally used as the residence of the Director of the Botanic Garden. Adjacent to Cory Lodge is a superb specimen of Catalpa speciosa, an Indian bean tree from North America, with white flowers followed by long slender fruits. On the north wall of the house is a specimen of Ginkgo biloba, the Chinese maidenhair tree, trained as an espalier since 1987.

== See also ==
- Director, Cambridge University Botanic Garden
- Regius Professor of Botany (Cambridge)
- List of botanical gardens in the United Kingdom
- List of botanical gardens
- University of Oxford Botanic Garden
- Sainsbury Laboratory Cambridge University

== Bibliography ==
=== Books and articles ===
- Curtis's Botanical Magazine. "Volume 23, Issue 1. February 2006".
  - Cullen, Juliet (2006). "Max Walters, an Appreciation". Curtis's Botanical Magazine. 23: 2–3. doi:10.1111/j.1355-4905.2006.00520.x., in Curtis (2006)
  - Day, Juliet (2006). "Reginald Cory, Benefactor of Cambridge University Botanic Garden". Curtis's Botanical Magazine. 23: 119–131. doi:10.1111/j.1355-4905.2006.00505.x., in Curtis (2006)
  - Parker, John (2006). "The Development of the Cambridge University Botanic Garden". Curtis's Botanical Magazine. 23: 4–19. doi:10.1111/j.1355-4905.2006.00501.x., in Curtis (2006)
  - Rix, Martyn (2006). "Editorial". Curtis's Botanical Magazine. 23. Celebration of the University Botanic Garden: 1. doi:10.1111/j.1355-4905.2006.00500.x., in Curtis (2006)
- Gilbert-Carter, Humphrey (1922). Guide to the University Botanic Garden Cambridge. Cambridge University Press. ISBN 9781107643178.
- Lacey, Pippa. "Changing Perspectives: a Garden through time". Cambridge University Botanic Garden.
- Raven, John A. (April 2004). "Building botany in Cambridge. 1904–2004: the centenary of the opening of the Botany School, University of Cambridge, UK". New Phytologist. 162 (1): 7–8. doi:10.1111/j.1469-8137.2004.01040.x.
- Walters, S.M. (1981). The shaping of Cambridge botany : a short history of whole-plant botany in Cambridge from the time of Ray into the present century. Cambridge University Press. ISBN 9780521237956.
- Grubb, Peter J; Snow, E Anne; Walters, S Max (2004). 100 Years of Plant Sciences in Cambridge: 1904–2004. Department of Plant Sciences, Cambridge University.
  - Cover Archived 30 December 2016 at the Wayback Machine

=== Websites ===
- BHO (2015). "British History Online". Institute of Historical Research, University of London.
- Plant Sciences (2015). "University of Cambridge, Department of Plant Sciences".
  - Library
- Herbarium (2015). "University of Cambridge, Herbarium".
- "Cambridge University Herbarium". Department of Plant Sciences, Cambridge University. Archived from the original on 18 September 2016.
- CUBG. "Cambridge University Botanic Garden". Cambridge University.
