= John Parker (botanist) =

British botanist

John Stewart Parker
- Education: Oxford University
- Known for: Botany, Plant Genetics, Evolutionary history
- Scientific career
- Institutions: Cambridge University Botanic Garden, Cambridge University Botany School

Professor John Stewart Parker is a British botanist and was the fifth director of Cambridge University Botanic Garden (1996 – 2010), succeeding Donald Pigott.

== Life and work ==
John Parker was educated at Oxford University, getting his D.Phil. in 1971 for his work on plant chromosomes and natural populations. After leaving Oxford he was lecturer and then reader in Genetics at Queen Mary College, University of London (1969 – 1992). Subsequently, he became head of the Botany Department at Reading University (1992 – 1996) before moving to Cambridge in 1996 as Director of the Botanic Garden, Curator of the University Herbarium (1999 – 2010) and Professor of Plant Cytogenetics.

He came into the position at a time when the university's 1995 review had urged forging greater links between the Garden and the university's academic departments. In addition to making links within the university, Parker set about engaging with the community, and schools programmes. On the research side, Parker established the Genetics Garden in 1998, and oversaw the planning of the Sainsbury Laboratory which was officially opened in 2011. His major research interests have been in evolutionary genetics. He was a Fellow and then Emeritus Fellow of Clare Hall, Cambridge. Parker stepped down as director in 2010, and was succeeded by Tim Upson, as acting director from 2010–2013. In 2013, Beverley Glover became the sixth Director.

== Selected publications ==
- Parker, John (February 2006). "The Development of the Cambridge University Botanic Garden". Curtis's Botanical Magazine. 23 (1): 4–19. doi:10.1111/j.1355-4905.2006.00501.x.
- Kohn, D.; Murrell, G.; Parker, J. S.; Whitehorn, M. (2005). "What Henslow taught Darwin" (PDF). Nature. 436 (7051): 643–645. Bibcode:2005Natur.436..643K. doi:10.1038/436643a. PMID 16079834. S2CID 4300384.

== Bibliography ==
- CUBG. "Cambridge University Botanic Garden". Cambridge University.
  - "Professor John Parker"., in CUBG (2016)
- "Professor John S Parker". Clare Hall, Cambridge.
- Grubb, Peter J; Snow, E Anne; Walters, S Max (2004). 100 Years of Plant Sciences in Cambridge: 1904–2004. Department of Plant Sciences, Cambridge University.
  - Cover Archived 30 December 2016 at the Wayback Machine
