= John Gilmour (botanist) =

British botanist

- Born: 28 September 1906; London
- Died: 3 June 1986 (aged 79)
- Education: Uppingham School; Clare College, Cambridge
- Known for: Botany, Horticulture, Systematics
- Awards: Victoria Medal of Honour
- Scientific career
- Institutions: Cambridge University Botanic Garden, Royal Botanic Gardens, Kew, RHS Wisley

John Scott Lennox Gilmour VMH FLS (28 September 1906 – 3 June 1986) was a British botanist, curator of the Cambridge University Herbarium, and later director of Cambridge University Botanic Garden and Fellow of Clare College, Cambridge.

== Life ==
John Gilmour was born in London and educated at Downs School, Malvern, Uppingham School, Rutland and Clare College, Cambridge. From 1930 to 1931 he was Curator of the Herbarium and Botanical Museum, Botany School, Cambridge University, from 1931 to 1946 Assistant Director, Royal Botanic Gardens, Kew, from 1946 to 1951 Director, Royal Horticultural Society, Wisley and from 1951 to 1973 Director, Cambridge University Botanic Garden. With William T. Stearn he issued two exsiccata-like works Herbarium florae Cantabrigiensis and Sertum Cantabrigiense exsiccatum (1933). From 1946 to 1979 he was also editor of the New Naturalist. John, a declared atheist, teamed up with Fr Maycock of Little Saint Mary's to help found the Cambridge Cyrenians, dealing with the homeless. He died in 1986, at the age of 79.

== Cambridge 1951–1973 ==
On returning to Cambridge, Gilmour succeeded Humphrey Gilbert-Carter as director in 1951, he was an important force in the development of the Eastern Garden, once the Cory Fund monies became available, and the Cory Laboratory and glasshouses were constructed in 1957. His scientific contributions were largely in the field of systematics and horticulture, playing an important role in the Systematics Association. When he retired in 1973 he was succeeded by Max Walters.

== Awards ==
In 1957 he was awarded the Royal Horticultural Society's Victoria Medal of Honour and in 1966 their Veitch Memorial Medal.

== Selected publications ==
- Gilmour, J. and S. M. Walters, (1954) Wild Flowers, Botanising Britain, Collins
- Gilmour, J. and S. M. Walters, (1955) New Naturalist No 5, Wild Flowers, Collins

== Bibliography ==
- Lacey, Pippa. "Changing Perspectives: a Garden through time". Cambridge University Botanic Garden.
- Walters, S.M. (1981). The shaping of Cambridge botany : a short history of whole-plant botany in Cambridge from the time of Ray into the present century. Cambridge University Press. ISBN 9780521237956.
- Metcalfe, C. R. (1963). "J. S. L. Gilmour. President, 1963/1964" (PDF). The Journal of the Kew Guild: 263–265. Archived from the original (PDF) on 19 February 2014.
- Stearn, William T. (1989a). "List of publications of John S. L. Gilmour". Plant Systematics and Evolution. 167 (1–2): 109–112. Bibcode:1989PSyEv.167..109S. doi:10.1007/BF00936553. S2CID 677643.
