= Director, Cambridge University Botanic Garden =

The academic position of Director, Cambridge University Botanic Garden was created in 1921.

== Directors ==
- Humphrey Gilbert-Carter (1921)
- John Gilmour (1951)
- Max Walters (1973)
- Donald Pigott (1984)
- John Parker (1996)
- Tim Upson (Acting) (2010)
- Beverley Glover (2013)

== Bibliography ==
- Lacey, Pippa. "Changing Perspectives: a Garden through time". Cambridge University Botanic Garden.
- Walters, S.M. (1981). The shaping of Cambridge botany : a short history of whole-plant botany in Cambridge from the time of Ray into the present century. Cambridge University Press. ISBN 9780521237956.
