= Department of Plant Sciences, University of Cambridge =

Academic department of the University of Cambridge

Coordinates: 52.202896°N 0.12150384°E

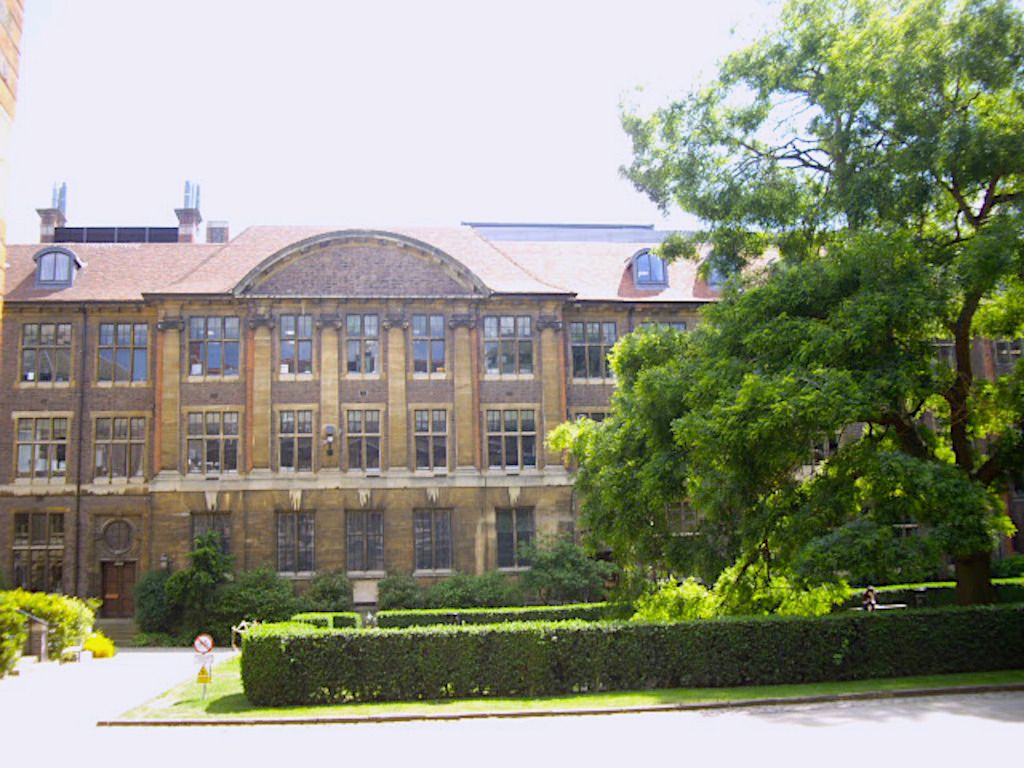
- Formation: 1904
- Purpose: Research and teaching in plant sciences
- Head of Department: Julian Hibberd
- Parent organization: University of Cambridge
- Website: www.plantsci.cam.ac.uk

The Department of Plant Sciences is a department of the University of Cambridge that conducts research and teaching in plant sciences. It was established in 1904, although the university has had a professor of botany since 1724.

== Research ==
As of 2017, the department pursues three strategic targets of research

1. Global food security
2. Synthetic biology and biotechnology
3. Climate science and ecosystem conservation

See also the Sainsbury Laboratory Cambridge University

== Notable academic staff ==
- Sir David Baulcombe, FRS, Regius Professor of Botany
- Beverley Glover, Professor of Plant systematics and evolution, director of the Cambridge University Botanic Garden
- Howard Griffiths, Professor of Plant Ecology
- Julian Hibberd, Professor of Photosynthesis
- Alison Smith, Professor of Plant Biochemistry and Head of Department

As of 2017, the department also has 66 members of faculty and postdoctoral researchers, 100 graduate students, 19 Biotechnology and Biological Sciences Research Council (BBSRC) Doctoral Training Program (DTP) PhD students, 20 part II Tripos undergraduate students and 44 support staff.

== History ==
The University of Cambridge has a long and distinguished history in Botany including work by John Ray and Stephen Hales in the 17th century and 18th century, Charles Darwin’s mentor John Stevens Henslow in the 19th century, and Frederick Blackman, Arthur Tansley and Harry Godwin in the 20th century.

=== Emeritus and alumni ===
More recently, the department has been home to:

- John C. Gray, Emeritus Professor of Plant Molecular Biology since 2011
- Thomas ap Rees, Professor of Botany
- F. Ian Woodward, Lecturer and Fellow of Trinity Hall, Cambridge before being appointed Professor of Plant Ecology at the University of Sheffield
