= Walkerian =

Walkerian is an eponym and may refer to:

- Richard Walker (philosopher) (1679–1764), professor of moral philosophy
- Alice Walker (born 1944), American author
