= Charles Hurst =

Charles Hurst may refer to:

- Charles Angas Hurst (1923–2011), Australian mathematical physicist
- Charles Chamberlain Hurst (1870–1947), English geneticist
