= Sarah Smith =

Sarah or Sara Smith may refer to:

== People ==
- Sarah Alexander (née Smith) (born 1971), British actress
- Sarah Bartley (1783–1850), British actress who used the name Smith
- Sarah J. Garnet (née Smith) (1831–1911), American suffragist and educator
- Sarah Jones (multi-instrumentalist), formerly Sarah Smith, former saxophonist in Cardiacs
- Sarah Smith Lay (18th century), English Quaker and wife of Benjamin Lay
- Sarah Stone (artist) (1760–1844), later Sarah Smith, English natural history illustrator and painter
- Saarah Smith (born 1999), South African cricketer
- Sarah Lanman Smith (1802–1836), American Christian missionary, memoirist, school founder
- Sarah Smith (children's writer) (1832–1911), English children's writer whose nom de plume was Hesba Stretton
- Sarah Bixby Smith (1871–1935), American writer
- Sarah K. Smith (1878 – after 1956), American artist and educator
- Sally E. Smith (Sarah Elizabeth Smith, 1941–2019), British-born Australian mycologist
- Sarah Smith (writer) (born 1947), American novelist of historical mysteries
- Sarah Smith (journalist) (born 1968), Scottish journalist
- Sarah Smith (director) (fl. from 1991), director of animated feature films Arthur Christmas and Ron's Gone Wrong
- Sarah Adina Smith (fl. from 2014), American writer, editor, and director
- Sarah Christine Smith, American actress
- Sarah Smith, member of British pop duo Same Difference
- Sarah Smith (politician), British member of parliament
- Sarah Jane Smith (golfer) (born 1984), Australian golfer
- Sarah Louise Smith, British micro-economist
- Sarah Milner Smith (1844–1939), American pioneer and teacher
- Sarah Smith Herford (née Smith) (1791–1831), English landscape painter and educator
- Sara Haines Smith Hoge (née Smith) (1864-1939), American temperance advocate

== Fiction ==
- Sarah Jane Smith, a character from the television series Doctor Who and the spin-off series The Sarah Jane Adventures
  - Sarah Jane Smith (audio drama series)
