= Reginald Cory =

Reginald Radcliffe Cory
- Born: 1871
- Died: 12 May 1934 (63)
- Known for: Horticulture
- Spouse: Rosa Kester

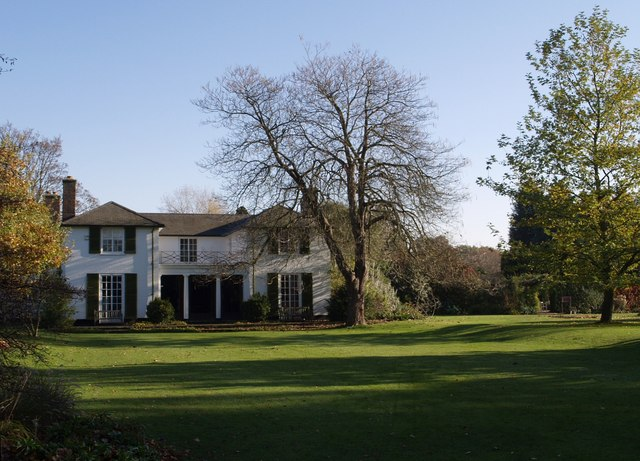
Cory Lodge, Cambridge Botanic Garden

Reginald Radcliffe Cory (1871 – 1934) was an influential British horticulturalist.

== Life ==
The third son of Sir John Cory, a shipping and coal magnate and philanthropist, he read law at Trinity College, Cambridge and inherited and developed his father's Welsh estate at Dyffryn after his father's death in 1910, together with landscape architect Thomas Mawson. Today it is a National Trust property. He had a passion for plants and botany and in the early 1930s he undertook a number of plant hunting expeditions, and commissioned others, some of the results of which are exhibited at Dyffryn. He would also share plants with other gardens, including the Cambridge Botanic Garden. Amongst other features, the gardens bear evidence of his trips to Italy.

Cory was a writer on horticulture, a researcher and liveryman of the Ancient Guild of Gardeners, and became a vice-president of the Royal Horticultural Society (RHS) and was a major benefactor of the Society, and other botanical resources including the Cambridge Botanic Garden, where his friend Humphrey Gilbert-Carter was Director. The residence of the Director, the construction of which he funded in 1924, is named Cory Lodge after him. Today it houses the Cory Library and Garden Herbarium. In 1930 he married Rosa Kester who worked at the Garden.

== Legacy ==
When he died in 1934 he bequeathed his collection of art and books to the RHS library, the Lindley Library, the largest bequest they had received. The bequest was catalogued by the new librarian, William Stearn. The balance of his estate went to the Cambridge Botanic Garden, and the Cory Fund continues to be an important source of revenue for the Garden, which also houses the Cory Laboratories. He is remembered by the RHS with the Cory Cup for Dahlias and Cory Memorial Cup.

== Selected publications ==
- The Horticultural Record 1914

== Bibliography ==
- Day, Juliet (February 2006). "Reginald Cory, Benefactor of Cambridge University Botanic Garden". Curtis's Botanical Magazine. 23 (1): 119–131. doi:10.1111/j.1355-4905.2006.00505.x.
- Donovan, Gerry (Winter 2005–2006). "Dyffryn Gardens and Arboretum: Restoration and the Centenary" (PDF). The Bulletin (41). Welsh Historic Gardens Trust: 1–2.
- Lacey, Pippa. "Changing Perspectives: a Garden through time". Cambridge University Botanic Garden.
- Walters, S.M. (1981). The shaping of Cambridge botany : a short history of whole-plant botany in Cambridge from the time of Ray into the present century. Cambridge University Press. ISBN 9780521237956.
