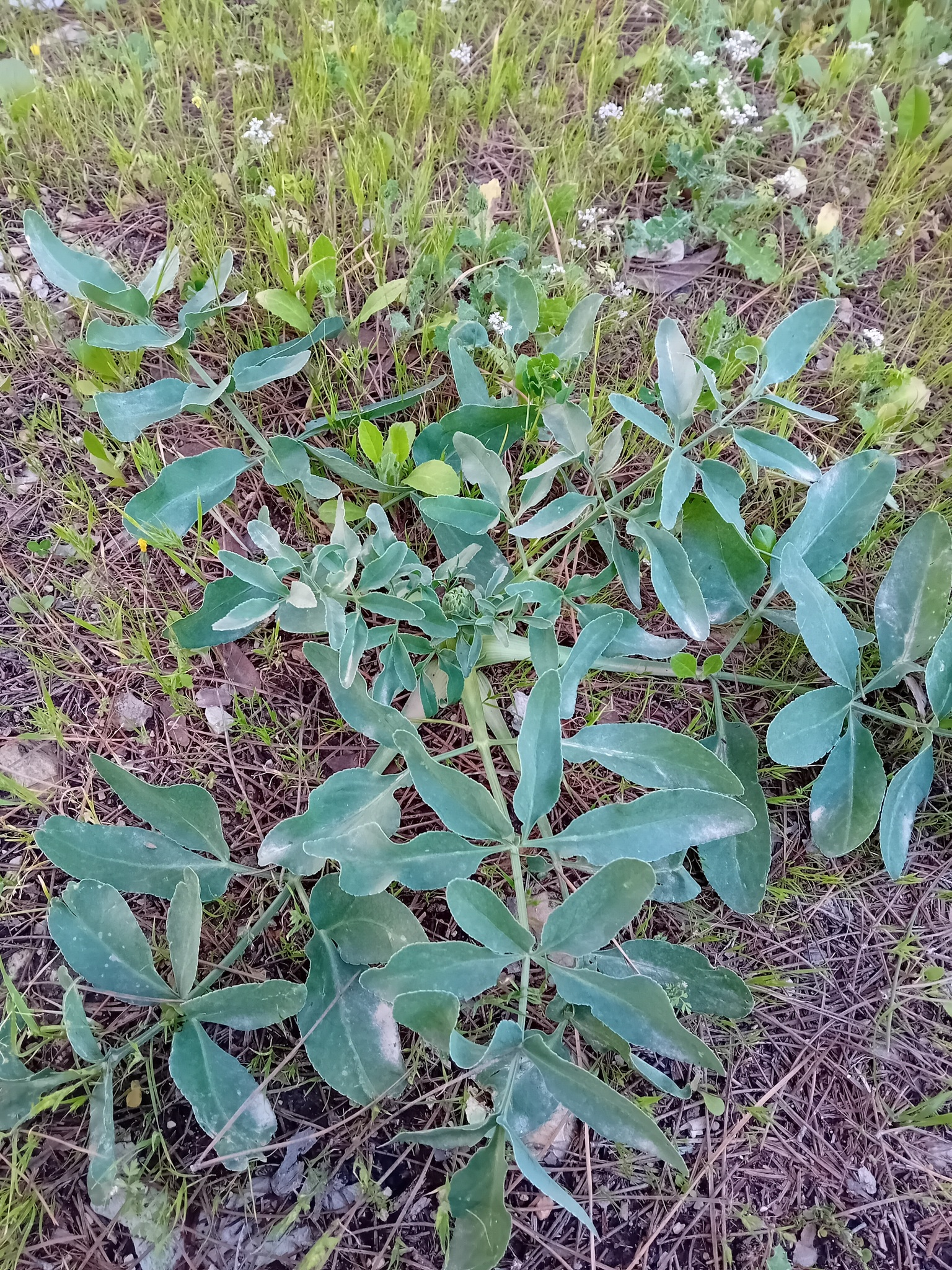

Scientific classification
- Kingdom: Plantae
- Clade: Tracheophytes
- Clade: Angiosperms
- Clade: Eudicots
- Clade: Asterids
- Order: Apiales
- Family: Apiaceae
- Genus: Heptaptera
- Species: H. anisopetala

Binomial name
- Heptaptera anisopetala (DC.) Tutin

= Heptaptera anisopetala =

Flowering plant

Heptaptera anisoptera is a flowering plant in the family Apiaceae.

== Description ==
It is an annual plant growing to 60–90 centimeters (2–3 feet). The leaves are sessile and are opposite, and sometimes rosette, dentate or serrated, and pinnate. The plant is a glycophyte. Its flowers are yellow, and form the inflorescence of terminal umbels, in umbelliform cymes. The fruit is a 10-40 mm long schizocarp with longitudinal ridges characteristic to the Apiaceae family.

== Range and habitat ==
It is found growing in shaded and hilly garrigue, also known as phrygana, of Israel.
