= Lucien Cuénot =

French biologist (1866–1951)

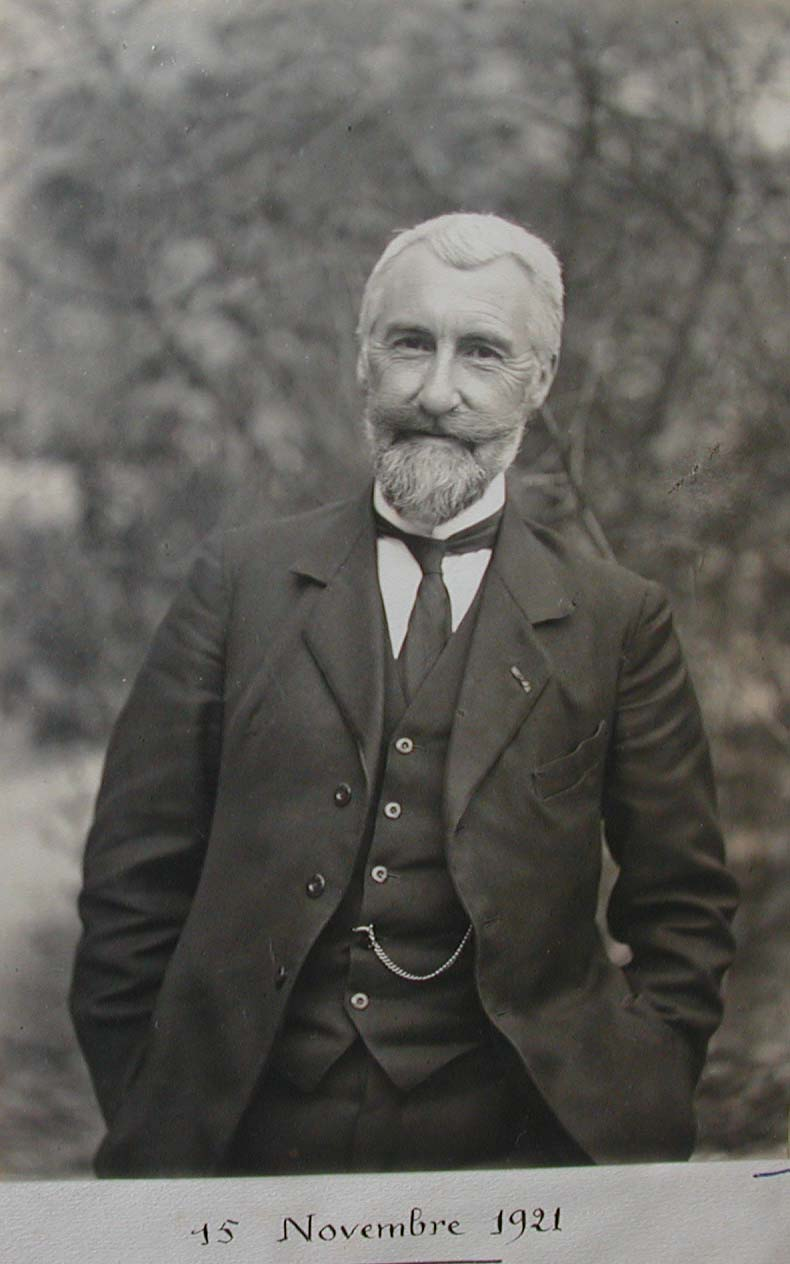
- Lucien Cuénot
- Born: 21 October 1866; Paris
- Died: 7 January 1951 (aged 84); Nancy, France
- Education: biologist
- Known for: multiple allelism at a genetic locus

Lucien Claude Marie Julien Cuénot (English: /kweɪˈnoʊ/ kway-NOH, French: [lysjɛ̃ kɥeno]; 21 October 1866 – 7 January 1951) was a French biologist. In the first half of the 20th century, Mendelism was not a popular subject among French biologists. Cuénot defied popular opinion and shirked the “pseudo-sciences” as he called them. Upon the rediscovery of Mendel's work by Correns, De Vries, and Tschermak, Cuénot proved that Mendelism applied to animals as well as plants.

== Cuénot's experiments ==
Cuénot spent two years working on mice and came to the conclusion that three “mnemons” (genes) are responsible for the production of one “chromogen” or pigment and two “distases” enzymes. The pigment (if present) is acted upon by the enzymes to produce black or yellow colour. If no pigment is present the result is an albino mouse. Cuénot studied the offspring of various crosses between mice and concluded that these “mnemons” or genes were inherited in a Mendelian fashion. Subsequently, Cuénot was the first person to describe multiple allelism at a genetic locus.

He also described a lethal mutation in the mouse agouti locus at a time when such a mutation was unheard of.

== Recognition ==
There is some argument over the degree of recognition of Cuénot's pioneering work in his own day, and up until the present.

Some scientists who were famous in Cuénot's day such as William Bateson, the man credited the "one gene one enzyme" hypothesis never recognized Cuénot's discovery that certain traits arose due to the presence or absence of an enzyme. Bateson did receive a letter from Charles Chamberlain Hurst in which he was urged to "read and digest the new Cuénot", work which explained some results in the field of mouse genetics, results which had been confusing for Bateson.

Other scientists who were well known in Cuénot's own day and still into the present day, such as Clarence Little and Sewall Wright, and William E. Castle did credit Cuénot with pioneering work in genetics.

For example, Clarence Little and William E. Castle did credit Cuénot with the discovery of the first lethal mutation.

The mouse geneticist Clarence Little credited Cuénot with the idea and first evidence for multiple allelism, and recognizing that the inheritance of white spotting in the mouse did not breed true.

The mouse and population geneticist Sewall Wright credited Cuénot with the discovery of multiple alleles and the one-gene one-enzyme hypothesis.

When writing Cuénot's obituary in 1951, Richard Goldschmidt credits Cuénot with the gene controlling enzyme hypothesis:

In 1903 he [Cuénot] already understood the genic (genetic) control of pigment in terms of chromogen (genes were responsible for the chromogen) and oxydase (enzyme).

John Cairns as recently as 2003 credited Lucien Cuénot with the one-gene one-enzyme hypothesis.

The entry on "Albino" in the Encyclopædia Britannica (11th, 1911) does fully appreciate Cuénot's work on the relationship between determinants (genes) and ferments (enzymes):

Before we can inquire into the cause and meaning of albinism it will be necessary first to consider the nature Of pigmentation... Subsequently (1903) L. Cuénot, in order to explain certain features in the hereditary transmission of coat colour in mice, postulated the hypothesis that the grey colour of the wild mouse (which is known to be a compound of black, chocolate and yellow pigments) may be due either to the interaction of a single ferment and three chromogens, or vice versa, to one chromogenic substance and three ferments... In spite of the inquiry being only in its initial stages, there is already good evidence to believe that Cuénot's theory is correct, and that an albino is an individual whose skin lacks the power to secrete either the ferment or the chromogen. It forms one but not both of these substances... Not only do albinos thus carry the determinants (genes) for pattern, but it has been known for some time that they also carry gametically, but never visible somatically, the determinants (genes) for either the ferment (enzyme) or the chromogen (substrate) for one or more colours. L. Cuénot was the first to show this for albino mice.

Cuénot's studies on mice were cut short when German troops invaded the town of Nancy, where he kept his mouse colony. After the First World War he never returned to his studies on mice and moved on to designing a theory of evolution, halfway between en vogue French Lamarckism and Darwinism.

== Selected publications ==
- L'Adaptation (1925)
- Le Transformisme [with Élie Gagnebin, Louis Marius Vialleton] (1927)
- La Genèse des espèces animals (1932)
- Variation et mutation en bactériologie (1932)
