= Thomas ap Rees =

British botanist (1930–1996)

- Born: October 19, 1930; Frome, Somerset
- Died: October 3, 1996 (aged 65)
- Education: University of Oxford (DPhil)
- Scientific career
- Fields: Biochemistry
- Workplaces: University of Sydney; CSIRO; University of Cambridge
- Thesis: The Effect of fungal infection upon the respoiratory metabolism of plant tissues (1957)
- Doctoral advisor: Jack Harley

Thomas ap Rees (19 October 1930 – 3 October 1996) was a botanist. He was Professor of Botany in the Department of Plant Sciences at the University of Cambridge between 1991 and 1996 when he has killed in a road accident whilst cycling home.

== Education and early life ==
He was born in Frome, Somerset and attended Llandovery College, Dyfed and served two years military service in the Royal Corps of Signals before studying botany at Lincoln College, Oxford gaining a Doctor of Philosophy degree in 1957 for research supervised by Jack Harley.

== Research and career ==
He lived in Sydney, Australia for a number of years as a lecturer in botany at the University of Sydney and in 1961 he was appointed as Senior Research Officer of the Commonwealth Scientific and Industrial Research Organisation. He returned to Britain in 1964 on being appointed a lecturer at the University of Cambridge.

Ap Rees' contribution to plant biochemistry was substantial. He published over 100 research papers and more than 20 reviews during his career. Over 170 scientists attended a meeting held after his death in honour of him and his work. His main area of research was in the regulation and control of plant metabolism. He argued that sucrose played a central role in plant metabolism. Much of his research was on non-crop species as he believed that there may be metabolic features present in these that could be bred into crop plants. Fellow scientists admired him for his sound approach to research.
