= William Bate Hardy =

British biologist (1864–1934)

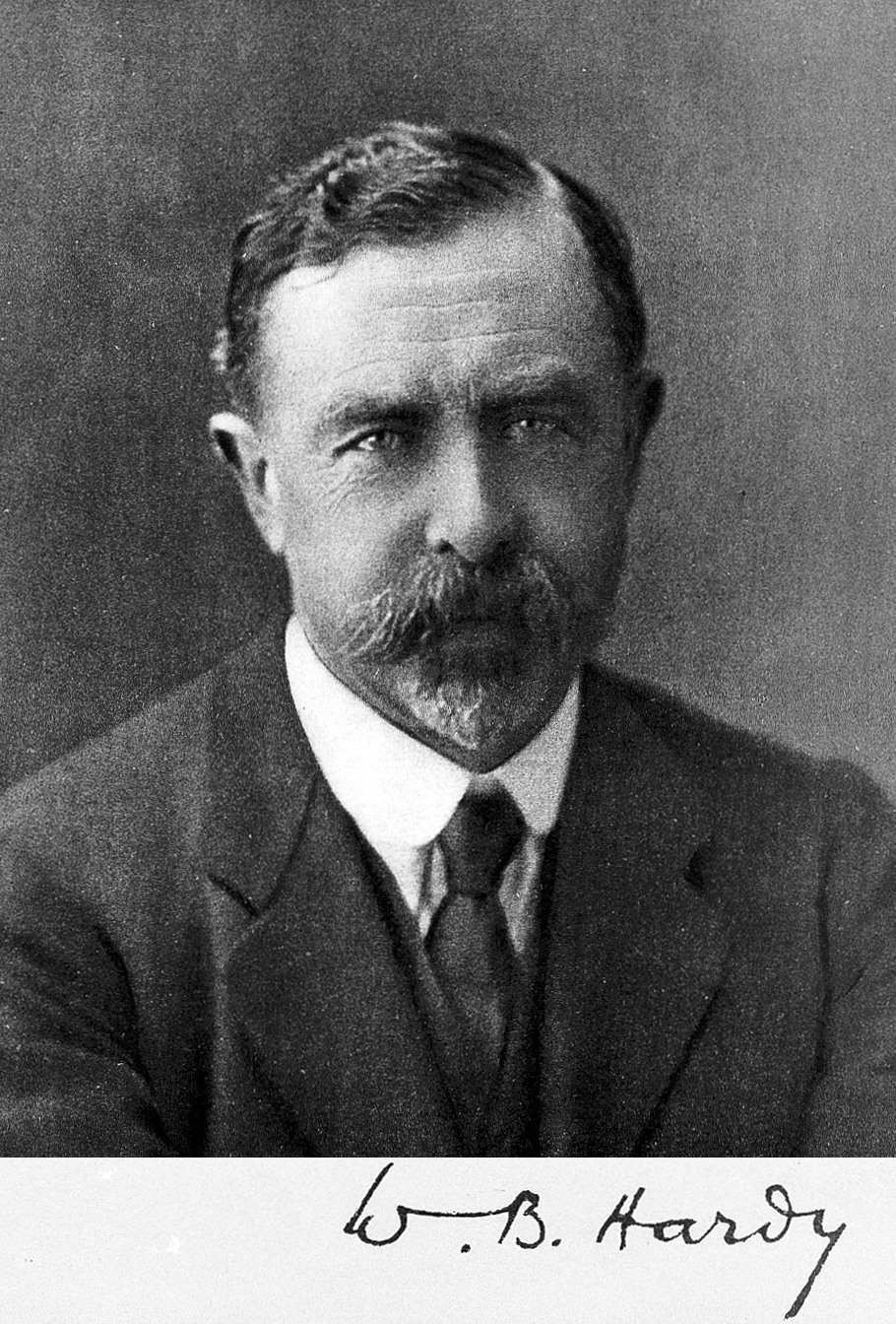

Sir William Bate Hardy, FRS (6 April 1864 – 23 January 1934) was a British biologist and food scientist. The William Bate Hardy Prize is named in his honour.

== Life ==
He was born in Erdington, a suburb of Birmingham, the son of William Hardy of Llangollen and his wife Sarah Bate. Educated at Framlingham College, he graduated with a Master of Arts from the University of Cambridge in 1888, where he carried out biochemical research. He first suggested the word hormone to E.H. Starling.

He was elected a Fellow of the Royal Society in June 1902, and delivered their Croonian Lecture in 1905, their Bakerian Lecture (jointly) in 1925 and won their Royal Medal in 1926. Hardy delivered the Guthrie lecture to the Physical Society in 1916.

In 1920 Hardy, in cooperation with Sir Walter Morley Fletcher, the secretary of the Medical Research Committee, persuaded the trustees of the Sir William Dunn legacy to use the money for research in biochemistry and pathology. To this end they funded Professor Sir Frederick Gowland Hopkins (1861–1947) in Cambridge with a sum of £210,000 in 1920 for the advancement of his work in biochemistry. Two years later they endowed Professor Georges Dreyer (1873–1934) of the Oxford University with a sum of £100,000 for research in pathology.

The money enabled each of the recipients to establish a chair and sophisticated teaching and research laboratories, the Sir William Dunn Institute of Biochemistry at Cambridge and the Sir William Dunn School of Pathology at Oxford. Between them, the two establishments have yielded ten Nobel Prize winners, including Hopkins, for the discovery of vitamins, and professors Howard Florey and Ernst Chain (Oxford), for their developmental work on penicillin.

Hardy also made significant contributions to the field of tribology. Alongside Ida Doubleday, he introduced the concept of boundary lubrication. Hardy was named as one of the 23 "Men of Tribology" by Duncan Dowson.

Hardy was knighted in 1925.

== Death ==
Hardy died at his home in Cambridge on 23 January 1934.

His long-time friend, Sir James Hopwood Jeans, elected as president of the British Science Association after Hardy's death, briefly eulogized him in the opening address to the Association's September 1934 meeting in Aberdeen:

[...] one man who will be in our thoughts in a very special sense to-night - Sir William Hardy, whom we had hoped to see in the presidential chair this year. [...] We all know of his distinguished work in pure science, and his equally valuable achievements in applied science. [Hardy was] one whom I was proud to call a friend for a large part of my life, and a colleague for many years.

— Sir James Jeans, 'The New World Picture of Modern Physics' (1934)

The journal, Nature, commented on his death in a two-page article, lamenting that, "science has lost a great captain and Great Britain a great public servant."

== Family ==
William Bate Hardy married Alice Mary Finch in Cambridge in 1898.
