= Roger Allen Leigh =

British botanist

Roger Allen Leigh is a British plant scientist. He is a former Professor of Botany, Cambridge University, where he was a fellow of Girton College. Between 2006 and 2010 he was head of school of Agriculture, Food & Wine at the University of Adelaide. He was then appointed as the Director of the Waite Research Institute at the University of Adelaide.
