= Louis Vialleton =

French zoologist and writer

Louis Marius Vialleton (December 22, 1859 - December 18, 1929) was a French zoologist and writer, best known for his advocation of non-Darwinian evolution.

== Career ==
Vialleton was born in Vienne, Isère. He was the first professor of histology in the faculty of medicine at the University of Montpellier. Vialleton rejected any form of continuous evolution and favoured saltationism.

Vialleton attempted to refute gradual transformism from a morphological perspective in his work Morphologie générale Membres et ceintures des vertébrés tétrapodes: Critique morphotogique du transformisme (1924). Zoologist Étienne Rabaud responded with a critical article.

He contributed the chapter Morphologie et transformisme to the book Le Transformisme (1927). Vialleton's views were often misrepresented by creationists as anti-evolutionary. His writings were influential to creationists such as Douglas Dewar. However, he did not reject evolution. He was also incorrectly described as a critic of evolution by A. Morley Davies.

Vialleton was a vitalist.

== Publications ==
- Un monstre double humain du genre Ectopage (1892)
- Un Problème de l'Évolution: La Théorie de la Récapitulation des Formes Ancestrales au Cours du Développement Embryonnaire (Loi Biogénétique Fondamentale de Haeckel) (1908)
- Éléments de Morphologie des Vertébrés Anatomie et Embryologie Comparées, Paléontologie et Classification (1911)
- Membres et ceintures des Vertébrés Tétrapodes: Critique morphologique du transformisme (1924)
- Morphologie générale Membres et ceintures des vertébrés tétrapodes: Critique morphotogique du transformisme (1924)
- Le Transformisme (1927) [with Élie Gagnebin, Lucien Cuénot, William Robin Thompson, Roland Dalbiez]
- L'origine Des Etres Vivants, L'illusion Transformiste (1929)

== See also ==
- The eclipse of Darwinism
