= Humphrey Gilbert-Carter =

British botanist (1884–1969)

- Born: 19 October 1884
- Died: 4 January 1969 (aged 84)
- Education: Tonbridge School, Edinburgh University
- Known for: Botany
- Scientific career
- Institutions: Cambridge Botanic Garden, Cambridge University

Humphrey Gilbert-Carter (1884–1969) was a British botanist and the first scientific director of the Cambridge Botanic Garden (1921–1950), being succeeded by John Gilmour. He published a guide to the botanic garden, and a guide to writing descriptive labels for botanic gardens. One of his students, Donald Piggott, would later become a professor in the Botany School, and director of the garden.

== Life ==
The second son of the colonial governor Sir Thomas Gilbert-Carter and Susan Laura Hocker, Gilbert-Carter was educated at Tonbridge School and Edinburgh University. After further studies at Marburg University and Cambridge University, he served as a botanist on the Botanical Survey of India during the First World War.

In 1921 Gilbert-Carter returned to Cambridge to take up his position as Director of the University Botanic Garden and Curator of the Herbarium at the Botany School where he taught at the age of 37. Within a year he had published his first book, Guide To The Botanic Garden Cambridge (1922, and updated in 1927), followed by his Descriptive Labels for Botanic Gardens (1924), which was indicative of the high standards he set for accurate labels. The gardens were much depleted, because of the war but his friendship with Reginald Cory, a fellow alumnus, resulted in considerable funding including the building of Cory Lodge as a residence for the Director.

Amongst Gilbert-Carter's students, Donald Piggott would later become a professor in the Botany School, and director of the garden (1984–1995). Gilbert-Carter is remembered by the Gilbert Carter Woodland in the Garden.

== Bibliography ==
- Lacey, Pippa (23 May 2013). "Changing Perspectives: a Garden through time". Cambridge University Botanic Garden.
- Walters, S.M. (1981). The shaping of Cambridge botany: a short history of whole-plant botany in Cambridge from the time of Ray into the present century. Cambridge University Press. ISBN 9780521237956.
- CUBG. "Cambridge University Botanic Garden". Cambridge University.
- Godwin, H (1970). "Humphrey Gilbert-Carter" (obituary). Watsonia. 8: 71–74.
- Gilbert-Carter, Humphrey (1922). Guide to the University Botanic Garden Cambridge. Cambridge University Press. ISBN 9781107643178.
