= E. F. Warburg =

English botanist

Edmund Frederic "Heff" Warburg (22 March 1908 – 9 June 1966) was an English botanist, known as the co-author of two important British floras. The standard author abbreviation E.F.Warb. is used to indicate this person as the author when citing a botanical name.

== Early life and education ==
Warburg was born in London on 22 March 1908, son of Sir Oscar Emanuel Warburg, businessman and later chairman of the London County Council, and his wife, Catherine née Byrne. His father was a member of the distinguished German–Jewish Warburg family that included botanist Otto Warburg and Otto Heinrich Warburg the Nobel Prize–winning physiologist.

His father was an enthusiastic amateur botanist, and the garden of their house at Headley, Surrey, contained a large collection of plants, particularly Cistus, Berberis, and oaks. Warburg went to school at Marlborough College, then won a scholarship in mathematics to Trinity College, Cambridge. He transferred to natural sciences and was subsequently elected a senior scholar. In 1930 he was awarded a first class in part two of the natural sciences tripos, with botany as his main subject.

While still an undergraduate, he went on a botanical expedition with Tom Tutin and others to the Azores, some results of which they published in 1932. Warburg was responsible for the introduction to cultivation of Daboecia cantabrica ssp. azorica, a plant new to science. He was also at this time developing his lifelong interest in the bryophytes. Before graduating, Warburg collaborated with his father in writing an account of the genus Cistus. Meanwhile, he prepared a thesis on the cytotaxonomy of the Geraniales, on the strength of which he was made a research fellow of Trinity in 1933 and was awarded his PhD in 1937. He was elected as a fellow of the Linnean Society in 1934.

== Career ==
In 1938 Warburg became assistant lecturer at Bedford College, London, but during the war in 1941 he joined the Royal Air Force and was attached to the photographic interpretation unit at RAF Medmenham in Buckinghamshire. After the war, he returned to Bedford College, then in 1948 moved to the department of botany at Oxford as demonstrator in botany and curator of the herbarium. Here his first task was to move of the herbarium from the house of its founder, George Claridge Druce, in Crick Road to the newly built botany school.

He developed the reputation of a patient teacher and a dedicated field botanist, with a wide knowledge of the British flora. He joined with Arthur Roy Clapham and Tom Tutin in writing the Flora of the British Isles (1952, 1962), the first comprehensive scientific flora of Britain to be produced for seventy years, which became the standard work on the subject. A briefer Excursion Flora (1959) from the same authors was equally successful. In 1964 he was made reader in plant taxonomy at Oxford and elected a fellow of New College.

From 1946 he was an active member of the Botanical Society of the British Isles. He was a member of its council, and from 1949 to 1960 he was editor of its journal, Watsonia. In 1960 he was elected an honorary member and was president from 1965 until his death. From 1946 he had been a recorder of mosses for the British Bryological Society and was its president from 1962 to 1963. In 1963 he edited for them the third edition of A Census Catalogue of British Mosses. His name is also commemorated in a moss, Molendoa warburgii.

He was active with botanical advice outside the academic world. He was a founder member of the Berkshire, Buckinghamshire and Oxfordshire Naturalists' Trust and later a vice-president; one of their properties, rich in interesting flora, was in 1967 named the Warburg Reserve in his memory. He advised the Oxford Preservation Trust and Oxford city on trees and shrubs; the city council named Warburg Crescent after him in 1969.

== Personal life ==
Warburg was generally known by colleagues and friends as "Heff", partly in punning references to his initials "E. F." but also with the suggestion of Heffalump, for he was physically a big man.

In 1948 he married Primrose Barrett. They had two sons and a daughter. He died from heart disease in the Radcliffe Infirmary, Oxford, on 9 June 1966.

== Sources ==
- "The Oxford Dictionary of National Biography". Oxford Dictionary of National Biography (online ed.). Oxford University Press. 2004. doi:10.1093/ref:odnb/36724. (Subscription or UK public library membership required.)
- obituary at bsbi
