= Donald Pigott =

British botanist (1928–2022)

Christopher Donald Pigott
- Born: 7 April 1928
- Died: 11 September 2022 (aged 94); Cartmel, Cumbria, England
- Education: Cambridge University
- Known for: Tilia
- Spouse: Sheila Megaw
- Scientific career
- Fields: Botany, Plant physiology
- Institutions: Cambridge University Botanic Garden, Cambridge University Botany School
- Author abbrev. (botany): Pigott

Christopher Donald Pigott (7 April 1928 – 11 September 2022) was a British botanist who was the fourth Director, Cambridge University Botanic Garden (1984–1995), succeeding Max Walters.

== Life and career ==
Pigott was born on 7 April 1928. He was educated at Emmanuel College, Cambridge, from 1946, where he was taught by two previous Directors, Humphrey Gilbert-Carter (1921–1950) and Max Walters (1973–1983). Forming a friendship with the latter he was persuaded to spend the summer of 1949 in Uppsala and Helsinki universities where he was impressed by the mapping of the Scandinavian flora and returned to work with Walters on similar projects for the British Isles and used this method in his PhD thesis on Thyme. Under Professor Harry Godwin he also worked on the design of the Botanic Garden's ecological mound.

After leaving Cambridge he moved to Sheffield University as Lecturer in Botany. He returned to Cambridge in 1984 to become Director of the Garden. On leaving Cambridge in 1995 he was succeeded by John Parker and was appointed to the chair in Biology at Lancaster University and subsequently as Emeritus professor. He married fellow Cambridge botanist Sheila Megaw with whom he collaborated.

Pigott died in Cartmel, Cumbria on 11 September 2022, at the age of 94.

== Work ==
During Pigott's tenure as Director, the great storm of 1987 caused considerable damage to the Garden. In 1990 the University carried out a review which suggested the research aspects of the garden were of decreasing relevance as plant sciences shifted in emphasis from whole plant botany to the cellular and molecular level. Pigott vigorously and successfully defended the Garden's scientific value.

Pigott was known for his work on the genus Tilia (lime trees, Malvaceae), and was the botanical authority for several taxa in that genus, such as:

- Tilia amurensis subsp. taquetii (C.K. Schneid.) Pigott
- Tilia dasystyla subsp. caucasica (V.Engl.) Pigott

Pigott also carried out a number of botanical expeditions with his wife and with Anthony Hall.

== Selected publications ==
- Pigott, Donald (2012). Lime-trees and basswood: a biological monograph of the genus Tilia. Cambridge: Cambridge University Press. ISBN 9780521840545.

== Bibliography ==
- Lacey, Pippa. "Changing Perspectives: a Garden through time". Cambridge University Botanic Garden.
  - "Professor C.D. Pigott - List of publications" (PDF)., in Lacey (2016)
- "Contributors". New Scientist (14): 43. 21 February 1957.
- "Pigott, Christopher Donald". Harvard University Herbaria & Libraries: Index of Botanists. 2015.
- "Tropicos". Missouri Botanical Garden. 2015.
- "Pigott, Christopher Donald (1928-)". International Plant Names Index. 2005.
