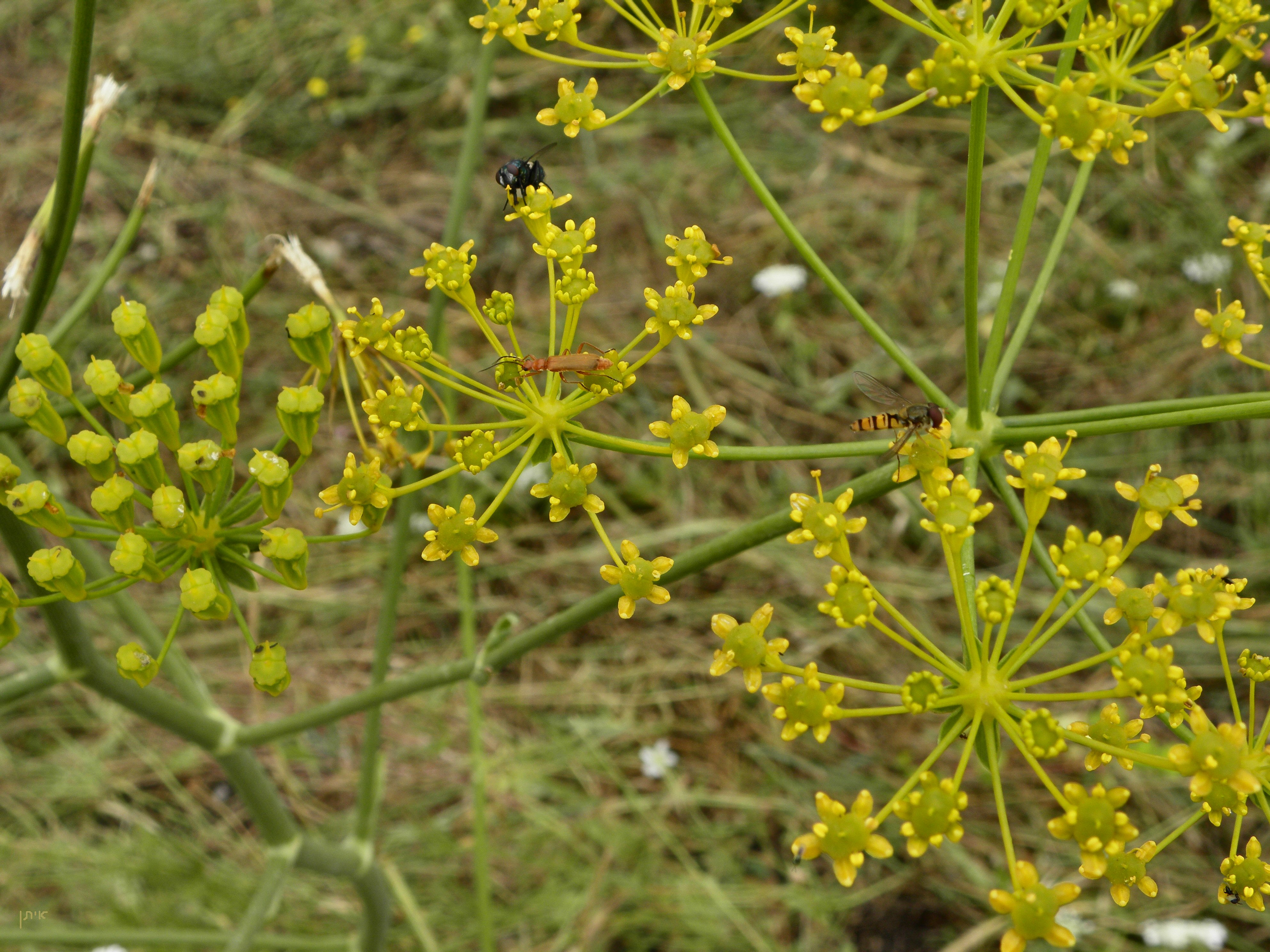
- Heptaptera anisoptera

Scientific classification
- Kingdom: Plantae
- Clade: Tracheophytes
- Clade: Angiosperms
- Clade: Eudicots
- Clade: Asterids
- Order: Apiales
- Family: Apiaceae
- Subfamily: Apioideae
- Genus: Heptaptera; Margot & Reut.

= Heptaptera =

Genus of plants

Heptaptera is a genus of flowering plants belonging to the family Apiaceae.

Its native range is Southeastern Europe to Iran.

Species:

- Heptaptera alata (Boiss.) Tutin
- Heptaptera anatolica (Boiss.) Tutin
- Heptaptera angustifolia (Bertol.) Tutin
- Heptaptera anisopetala (DC.) Tutin
- Heptaptera cilicica (Boiss. & Balansa) Tutin
- Heptaptera colladonioides Margot & Reut.
- Heptaptera macedonica (Bornm.) Tutin
- Heptaptera triquetra (Vent.) Tutin
