= William Bate Hardy Prize =

The William Bate Hardy Prize is awarded by the Cambridge Philosophical Society. It is awarded once in three years “for the best original memoir, investigation or discovery by a member of the University of Cambridge in connection with Biological Science that may have been published during the three years immediately preceding”.

== Recipients ==
(incomplete list-prize awarded at least 22 times by 2014)

- 1966 Hugh Huxley (inaugural winner)
- 1969 Sydney Brenner and Ralph Riley
- 1976 Frederick Sanger
- 1978 Richard Henderson
- 1981 César Milstein
- 1984 John Gurdon
- 1987 Michael Berridge
- 1991 Azim Surani
- 1993 Martin Evans
- 1995 Nicholas Barry Davies
- 1998 Tim Clutton-Brock and Andrew Wyllie (shared)
- 2001 Michael Neuberger and James Cuthbert Smith (shared)
- 2004 Andrea Brand and Robin Irvine (shared)
- 2010 Beverley Glover, Dr Peter Forster and Simon Conway Morris (shared)
- 2014 Serena Nik-Zainal

== See also ==
- List of biology awards
