= Jack Harley =

British academic (1911–1990)

Jack Harley CBE FRS FLS FIBiol
- Born: John Laker Harley; 17 November 1911; Charlton, London
- Died: 12 December 1990 (aged 79)
- Awards: FRS (1964); CBE (1979); Linnean Medal (1989)
- Scientific career
- Fields: Botany
- Institutions: University of Oxford
- Doctoral students: Thomas ap Rees

John Laker Harley CBE FRS FLS FIBiol (17 November 1911 – 12 December 1990) was a British botanist, known for his work on ectomycorrhizal physiology.

== Early life, education, and war service ==
Harley was born at Old Charlton, then in Kent, in 1911, to Edith Sarah (née Smith) and Charles Laker Harley, a Post Office civil servant. He attended Leeds Grammar School and was awarded an exhibition to Wadham College, University of Oxford, going up to read botany in 1930. There he was taught by A. G. Tansley and became interested in ecology and plant physiology. His D.Phil. thesis was on mycorrhizas, supervised by W. H. Wilkins. In 1939, he was appointed demonstrator in botany, but his research was interrupted by the war. He joined the Royal Signals Corps and served in India, Burma and Ceylon (1940–45), attaining the rank of lieutenant-colonel.

== Career ==
After the war he was appointed a fellow of Queen's College (1946). In 1958 he transferred to the department of agriculture and restarted his work on mycorrhiza. In 1962 he was appointed to a readership in plant nutrition. He was a professor of botany at Sheffield University (1965–69). With Howard Florey, he was involved in writing the Florey Report on the structure of Oxford's biology departments in 1966, and returned to Oxford to hold the newly renamed chair of forest science (1969–1979), overseeing the amalgamation of the forestry and agriculture departments. The chair was associated with a fellowship at St John's College. In retirement he co-wrote the book Mycorrhizal Symbiosis with his daughter Sally E. Smith (1983) and A Check-list of Mycorrhiza in the British Flora with his wife (1987).

He was a co-editor of the New Phytologist (1961–83). He was elected a fellow of the Royal Society (1964), and received the CBE (1979) and the Linnean Society's Gold Medal for Botany (1989). He was president of the British Mycological Society (1969), the British Ecological Society (1970–72) and the Institute of Biology (1984–86).

== Personal life ==
In 1938, he married E. Lindsay Fitt, a fellow student at Oxford who also worked for a D.Phil. They had a son and a daughter. Harley died in 1990.

== Selected publications ==
- John Laker Harley, J. S. Waid (1955). "A method of studying active mycelia on living roots and other surfaces in the soil", Transactions of the British Mycological Society 38: 104–118 doi:10.1016/S0007-1536(55)80022-8 – "a Citation Classic"
