= Ralph Riley =

British geneticist

Sir Ralph Riley FRS
- Born: 23 October 1924; Scarborough, North Riding of Yorkshire
- Died: 27 August 1999 (aged 74); Cambridge
- Education: Sheffield University
- Known for: Improving wheat production
- Spouse: Joan Norrington
- Children: Two daughters
- Awards: William Bate Hardy Prize, 1969; Royal Medal, 1981; Wolf Foundation Prize in Agriculture, 1986; knighthood, 1984
- Scientific career
- Fields: Cytogenetics of wheat
- Institutions: Plant Breeding Institute, Cambridge; Agriculture and Food Research Council

Sir Ralph Riley FRS (23 October 1924 – 27 August 1999) was a British geneticist.

He was born in Scarborough, North Riding of Yorkshire in 1924 and served in the army during the Second World War. After the war he studied Botany at Sheffield University, followed by a two-year PhD study in genetics.

He was then recruited by the Plant Breeding Institute (PBI) at Cambridge to study the introduction of useful variation into the wheat crop from its wild relatives. Two years later in 1954 Riley became the founder and first Head of the Cytogenetics Department at the PBI. His target was to increase the wheat gene pool by making the variation in wild relatives available to wheat breeders. In 1957, he discovered the method of doing so by finding the Ph gene. This gene controlled the pairing between the chromosomes of wheat and wild relatives of wheat and soon he was able to demonstrate the cytogenetic ways by which useful genes, such as those that confer novel disease resistances, could be transferred into wheat from a host of wild species. This discovery of the Ph gene allowed the first "genetic engineering" and his methods have since been used around the world in all major cereal breeding programmes.

In 1972, he became Director of the PBI and during his six years as Director strove to improve production in UK arable agriculture, developing fundamental research programmes on breeding and introducing plant molecular biology in the UK. He thus ensured that the PBI's pre-eminence in the application of science to plant breeding. During his directorship wheat yields increased from four tonnes per hectare to 6 t/ha, due in large part to the improved PBI varieties. This was particularly vital at a time when the UK needed to be less reliant on North American imports.

In 1978 Ralph Riley left the PBI to become Secretary (chief executive) of the Agriculture and Food Research Council (now the Biotechnology and Biological Sciences Research Council), where he served as Secretary for seven years and Deputy-Chairman for a further two.

He was elected as a Fellow of the Royal Society in 1967. He was awarded the William Bate Hardy Prize in 1969 and the Royal Medal in 1981. and the Wolf Foundation Prize in Agriculture in 1986. He was knighted for his services to science in 1984.

He married Joan Norrington in 1949; they had two daughters. He died in Cambridge on 27 August 1999.
