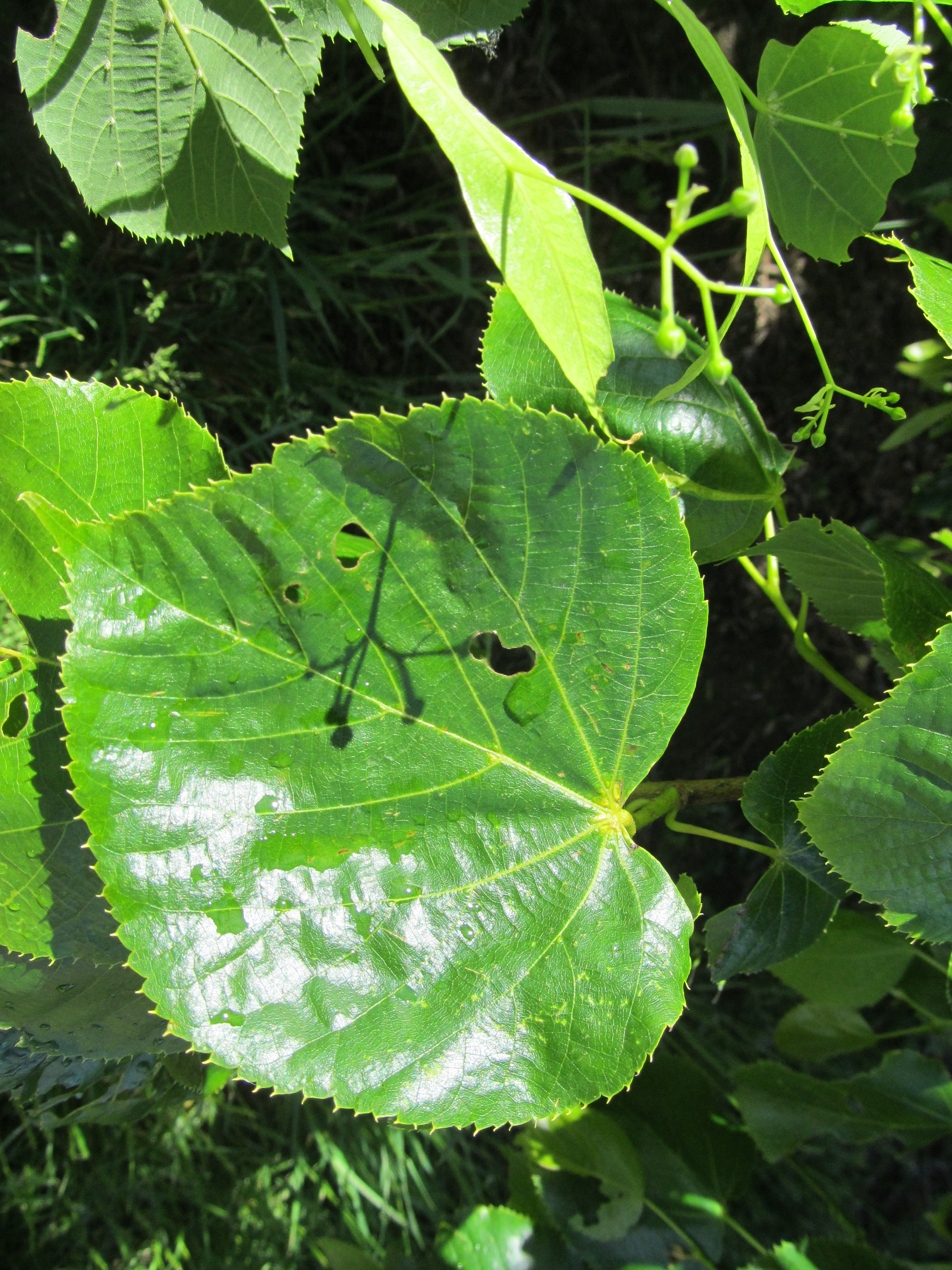

Scientific classification
- Kingdom: Plantae
- Clade: Tracheophytes
- Clade: Angiosperms
- Clade: Eudicots
- Clade: Rosids
- Order: Malvales
- Family: Malvaceae
- Genus: Tilia
- Species: T. dasystyla

Binomial name
- Tilia dasystyla Steven

= Tilia dasystyla =

Species of tree

Tilia dasystyla is a deciduous lime tree species. It contains the following subspecies:

- T. dasystyla subsp. caucasica (V.Engl.) Pigott (syn. T. begoniifolia, T. caucasica, T. platyphyllos subsp. caucasica, T. rubra var. begoniifolia, T. rubra subsp. caucasica) – northern Iran, northern and western Turkey, Caucasus, and Crimea
- T. dasystyla subsp. dasystyla – Crimea
