= Richard Walker (philosopher) =

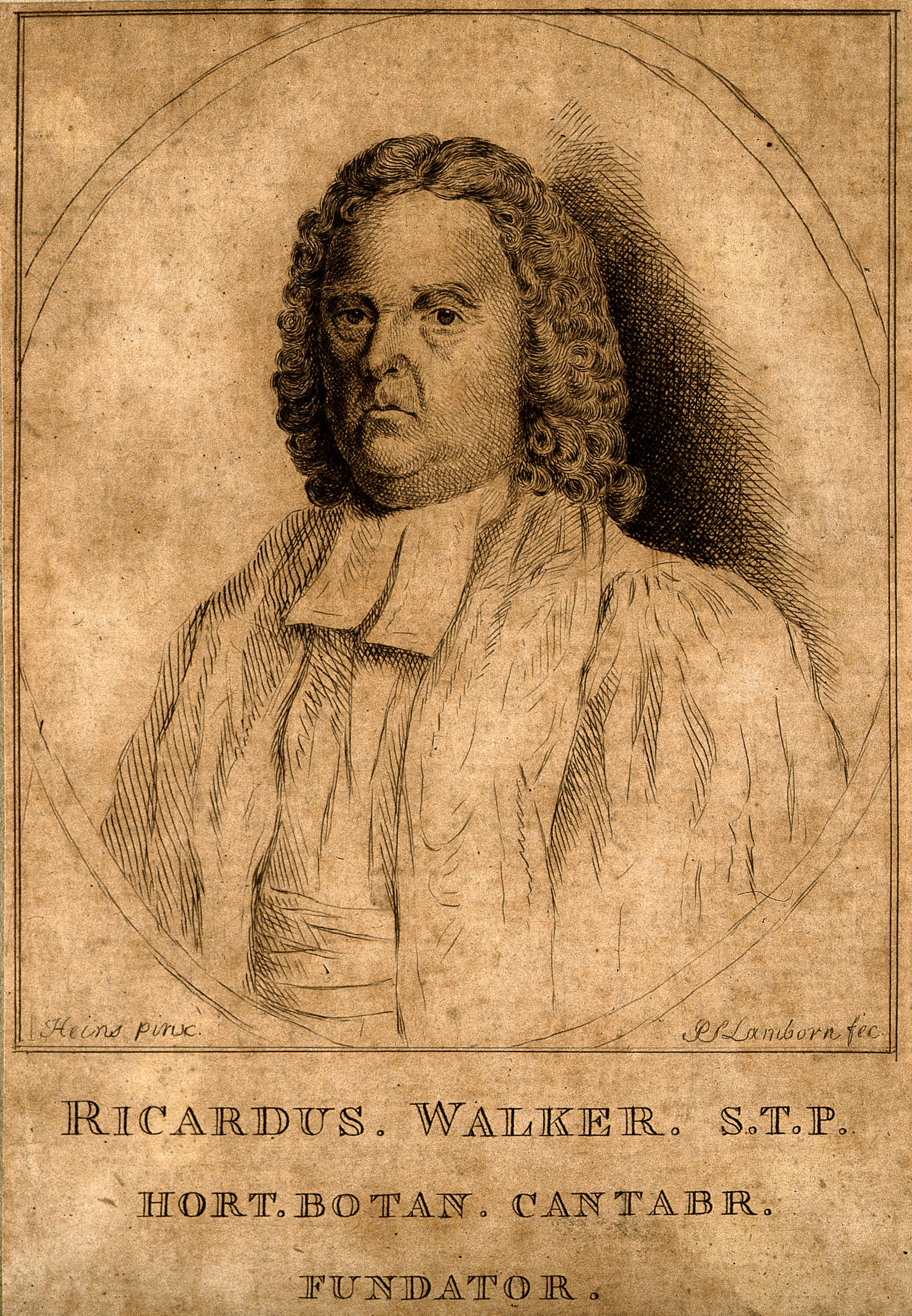
Portrait. Credit: Wellcome Library

Richard Walker (1679 – 15 December 1764) was a professor of moral philosophy at the University of Cambridge, noted as a supporter of Richard Bentley in his long legal battle with the fellowship of Trinity College. He served as Vice Master of Trinity in 1734. He was keenly interested in gardening and involved in the establishment of the botanic garden at Cambridge.

== Life ==
Walker was born in North Riding, Yorkshire, son of Robert Walker, of Tanfield. After early study at Tanfield he was educated at Trinity College, Cambridge, graduating Bachelor of Arts (BA) in 1706, Cambridge Master of Arts (MA Cantab) in 1710, Bachelor of Divinity (BD) in 1724, and Doctor of Divinity (DD) per regias literas in 1728. He was elected a Fellow of Trinity, but in 1708 left Cambridge to serve a curacy at Upwell in Norfolk. In 1717 Richard Bentley, who had a difference with the junior bursar, John Myers, removed him, and recalled Walker to Cambridge to fill his place. From this time a friendship began between Walker and Bentley, and Walker helped Bentley in his struggle within the college. On 27 April 1734 Bentley was sentenced by the college Visitor, Thomas Green, bishop of Ely, to be deprived of the mastership of Trinity College. On the resignation of John Hacket, the vice-master, on 17 May 1734, Walker was appointed to his place, and refused to carry out the bishop's sentence. On 25 June 1735, at the instance of John Colbatch, a senior fellow, the court of king's bench granted a mandamus addressed to Walker, requiring him to execute the sentence or to show cause for not doing so. Walker, in reply, questioned the title of the bishop to the office of general visitor, and the affair dragged on until 1736, when Green's death put an end to the attempts of Bentley's opponents. Walker was the companion of Bentley's old age, and was introduced by Alexander Pope into the Dunciad' with his patron.

In 1744 Walker was appointed Knightbridge professor of moral philosophy at Cambridge, and in 1745 he was nominated rector of Thorpland in Norfolk, a living which he exchanged in 1757 for that of Upwell. He was devoted to horticulture, and had a small garden within the precincts of Trinity College which was famous for exotic plants, including the pineapple, banana, coffee shrub, logwood tree, and torch thistle, which, with the aid of a hothouse, he was able to raise. On 16 July 1760 he purchased land from Richard Whish, a vintner, and on 25 Aug. 1762 conveyed the principal part to the university in trust for the establishment of the Cambridge University Botanic Garden which occupied the site until its move one mile south in 1846. In 1763 he published anonymously A Short Account of the late Donation of a Botanic Garden to the University of Cambridge. He died at Cambridge, unmarried, on 15 December 1764. His bequest allowed the appointment of Thomas Martyn as reader in botany and Charles Miller as curator of the botanic garden.

== Other sources ==
This article incorporates text from a publication now in the public domain: "Walker, Richard". Dictionary of National Biography. London: Smith, Elder & Co. 1885–1900.
