= Tom Tutin =

British botanist (1908–1987)

Thomas Gaskell Tutin, FRS (21 April 1908 – 7 October 1987) was Professor of Botany at the University of Leicester and co-author of Flora of the British Isles and Flora Europaea.

== Early life ==
Tutin was born on 21 April 1908 in Kew, Surrey, son of Frank Tutin, a biochemist at the Lister Institute, and his wife, Jane Ardern. He was educated at Cotham Grammar School, Bristol, then won a scholarship to Downing College, Cambridge, where he studied Biological Sciences. In 1929, while still an undergraduate, he went on a botanical expedition to Madeira and the Azores, afterwards publishing two papers on the results of his studies there.

After graduating in 1930 he stayed in Cambridge, interrupted by biological expeditions in 1931 to southern Spain and Spanish Morocco, and in 1933 to British Guiana, where the expedition was based on the banks of the Essequibo River. After that trip he moved to Plymouth to work in the laboratory of the Marine Biological Association, researching a disease of eel grass. In 1937 he joined the Percy Sladen Trust expedition to Lake Titicaca, resulting in a significant publication on the development and stability of lake plant communities.

After a short period as a demonstrator at King's College London, he became an assistant lecturer at the University of Manchester. There, in addition to teaching and fire-watching duties occasioned by the War, he developed his interests in lake algae begun during the Titicaca expedition. This led to visits to the research station of the Freshwater Biological Association near Windermere, where he met his future wife. In early 1942 Tutin joined the geographical section of the Admiralty's Naval Intelligence Division in Cambridge, which was producing a series of geographical handbooks for military use. Tutin's part in this was to survey the fenlands of the north of England for buckthorn, whose charcoal was used in certain shell fuses.

== Leicester ==
In 1944 Tutin was appointed lecturer in charge of the department of botany at University College, Leicester, and in 1947 he became the first professor of botany there. The college became the University of Leicester in 1957. Apart from his teaching and administrative duties, Tutin's interest now turned to taxonomy. Sir Arthur Tansley had drawn his attention to the need for a new British flora, and Tutin began a collaboration with Arthur Roy Clapham and E. F. Warburg, to write the 1591-page Flora of the British Isles, published in 1952, which quickly came to be regarded as the standard work on the subject. A briefer Excursion Flora from the same authors was equally successful. Emboldened by this success, Tutin's ambitions turned to wider geographical areas. At the eighth International Botanical Congress, in Paris in 1954, the need for a flora of Europe was identified, and a group of British botanists formed an editorial committee, with Tutin as chairman, which spent the next twenty and more years in collating and publishing the massive Flora Europaea.

He was President of the Botanical Society of the British Isles from 1957 to 1961. He retired from his professorship at the age of 65 in 1973, but continued to be active in Flora Europaea and other work. In 1977 he was awarded the Gold Medal of the Linnean Society of London. The University of Dublin awarded him an honorary ScD degree in 1979 (his first and only doctorate). In 1982 he was elected a Fellow of the Royal Society.

== Family ==
In 1942 he married a palaeoecologist, Winifred Pennington (1915–2007). They had a son and three daughters. Tutin died in Leicester on 7 October 1987.

== Bibliography ==
- Stace, Clive A. (July 1988). "Obituaries:Thomas Gaskell Tutin" (PDF). Watsonia. 17 (2): 210–214.
