= Sarah Louise Smith =

British micro-economist

Sarah Louise Smith OBE
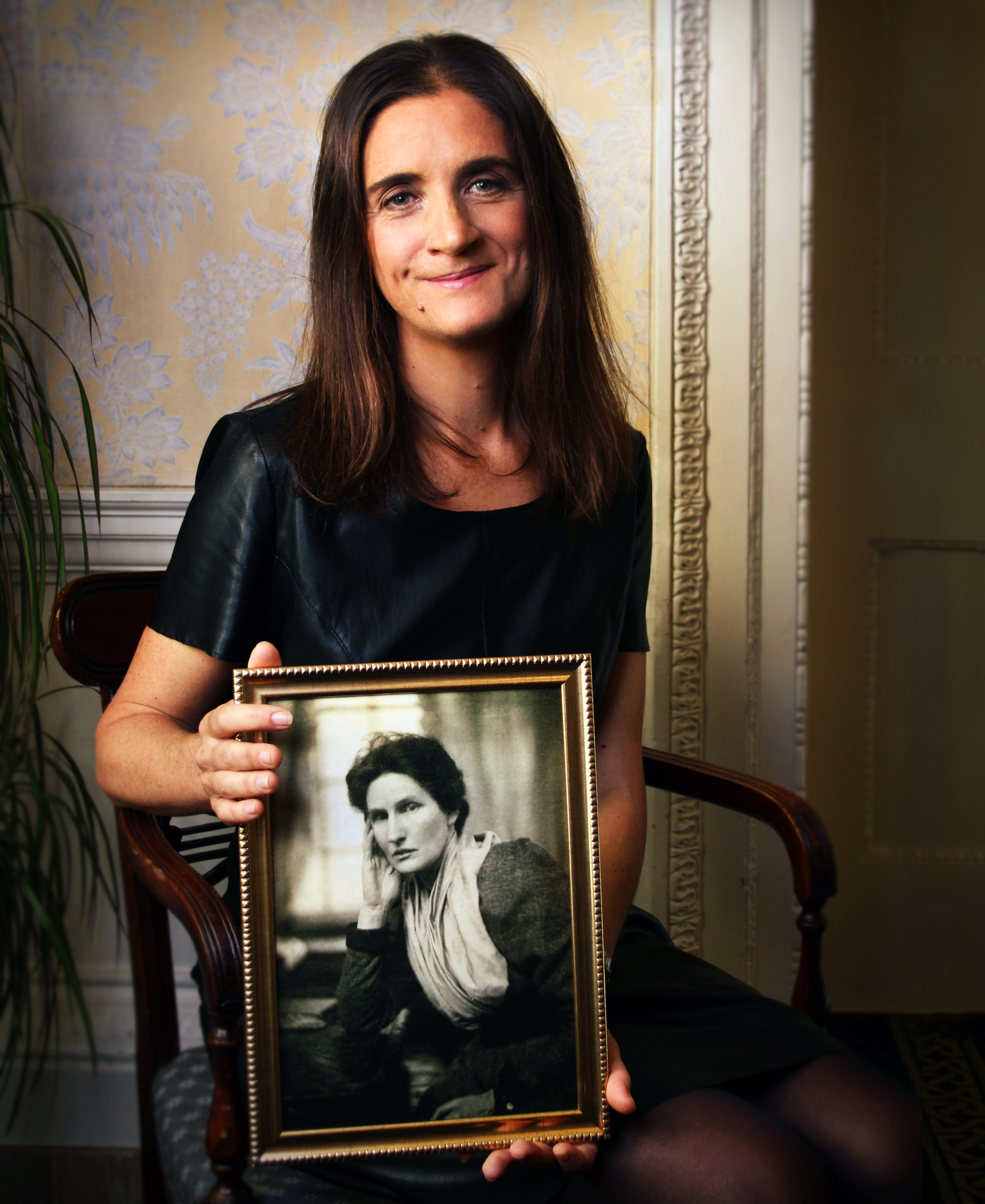
- Smith, in 2010, with image of Bristol economist Mary Paley Marshall
- Education: London School of Economics; University of Oxford
- Scientific career
- Thesis: Understanding retirement in the UK : an empirical analysis (2007)

Sarah Louise Smith is a British micro-economist who is a professor at the University of Bristol. She is the Founder and Co-Chair of Discover Economics. Her research has considered a broad range of issues in public and labour economics. She was appointed an Officer of the Order of the British Empire in the 2022 Birthday Honours and was awarded the 2025 Royal Economic Society Medal for Services to the Economics Profession.

== Early life and education ==
Smith studied philosophy, politics and economics at the University of Oxford. After graduating, she worked as an economist at the Institute for Fiscal Studies. She moved to the London School of Economics for a Master's degree in Economics in 1994. Smith eventually completed a doctorate at University College London, where she studied retirement in the United Kingdom. She looked to understand why retirement has been getting earlier since the 1970s, and whether people were retiring voluntarily or involuntarily.

== Research and career ==
Smith worked at HM Treasury in 1999. She was Head of Regulatory Economics at the Financial Services Authority from 2000 to 2003, before joining the London School of Economics as a Lecturer. In 2005 Smith moved to the University of Bristol. Her research has focussed on retirement and the employment of older workers.

Smith has worked to get more women into economics. She has served Chair of the Royal Economic Society Women's Committee. She was elected to the Royal Economic Society Council in 2013, and the European Economic Association in 2014. Smith co-founded Discover Economics, a campaign to diversify who studies economic at A-Level. Smith was awarded an Order of the British Empire in the 2022 Birthday Honours.

In 2025, she was awarded the Royal Economic Society Medal for Services to the Economics Profession.

== Selected publications ==
- Banks, James; Blundell, Richard; Tanner, Sarah (1998). "Is There a Retirement-Savings Puzzle?". The American Economic Review. 88 (4): 769–788. ISSN 0002-8282. JSTOR 117005.
- Sevilla, Almudena; Smith, Sarah (2020-09-28). "Baby steps: the gender division of childcare during the COVID-19 pandemic". Oxford Review of Economic Policy. 36 (Supplement_1): S169–S186. doi:10.1093/oxrep/graa027. ISSN 0266-903X. PMC 7499756.
- Attanasio, Orazio; Banks, James; Sarah Tanner (1998). "Asset Holding and Consumption Volatility" (PDF). National Bureau of Economic Research Working Papers. National Bureau of Economic Research Working Papers (6567). doi:10.3386/w6567. Wikidata Q105852629.
