= Beverley Glover =

British biologist specialising in botany

Beverley Glover FLS FRS
- Born: Beverley Jane Glover; 7 March 1972 (age 54); Ely, Cambridgeshire
- Education: Perth High School; University of St Andrews (BSc); University of East Anglia (PhD)
- Spouse: Stuart Bridge (m. 2003; died 2020)
- Children: Two
- Awards: Bicentenary Medal (2010); William Bate Hardy Prize (2010); Fellow of the Linnean Society of London (2010); Fellow of the Royal Society (2026)
- Scientific career
- Fields: Plant evolution Plant development Plant-pollinator interactions
- Workplaces: John Innes Centre; Queens' College, Cambridge; University of Cambridge; Cambridge University Botanic Garden
- Thesis: Cellular differentiation in plants (1996)
- Doctoral advisor: Cathie Martin
- Website: www.plantsci.cam.ac.uk/directory/glover-beverley

Beverley Jane Glover FLS FRS (born 7 March 1972) is a British biologist specialising in botany. Since July 2013, she has been Professor of Plant Systematics and Evolution in the Department of Plant Sciences at the University of Cambridge and director of the Cambridge University Botanic Garden. She was elected a Fellow of the Royal Society in May 2026.

== Early life and education ==
Glover was born on 7 March 1972 in Ely, Cambridgeshire, England. She is the daughter of Michael Glover and Margaret Glover (née Smith). She was educated at Perth High School, a comprehensive school in Perth, Scotland. She studied plant and environmental biology at the University of St Andrews, graduating with a Bachelor of Science (BSc) degree in 1993. During her undergraduate degree, she spent one summer working at the St Andrews Botanic Garden as a gardener. She then began postgraduate research in plant molecular genetics at the John Innes Centre. In 1997, she completed her Doctor of Philosophy (PhD) degree, awarded by the University of East Anglia. Her doctoral thesis was supervised by Cathie Martin and investigated cellular differentiation in plants.

== Career and research ==
After her PhD, Glover began her career as a junior research fellow at Queens' College, Cambridge between 1996 and 1999. In 1999, she was appointed a lecturer in the Department of Plant Sciences, University of Cambridge. From 2001 to 2007, she was additionally the admissions tutor for science at Queens' College. She was promoted to senior lecturer in 2005 and reader in 2010. In July 2013, she was appointed Director of the Cambridge University Botanic Garden and Professor of plant systematics and evolution.

Glover holds a number of appointments outside her university career. She has been a member of the council of the European society for Evolutionary Developmental Biology since 2010, and of the Systematics Association since 2014. On 1 February 2015, she was appointed a member of the Board of Trustees of the Royal Botanic Garden Edinburgh. The appointment is for four years and will end on 31 January 2019.

Glover serves as a member of the editorial board for Current Biology.

=== Honours and awards ===
In 2010, Glover was awarded the Bicentenary Medal of the Linnean Society. The medal is awarded "in recognition of work done by a biologist under the age of 40 years". In 2010, she was elected a Fellow of the Linnean Society of London (FLS). In January 2011, she was jointly awarded the William Bate Hardy Prize for 2010 by the Cambridge Philosophical Society. In May 2022, she was voted best lecturer by Cambridge University students in the university-wide Student-Led Teaching Awards. In May 2026, Glover was elected to the Fellowship of the Royal Society.

== Personal life ==
In 2003, Glover married Stuart Nigel Bridge (dec Sep 2020). Together they had two children; a daughter and a son.
