= Sally E. Smith =

British-born Australian mycologist (1941–2019)

Sarah Elizabeth Smith (née Harley; 10 May 1941 – 12 September 2019) was a British-born Australian mycologist specialising in mycorrhiza. The Australian Academy of Science described her as "a world authority on the mycorrhizal symbiosis between plants and fungi". She was an adjunct and emeritus professor at the University of Adelaide, in the School of Agriculture, Food and Wine.

== Early life and education ==
Sarah Harley, known as Sally, was born in Oxford, UK, the daughter of Lindsay (née Fitt) and Jack Harley. Both parents were botanists; her father was a fellow of the Royal Society, who was also known for his work on mycorrhiza, and her mother worked for a D.Phil. before the Second World War and collaborated with Jack Harley in cataloguing mycorrhiza.

She gained BA (1962) and PhD degrees (1965) at the University of Cambridge, UK. Her PhD was on mycorrhizal fungi of orchids, supervised by Denis Garrett. She was awarded the DSc degree by the University of Adelaide, Australia, in 1991.

== Research ==
Smith's research was on the evolution and progress of mycorrhizal symbioses, mainly the arbuscular mycorrhizas (Gleomeromycotan fungi). Mycorrhizal symbioses are a symbiotic or mildly pathogenic connection between fungi and the roots of a vascular plant. The investigation involved both simple and strategic analysis, comprehending operations varying from the managing of the symbiosis evolution in mutant plants through features of functions of mycorrhizas in phosphate nutrition of plants and suggestions of the symbiosis for plant competition, crop efficiency and reduction of arsenic toxicity.

== Publications ==
Smith co-authored the textbook Mycorrhizal Symbiosis, first with her father and after his death with David J. Read. It is described by the Australian Academy of Science as "the most definitive text on the subject". First published in 1983, it is now in its third edition.

== Awards and honours ==
Smith was elected fellow of the Australian Academy of Science in 2001. She served on their council in 2005–2008. In 2000, Smith was awarded the Clarke Medal of the Royal Society of New South Wales. In 2006, she was awarded the J.K. Taylor, OBE, Gold Medal in Soil Science. She is an Honorary Professor at the Research Centre for Eco-Environmental Sciences, Chinese Academy of Sciences, Beijing, China, and an Honorary Research Professor at the China Agricultural University, Beijing. She was also the Vice Chair of the Board of Directors of the Asian Vegetable Research & Development Centre—World Vegetable Centre.

== Personal life ==
She married Andrew Smith, also a botanist, and with him immigrated to Adelaide, Australia, in 1967. They had two daughters. She retired in 2010.

Sally Smith died on 12 September 2019.
