= Regius Professor of Botany (Cambridge) =

The chair of the Professor of Botany at the University of Cambridge was founded by the university in 1724. In 2009 the chair was renamed the Regius Professor of Botany.

== Professors of Botany ==
- Richard Bradley (1724)
- John Martyn (1733)
- Thomas Martyn (1762)
- John Stevens Henslow (1825)
- Cardale Babington (1861)
- Harry Marshall Ward (1895)
- Albert Seward (1906)
- Frederick Tom Brooks (1936)
- George Edward Briggs (1948)
- Harry Godwin (1960)
- Percy Wragg Brian (1968)
- Richard Gilbert West (1977)
- Thomas ap Rees (1991)
- Roger Allen Leigh (1998)
- Sir David Baulcombe (2007)

== Regius Professors ==
- Sir David Baulcombe (2009)
- Dame Ottoline Leyser (2020)
