= Charles Chamberlain Hurst =

English geneticist

- Born: 1870
- Died: 1947 (aged 76–77)
- Scientific career
- Fields: Genetics, botany, animal breeding
- Workplaces: Burbage Laboratories, Burbage Nurseries, Burbage, Leics.
- Author abbrev. (botany): Hurst

Charles Chamberlain Hurst (1870–1947) was an English geneticist.

== Career ==
Hurst had hoped to read Natural Sciences at Cambridge University, but became ill at a critical time, possibly with tuberculosis, and this prevented him attending, although he recovered and led an active life thereafter.

Hurst inherited a plant nursery business in the small Leicestershire village of Burbage. At his Burbage laboratories, a part of the family plant nurseries, Hurst carried out his studies on hybridisation in orchids. He wrote an early paper proposing that new species evolved from hybridisation, based on his orchid knowledge, in 1898, almost two decades before similar theories were published by Johannes Paulus Lotsy. Hurst was a frequent correspondent and friend to William Bateson and helped in the introduction of Mendelian genetics in the early 20th century.

Also in Burbage, Hurst collected the first data to advance the theory that blue eye colour was recessive to brown. He carried out many investigations into the genetics of coat colour inheritance in horses, chickens and other domestic animals. As well as studying eye colour in humans, he was an ardent eugenicist and believed fervently that the human race could be improved by genetic study. In his book on 'Creative Evolution' he advocated a theory of musical ability based on Mendelian loci.

Although an early promoter and lifelong supporter of Mendelian genetics and a friend of Bateson's, he appears to have parted ways with his mentor on some points. In his 1932 book on The Mechanism of Creative Evolution Hurst adopted the chromosome theory of inheritance whole-heartedly referring copiously to Thomas Hunt Morgan's Drosophila work, and he was also clearly a staunch Darwinist. He believed that natural selection and Mendelian genetics were compatible, and referred to the theoretical work of Sewall Wright, R.A. Fisher, and J.B.S. Haldane, which proved that quantitative traits and natural selection were compatible with Mendelism. As he argued in Creative Evolution (1932), p. xix:

"The genetical approach to Darwinism has been further strengthened by the mathematical work of Fisher and Haldane, which has placed the study of natural selection on a higher plane, and has provided a new tool and approach to the problem, from which much is expected during the next decade. Fisher's work on The Genetical Theory of Natural Selection, with its new views of the origin of dominance and the natural selection of genotypes, has already become a classic. J.B.S. Haldane's Mathematical Theory of Natural Selection shows that in evolution, neither mutation nor Lamarckian transformation can prevail against natural selection of even moderate intensity. In America, Sewall Wright has also made an extensive mathematical investigation of the problem of evolution and natural selection, and in the main his results agree with those of Fisher and Haldane although he attaches more importance to random survivals in medium-sized populations than either Fisher or Haldane."

Hurst was also a major initiator of the modern "genetical species concept" later known as the biological species concept. This was very much in tune with William Bateson's own beliefs, and Bateson's views on this topic were accepted by many other geneticists worldwide, including Theodosius Dobzhansky. Here is Hurst's concept of species in Creative Evolution (1932), p. 66-7:

"A species is a group of individuals of common descent, with certain constant specific characters in common which are represented in the nucleus of each cell by constant and characteristic sets of chromosomes carrying homozygous specific genes, causing as a rule intra-fertility and inter-sterility. On this view the species is no longer an arbitrary conception convenient to the taxonomist, a mere new name or label, but rather a real specific entity which can be experimentally demonstrated genetically and cytologically. Once the true nature of species is realised and recognised in terms of genes and chromosomes, the way is open to trace its evolution and origin, and the genetical species becomes a measurable and experimental unit of evolution."

Such views were typical of the stance in evolutionary biology, adopted later by and today mainly credited to Theodosius Dobzhansky and Ernst Mayr, and dubbed "The Modern Synthesis" by Julian Huxley in 1942.

=== Significance ===
Hurst was famous for his work on hybridisation and breeding in orchids, but also for carrying out early studies into eye colour genetics (demonstrating the dominance of brown eyes over blue in 1905), and animal coat coloration (in subjects ranging from horses to chickens).

William Bateson was credited as the scientist who first brought Mendel's theories to the English speaking-world, and the coiner of the term 'genetics'. Given the nickname 'Bateson's Bulldog', Hurst has been described along with Bateson as one of the two leaders of Mendelism in England at the turn of the 20th century. Bateson and Hurst collaborated in the battle against the biometricians Karl Pearson and Walter Frank Raphael Weldon, with Hurst generating much data from experimental crosses of different plant varieties and animal colour variants, including chickens, horses, and man. Together they practically proved that Mendelian genetics could be extended to many different systems. Hurst was much younger than Bateson, but had a fiery passion for genetics, great skill in debate, and an approachableness lacking in some of his older peers which meant he was well respected within the scientific and lay community.

== See also ==
- Cock, Alan G. & Forsdyke, D.R. 2008. Treasure Your Exceptions. The Science and Life of William Bateson. Springer-Verlag, Berlin. Chapter 10. Bateson's Bulldog. pp. 269–294.
- Schwartz, J. 2008. In Pursuit of the Gene. From Darwin to DNA. Harvard University Press, Cambridge, Massachusetts. pp. 133–143.

== Some publications ==
- Hurst, C.C. 1898. Curiosities of orchid breeding. Nature (London) 59: 178–181
- Hurst, C.C. & Rolfe R.A. 1909. The Orchid Stud Book
- Hurst, C.C. 1925. Experiments in Genetics
- Hurst, C.C. 1926. Origin of species. Proceedings of the Linnean Society of London 138: 30
- Hurst, C.C. 1927. Species concept. Report of the British Association, 1926, Oxford
- Hurst, C.C. 1927. Mechanism of evolution. Eugenics Review 19: 19
- Hurst, C.C. 1930. Species concept. Gardener's Chronicle 88: 325
- Hurst, C.C. 1931. New species concept. Reports of the International Congress of Botany, 1930. Cambridge
- Hurst, C.C. 1932. The Mechanism of Creative Evolution. Cambridge University Press, Cambridge
- Hurst, C.C. 1932. A Genetic Formula for the Inheritance of Intelligence in Man
- Hurst, C.C. 1934. The Genetics of Intellect
- Hurst, C.C. 1935. Heredity and the Ascent of Man
