= Max Walters =

English botanist and conscientious objector (1920–2005)

Stuart Max Walters
- Born: 23 May 1920; Oughtibridge, Sheffield, Yorkshire, England
- Died: 11 December 2005 (aged 85); Grantchester, Cambridgeshire, England
- Education: Penistone Grammar School; St John's College, Cambridge
- Known for: Botany
- Scientific career
- Institutions: Cambridge University Botanic Garden, Cambridge University Herbarium
- Author abbrev. (botany): Walters

Stuart Max Walters (23 May 1920 – 11 December 2005) was a British botanist and academic.

Walters was educated at Penistone Grammar School and St John's College, Cambridge, where he took a first-class degree in natural sciences. As a conscientious objector in the Second World War, he worked as a hospital orderly in Sheffield and Bristol. He was Curator of the Herbarium, Botany School, University of Cambridge 1949–73, Lecturer in Botany 1962–73, and for the ten years up until his retirement, 1973–83, Director of the University Botanic Garden in Cambridge, of which he wrote a history. He was a Research Fellow at St John's (1948-51) and Fellow of King's College, Cambridge (1964–84).

He was the author of numerous books on plants and flowers, most notably the 1964 Atlas of the British Flora (with Franklyn Perring) and as a co-editor of Flora Europaea. He wrote two well-known books for the New Naturalist library, Wild Flowers (1954, co-written with John Gilmour) and Mountain Flowers (1956, with John Raven). He was much involved in the research and management of Wicken Fen. After his retirement, he wrote a biography of Darwin's teacher and friend, John Stevens Henslow, Darwin's mentor (2001).

Walters was a committed Christian who was much involved both in the local life of the Church of England (he was a churchwarden at Grantchester for many years) and in the application of Christian principles to national and social life: he was a Christian socialist and also a Christian pacifist, and as such was a leading member of the Fellowship of Reconciliation and also active in the Campaign for Nuclear Disarmament.

== Bibliography ==
- Walters, S.M. (1981). The shaping of Cambridge botany : a short history of whole-plant botany in Cambridge from the time of Ray into the present century. Cambridge University Press. ISBN 9780521237956.
- Lacey, Pippa. "Changing Perspectives: a Garden through time". Cambridge University Botanic Garden.
- Obituary in the 2006 Annual Report of King's College Cambridge
- Cullen, James (17 February 2006). "Max Walters, an Appreciation". Curtis's Botanical Magazine. 23 (1): 2–3. doi:10.1111/j.1355-4905.2006.00520.x.
