= Franklyn Perring =

British naturalist

Franklyn Perring OBE
- Born: 1 August 1927; Forest Gate, East London, United Kingdom
- Died: 11 October 2003 (aged 76)
- Occupation: naturalist

Franklyn Hugh Perring (1 August 1927 – 11 October 2003) was a British naturalist, regarded as "one of the most influential botanists and nature conservationists of the 20th century".

Perring authored or co-edited over a dozen floras, conservation articles and wild flower guides, but is best known as joint editor of the Atlas of the British Flora. This was a landmark publication, produced for the Botanical Society of the British Isles (BSBI) in 1962, and which laid the groundwork for future national and local biological recording schemes across Britain.

Perring was head of the national Biological Records Centre based at Monks Wood from 1964 to 1978.

In the late 1970s he was instrumental in initiating the move towards the creation of smaller, more regional biological records centres across the UK. He also played a key role in the development of the modern Wildlife Trust movement.

== Early life ==
Franklyn Perring was born in Forest Gate, East London and was the son of an antiques dealer. He grew up at Woodford Green, close to the Epping Forest, and also spent time at weekends on the Blackwater estuary. Encouraged by his uncle Stanley Perring, a biologist and teacher, it was there that he developed his interest in natural history which was to shape the course of the rest of his life.

At the outbreak of the Second World War, Perring was sent to boarding school at Earls Colne Grammar School in Essex. There, his biology master, CJ Sims, encouraged his interests. Following national service in the army, which he spent in Ireland, Malaya and India, Perring enrolled for a degree in natural sciences at Queens' College, Cambridge. He remained there to study for a PhD on the ecology and biogeography of plants of chalk grassland. It was at Cambridge that he developed a lifelong friendship with his supervisor, the biologist Max Walters, who was then curator of the university herbarium.

== Atlas of the British Flora ==
In October 1954, Perring was given the job of assisting Max Walters who, himself, had been appointed by the BSBI to coordinate an ambitious five-year scheme to map the incidence of all vascular plant species across the British Isles; a project covering some 3,500 map squares, each measuring 10 km by 10 km. Perring designed different recording cards for each region of the country, and led field-recording trips to ensure the under-recorded parts of Britain were covered, sometimes travelling by train and bicycle to reach the remotest parts, and personally assisted Professor D. A. Webb with his efforts to cover the Republic of Ireland. Perring also managed the inputting of data onto punched cards, and coordinated the then quite innovative application of a tabulator to print maps mechanically from punched cards. Perring subsequently became the director of the BSBI recording scheme in 1959.

The 1962 Atlas of the British Flora by Perring and Walters has been described as "One of the most important British natural history publications of the last century". By visually mapping the distribution of a species, Perring and Walters' publication heralded a new era in natural history recording and publication in both the British Isles and across northern Europe. In course of time, this approach of species-mapping become almost universal at both the local and the national level.

Perring subsequently collaborated with Peter D. Sell on a Critical Supplement to the Atlas of the British Flora, which was a separate publication, mapping the more difficult plants to identify, such as the hawkweeds, whitebeams and mints.

== Biological Records Centre, Monks Wood ==
In 1964, Perring moved to the recently established Nature Conservancy Experimental Station at Monks Wood near Huntingdon, whose role included studying the effects of pollution on wildlife. At Monks Wood he founded the Biological Records Centre (BRC), becoming its first head; the BRC continued the data collation work begun with the 1962 Atlas. Perring worked with other naturalists there to extend the recording methodology into non-botanical fields. Further distribution atlases were soon published, covering mammals, butterflies and moths, amongst others.

In addition to launching and promoting many other species recording schemes, Perring was jointly responsible for compiling another innovative work. Published in 1977, the first British red data book listed all the threatened species of vascular plants in the country.

== Royal Society for Nature Conservation ==
In 1979, Perring left the Biological Records Centre at Monks Wood to take up the post of general secretary of the Royal Society for Nature Conservation (RSNC), a national body acting as a coordinating organisation for the country's fifty local naturalists' trusts (later Wildlife Trusts). He remained in this position until he retired in 1987. During his tenure, the RSNC raised £15m for wildlife projects, launched Natural World magazine for all Trust members, established some 500 nature reserves and founded many urban wildlife groups.

Perring was also a founder member of the Cambridgeshire Wildlife Trust.

== Contribution to botany ==
Perring was president of the Botanical Society of the British Isles from 1993 to 1995 - an organisation to which he is regarded as having made his greatest contribution.

Perring was an earlier protagonist for the establishment of Local Biological Records Centres, and in the late 1970s led a conference which effectively kick-started the movement within local museums.

He helped to establish the European mapping project, based in Helsinki, and which is still working on compiling the 'Atlas Florae Europaeae' - mapping all the species listed in Flora Europaea.

Perring was an active Fellow of the Linnean Society of London for 39 years and was its Botanical Secretary between 1973 and 1978. He took a great interest in encouraging the next generations of botanists, and working closely with the University of Birmingham to support this.

== Honours and recognition ==
Franklyn Perring was awarded an OBE in 1988.

The University of Leicester recognised Perring's botanical contributions, and especially his work with the Botanical Society of the British Isles, by awarding him an Honorary DSc in 1989.

== Later life ==
Following his retirement in 1987, Perring developed many interests. He lived on the edge of Oundle and was secretary to the nearby church council of St Rumbald's, Stoke Doyle, where he successfully influenced the churchyard's management regime so that became a flower-rich meadow.

After retiring Perring and a colleague, Anne Cryer, established an eco-tourism company, Wildlife Travel, which arranged escorted wildlife tours to Europe and beyond. All profits from the company were returned to the Wildlife Trusts. Perring escorted his final tour in the year he died.

Franklyn Perring died of cancer, aged 76. He was survived by his wife Margaret and daughter Emma, as well as by Neil, a son from a previous marriage to the late Yvonne Matthews.

== Selected publications ==
Among the books of which he was co-author are:

- Atlas of the British Flora (1962) Perring, F, Walters, M; Botanical Society of the British Isles.
- A Flora of Cambridgeshire (1964) Perring, F, Walters, M, Sell, PD, Whitehouse, H.L.K.
- Critical Supplement to the Atlas of the British Flora (1968); Perring, F; Botanical Society of the British Isles.
- English Names of Wild Flowers (1974) Dony, J G; Rob, C M; Perring, FH Butterworths, London.
- Vascular Plants (British Red Data Books: 1) (1977) Perring, FH & Farrell, L.; The Society for the Promotion of Nature Conservation; ISBN 978-0902484023
- A Handbook for Local Biological Record Centres (1978) Flood, SW & Perring, FH, Huntindon, Institute of Terrestrial Ecology.
- RSNC Guide to Wild Flowers (1984), Perring, F Publisher: Hamlyn ISBN 9780600356172
- The Ecological Flora of the Shropshire Region (1985). Sinker, CA, Packham, JR, Trueman, IC, Oswald, PF, Perring, FH & Prestwood, WV; Shropshire Trust for Nature Conservation,
- The Macmillan Guide to British Wildflowers (1989) Perring, F, Walters, M; Macmillan; ISBN 978-0333445228

Perring was editor of The Flora of a Changing Britain (1974) and co-edited many other publications, including:

- Ecological Effects of Pesticides (1977)
- Changing Attitudes to Nature Conservation (1988)
- Tomorrow is Too Late (1990)
- Britain's Conservation Heritage (1991).

The standard author abbreviation F.H.Perring is used to indicate this person as the author when citing a botanical name.
