= Biological Records Centre =

UK organization

- Abbreviation: BRC
- Formation: 1964; 62 years ago
- Legal status: Unit within the Centre for Ecology and Hydrology
- Location: Maclean Building, Crowmarsh Gifford, Oxfordshire, OX10 8BB
- Region served: United Kingdom
- Head: Dr David Roy
- Affiliations: Centre for Ecology and Hydrology
- Website: www.brc.ac.uk

The Biological Records Centre (BRC) established in 1964, is a national focus in the UK for terrestrial and fresh water species recording.

The term "biological records centre" is also used in the context of local centres, now frequently referred to as "local environmental records centres" (LERCs).

== History ==
The Biological Records Centre (BRC) was set up in 1964 by the Nature Conservancy (UK) at its recently opened Monks Wood Experimental Station near Huntingdon. BRC developed from the Atlas of the British Flora project of the Botanical Society of the British Isles (BSBI) to map the distribution of British (and Irish) flowering plants, which had established basic principles for biological recording in the UK. The former BSBI project leader, Franklyn Perring, established BRC with the project's original data and data processing equipment.

== Function ==
As part of the UK Centre for Ecology & Hydrology (UKCEH), BRC provides a focus for the collation, management, dissemination and interpretation of species observations (biological records). BRC is now based at UKCEH's Wallingford site, near Oxford. Most records are collected by volunteer recording schemes and societies, which are integral to the work of BRC. These activities are supported through a long-term funding partnership between the Natural Environment Research Council (NERC), which is now part of UK Research and Innovation (UKRI) and the Joint Nature Conservation Committee (JNCC).

== Activities ==
Together with more than 80 recording schemes and societies, BRC supports biological recording for a wide range of plant and animal groups. BRC helps the recording community to publish atlases, datasets and other online resources, providing information for research, policy and the conservation of wildlife. Through the use of technology BRC helps to harness the enthusiasm and knowledge of naturalists and to enable them to collate and analyse their records. To celebrate the BRC's 50th Anniversary, a special issue of the Biological Journal of the Linnean Society was published with 23 research and review articles covering the centre's work.

In addition to its work with recording schemes and societies, BRC has played a key role in the greater integration of biological recording activities in the UK, most recently through the National Biodiversity Network (NBN). BRC helped to found the National Federation for Biological Recording (NFBR) in 1986 and carried out much of the survey and analysis for the report of the Coordinating Commission for Biological Recording (CCBR) published in 1995, both of which helped shape the future of biological recording in the UK.

== Local biological records centres ==
A network of local biological records centres or local environmental records centres (usually abbreviated to BRC, LRC or LERC,) covers most areas of the UK. All local centres are entirely independent of the Biological Records Centre. The first such local centre was the Natural History Record Bureau at what is now Tullie House Museum in Carlisle which opened in 1902. As with many LERCs it grew out of the biological recording work of the local natural history society. LERCs have a complementary role to BRC and recording schemes as systems "for collating biological data from a wide range of sources (including organisations and individuals), for ensuring that data are properly validated and catalogued, and for providing access to them, thereby acting as a focus for biological information." Local Environmental Records Centres are non-profit, partnership-led organisations and typically organised on a county or multi-county basis. Increasingly they are becoming better networked through the activities of the Association of Local Environmental Records Centres, the National Biodiversity Network, Natural England, The Wildlife Trusts partnership and NFBR, which became the National Forum for Biological Recording in 2013. rECOrd is an example of a Local Environmental Records Centre.

== See also ==
- Atlases of the flora and fauna of Britain and Ireland
- Biological recording
- Centre for Ecology and Hydrology
