= RECOrd (Local Biological Records Centre) =

Local biological records center serving Chesire, UK

rECOrd is a Local Biological Records Centre (LRC) serving Cheshire, Halton, Warrington and Wirral (including the vice-county 'pan-handle' boundary around Stockport) - 'The Cheshire region'. It provides a local facility for the storage, validation and usage of Cheshire-based biological data under the National Biodiversity Network (NBN) project. It is one of a number of local Biological Records Centres across Britain which together aim to give complete geographic coverage of the UK.

The organisation is housed in Oakfield House at Chester Zoo. It provides support for biological recording and for biological recorders within the Cheshire region, allowing as wide access as is possible to both species and habitat records for the region commensurate with protecting those self-same species and habitats. This access aims to inform, educate and to provide real data upon which environmentalists, ecologists, planners, and other individuals and organisations can base decisions.

rECOrd deals with data for wildlife, biodiversity, nature, habitats, wildlife sites and geology, geomorphology and geodiversity.

rECOrd Online Data Input System (RODIS) is a facility for entering wildlife sighting information via the rECOrd website.

A mix of permanent staff, contractors and volunteers undertake data keying and verification duties, surveys and research historical data.

rECOrd is a non-profit making (not-for-profit) company, limited by guarantee (Company No.: 4046886), and is also a charity (Reg. No.: 1095859). David Bellamy is the organisation's patron, and Gordon McGregor Reid is its president.

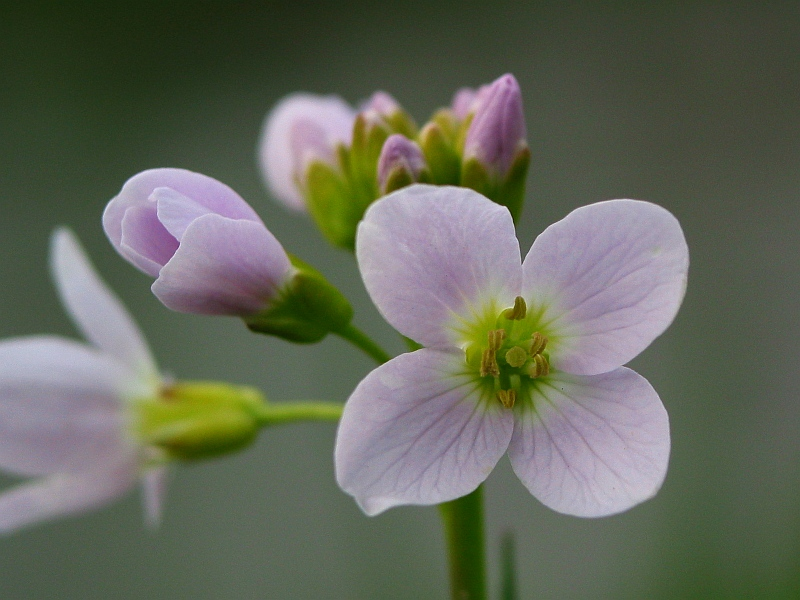
Cardamine pratensis (Cuckoo Flower or Lady's Smock), a flowering plant of the family Brassicaceae, is the county flower of Cheshire (Plantlife competition).

== Geographic area ==
The area covered is designated as 'the Cheshire region'.

- the county of Cheshire (both modern and vice-county)
- the administrative and unitary authorities of Halton and Warrington
- the Wirral (once part of Cheshire - now part of Merseyside)
- the Mersey and Dee river estuaries and
- the marine environment bordering the Wirral out to the 12 mile limit

== History ==
rECOrd began its development in October 2000, managed by Steve J. McWilliam, and was fully launched on 12 July 2002 when it was formally opened by Sir Martin Doughty of English Nature.
