= Atlases of the flora and fauna of Great Britain and Ireland =

The biodiversity of Great Britain and Ireland is one of the most well-studied geographical areas of its size in the world. This biota work has resulted in the publication of distribution atlases for many taxonomic groups. This page lists these publications.

A full atlas is generally regarded as a definitive work on distribution, whereas a provisional atlas is typically produced as an interim stage to show survey progress.

One of the bodies responsible for publishing a great number of distribution atlases is the Institute of Terrestrial Ecology. Each atlas presents 10 km^{2} distribution maps for the species within its scope. Maps typically use different symbols to signify records from differing time-periods - solid symbols for 10-km squares (hectads) that have recent records, and unfilled symbols for 10-km squares for which only older records exist, according to a defined cut-off date.

The atlases are produced by the Biological Records Centre (BRC), which is run by the Institute of Terrestrial Ecology, part of the Centre for Ecology and Hydrology based at CEH Wallingford, Crowmarsh Gifford, Oxfordshire. The data used to produce the maps is gathered by volunteer biological recorders and collated by the BRC Recording Schemes.

The atlases fall into two groups:

- Main Atlases are commercially published books, presenting the current state of knowledge for well-recorded groups. They typically include text information about the species, and other supporting material such as analyses of trends. They are usually produced only where a well-established recording scheme has been in operation for a significant period of time, and the scheme organisers believe that the data represent a comprehensive picture of the distribution of each species.
- Provisional Atlases give recorders an indication of progress and illustrate early results. Some of the later ones are quite detailed and less "provisional" - for example the Hoverfly Atlas, which provides charts of flight-period as well as text, and the Atlas of Aquatic Bugs, which has biological information and identification aids for some of the animals.

== Flora ==
Taxonomic group
Publication details
Body responsible for survey co-ordination
Full or provisional
Date range for survey data
Algae
- Norton, T.A. 1985 Provisional atlas of the marine algae of Britain and Ireland
ITE

Mosses and Liverworts

Fungi

Slime-moulds
- Ing, B. 1982 Provisional atlas of the myxomycetes of the British Isles
ITE

Pteridophytes (Ferns and allies)
- Preston C. D., Pearman D. A. and Dines T.D. (2002) New Atlas of the British & Irish Flora, Oxford University Press (ISBN 0-19-851067-5)
BSBI
Full
TBC
Flowering plants and conifers
- Preston C. D., Pearman D. A. and Dines T.D. (2002) New Atlas of the British & Irish Flora, Oxford University Press (ISBN 0-19-851067-5)
BSBI
Full
TBC

== Fauna ==
Taxonomic group
Taxonomic sub-group
Publication details
Body responsible for survey co-ordination
Full or provisional
Date range for survey data
Amphibians

See Herpetofauna below
Birds

Sharrock, J. T. R. (John Timothy Robin) (1976). The atlas of breeding birds in Britain and Ireland. Tring: British Trust for Ornithology. pp. 477p : ill., maps, 27 cm. ISBN 0-903793-01-6.
BTO
Full
TBC

Lack, Peter (1986). The Atlas of wintering birds in Britain and Ireland. Calton, Staffordshire: Published by T. & A.D. Poyser [for] British Trust for Ornithology, Irish Wildbird Conservancy. pp. 447 p. : ill., 27 cm. ISBN 0-85661-043-7.
BTO
Full
TBC

Wernham, Chris (2002). The migration atlas movements of birds of Britain and Ireland. London: T. & A. D. Poyser. pp. 884 p. ISBN 0-7136-6514-9.
BTO
Full
TBC
Centipedes

- Barber, A.D. & A.N. New 1988 Provisional Atlas of the Centipedes of the British Isles
ITE

Herpetofauna

- Arnold, H. R. (1995) Atlas of amphibians and reptiles in Britain HMSO (ISBN 0-11-701824-4)
ITE
Full
TBC
Annelids
Leechs
- Elliott, J.M. & Tullett, P.A. 1982. Provisional atlas of the freshwater leeches of the British Isles.
ITE

Arachnida
Harvest-spiders
- Sankey, J.H.P. 1988 Provisional atlas of the harvest-spiders (Arachnida: Opiliones) of the British Isles
ITE

Spiders
- Harvey, P.R., Nellist, D.R. & Telfer, M.G. (editors) 2002. Provisional atlas of British spiders (Arachnida, Araneae) 2 vols.
ITE

Insects
Beetles
- Alexander, Keith N. A. 2003 Provisional atlas of the Cantharoidea and Buprestoidea (Coleoptera) of Britain and Ireland
- Johnson, C. 1993. Provisional atlas of the Cryptophagidae - Atomariinae (Coleoptera) of Britain and Ireland
- Luff, Martin L. 1998 Provisional Atlas of the Ground Beetles (Coleoptera, Carabidae) of Britain
- Mendel, H. 1990. Provisional atlas of the click beetles (Coleoptera: Elateroidea) of the British Isles
- Twinn, P.F.G and P.T. Harding 1999 Provisional Atlas of the longhorn beetles of Britain
- Cox M., Atlas of the Seed and Leaf Beetles of Britain and Ireland (Bruchids and Chrysomelids) - (ISBN 978-1-874357-35-3)
ITE

Bugs
- Huxley, T. 2003. Provisional atlas of the British aquatic bugs (Hemiptera, Heteroptera).
ITE

Butterflies
- Fox, R., Asher, J., Brereton, T., Roy, D. and Warren, M (2006) The State of Butterflies in Britain and Ireland , Pisces Publications (ISBN 1-874357-31-5)
- Bland, K.P. 1986 Preliminary atlas of the Lepidoptera: Incurvarioidea of the British Isles
Butterfly Conservation

ITE

Full
2000–2004

Caddissflies
- Marshall, J.E. 1978 Provisional atlas of the insects of the British Isles: Part 8, Trichoptera: Hydroptilidae, caddisflies
ITE

Dragonflies & damselflies
- Merritt, R., N. W. Moore and B. C. Eversham (1996) Atlas of the dragonflies of Britain and Ireland, HMSO (ISBN 0-11-701561-X)
Institute of Terrestrial Ecology
Full
TBC

Earwigs
See Grasshoppers, crickets & allies below

Fleas
- George, R.S. 1974. Provisional atlas of the insects of the British Isles: Part 4, Siphonaptera, fleas.
ITE

True flies
- Stubbs, Alan E. Provisional Atlas of the long-palped craneflies (Diptera, Tipulinae) of Britain and Ireland
- Ball, S.G. & McLean, I.F.G. 1986 A preliminary atlas of the Sciomyzidae of Great Britain
- Ball, S.G. & Morris, R.K.A. 2000 Provisional atlas of British hoverflies (Diptera, Syrphidae).
- Drake, C.M. 1991 Provisional atlas of the Larger Brachycera (Diptera) of Britain and Ireland
- Goldie-Smith, E.K. 1990 Distribution maps for Dixidae in Great Britain and Ireland
- Pont, A. 1986 Provisional atlas of the Sepsidae (Diptera) of the British Isles.
- Stubbs, A.E. 1993 Provisional atlas of the ptychopterid craneflies (Diptera: Ptychopteridae) of Britain and Ireland
ITE

Grasshoppers, crickets & allies
- Haes, E. C. M. and P. T. Harding (1997) Atlas of grasshoppers, crickets and allied insects in Britain and Ireland, HMSO (ISBN 0-11-702117-2)
ITE
Full
TBC

Hymenoptera
- Archer, M.E. 1979 Provisional atlas of the insects of the British Isles: Part 9, Hymenoptera: Vespidae, social wasps.
- Anon. 1980 Atlas of the bumblebees of the British Isles
- Barrett, K.E.J. 1979 Provisional atlas of the insects of the British Isles: Part 5, Hymenoptera: Formicidae, ants
- Edwards, Robin (Ed.) 1997-2001 Provisional Atlas of the aculeate Hymenoptera of Britain and Ireland Parts 1–4
ITE

Lacewings and allies,
- Plant, Colin W. 1999 Provisional Atlas of the lacewings and allied insects (Neuroptera, Megaloptera, Rhaphidioptera and Mecoptera) of Britain and Ireland
ITE

Mammals

- Arnold, H. R. (1993) Atlas of mammals in Britain HMSO (ISBN 0-11-701667-5)
ITE
Full
TBC
Millipedes

- British Myriapod Group, 1988. Preliminary atlas of the millipedes of the British Isles
ITE

Nematodes

- Brown, D.J.F., Taylor, C.E., Boag, B., Alphey, T.J.W. & Orton-Williams, K.J. 1977. Provisional atlas of the nematodes of the British Isles: Part 1-3, Longidoridae, Trichodoridae and Criconematidae
ITE

Reptiles

See Herpetofauna above
Ticks

- Martyn, K. P. Martyn, K. P. 1998 Provisional Atlas of the ticks (Ixoidea) of British Isles
ITE
