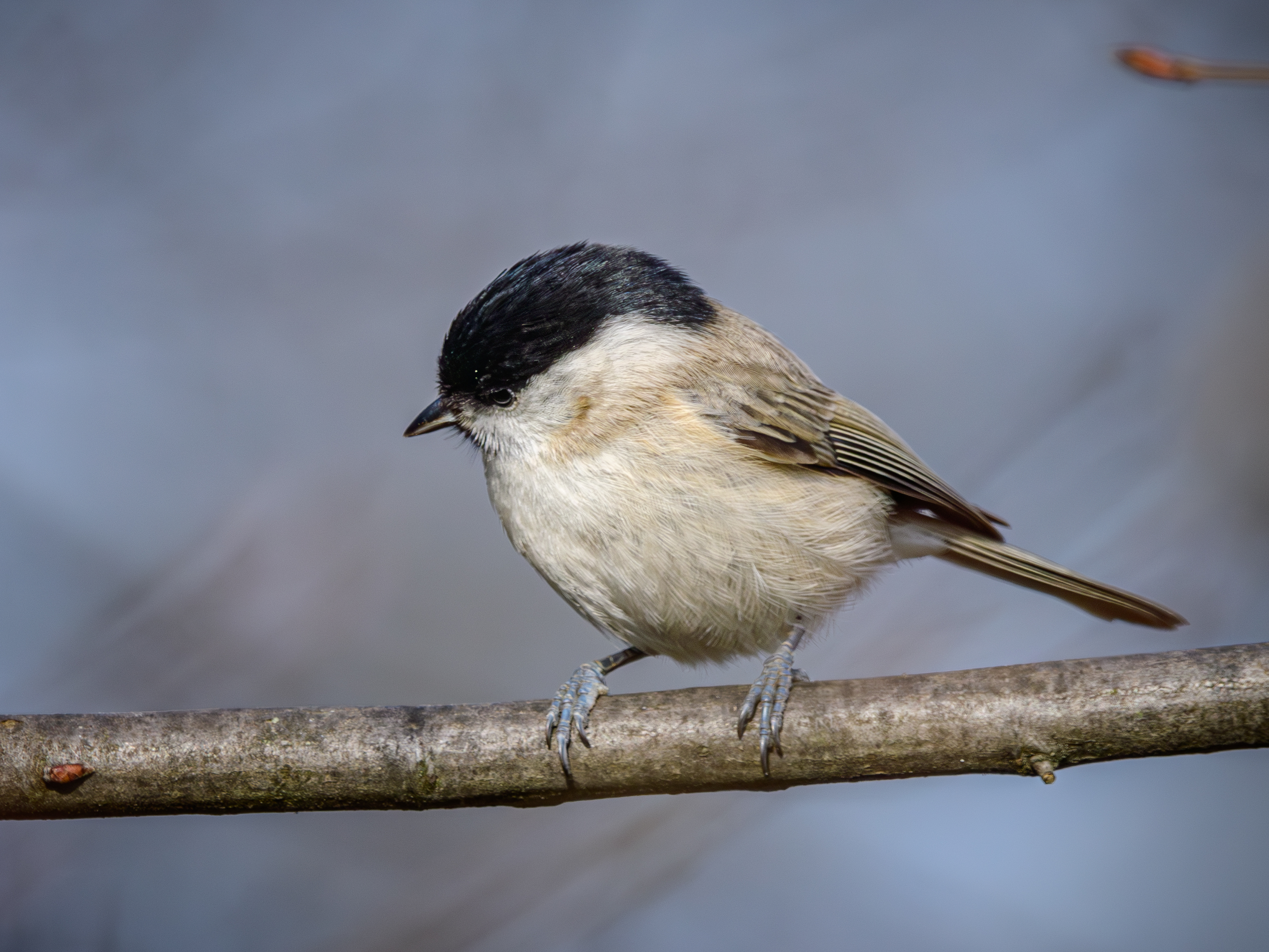
- Poecile palustris palustris, near Mannheim, Germany

Conservation status
- Least Concern (IUCN 3.1)

Scientific classification
- Kingdom: Animalia
- Phylum: Chordata
- Class: Aves
- Order: Passeriformes
- Family: Paridae
- Genus: Poecile
- Species: P. palustris

Binomial name
- Poecile palustris (Linnaeus, 1758)
- Range of Poecile palustris Resident

Synonyms
- Parus palustris Linnaeus, 1758

Audio
- Song recorded in Russia

= Marsh tit =

Species of bird

The marsh tit (Poecile palustris) is a Eurasian passerine bird in the tit family Paridae and genus Poecile, closely related to the willow tit, Père David's and Songar tits. It is a small bird, around 12 cm (4.7 in) long and weighing 12 g (0.42 oz), with a black crown and nape, pale cheeks, brown back and greyish-brown wings and tail. Between 8 and 11 subspecies are recognised. Its close resemblance to the willow tit can cause identification problems, especially in the United Kingdom where the local subspecies of the two are very similar; they were not recognised as separate species until 1897.

Globally, the marsh tit is classified as Least Concern, although there is evidence of a decline in numbers (in the UK, numbers have dropped by more than 50% since the 1970s, for example). It can be found throughout temperate Europe and northern Asia and, despite its name, it occurs in a range of habitats including dry woodland. The marsh tit is omnivorous; its food includes caterpillars, spiders and seeds. It nests in tree holes, choosing existing hollows to enlarge, rather than excavating its own. A clutch of 5–9 eggs is laid.

== Taxonomy and systematics ==
The marsh tit was formally described by the Swedish naturalist Carl Linnaeus in 1758 in the tenth edition of his Systema Naturae under the binomial name Parus palustris. It is now placed in the genus Poecile that was described by the German naturalist Johann Jakob Kaup in 1829. The genus name as cited by Kaup is from Greek ποιχίλος, with his interpretation as 'bunt' ("coloured") in German; another suggestion is that it is from the Ancient Greek name for a now unidentifiable small bird, and is perhaps derived from poikolos, meaning "spotted". The specific palustris is Latin for "marshy".

An analysis of mitochondrial DNA sequences has shown that the marsh tit belongs to a group of Eurasian Poecile tits that include the willow tit, Père David's tit, the black-bibbed tit, and the Songar tit.

Ten subspecies are currently recognised:

- P. p. dresseri (Stejneger, 1886) – central and southern England, Wales, and west France. Still present in the far southeast of Scotland but in very small numbers. Slightly smaller than P. p. palustris and more brown or olive-coloured on upperparts and dirtier below. Pale brown tertial fringes can sometimes cause confusion with willow tit
- P. p. palustris (Linnaeus, 1758) – north and central Europe, from south Scandinavia south to north Iberia, east to central Poland, west Balkans and Greece
- P. p. italicus (Tschusi & Hellmayr, 1900) – French Alps, Italy and Sicily. As P. p. dresseri, but more rufous on upperparts and paler on underparts In Sicily, the subspecies P. p. siculus (De Burg, 1925) was described; this was considered synonymous with P. p. italicus by Vaurie (1959), and subsequently forgotten by most authors. However, in a typical cline pale-dark/north-south all over Europe, and along the Italian peninsula too, where darkest birds are in the Alpine area and palest (as pale as the nominate subspecies) in Calabria, the Sicilian very isolated and relict population is composed by the smallest and darkest birds in Europe, therefore rather out of the clinal gradient/intergrade populations. It deserves better in depth study before being synonymised (Priolo, 1969; Corso, 2005)
- P. p. stagnatilis (Brehm, CL, 1855) – east Europe east to south Urals and northwest Turkey
- P. p. kabardensis (Buturlin, 1929) – Caucasus and northeast Turkey
- P. p. brevirostris Taczanowski, 1872 – south central & southeast Siberia, north Mongolia, northeast China and North Korea
- P. p. ernsti (Yamashina, 1933) – Sakhalin Island
- P. p. hensoni (Stejneger, 1892) – south Kuril Islands and Hokkaido, Japan
- P. p. jeholicus (Kleinschmidt, O & Weigold, 1922) – northeast China and North Korea
- P. p. hellmayri Bianchi, 1903 – east China and South Korea

== Description ==
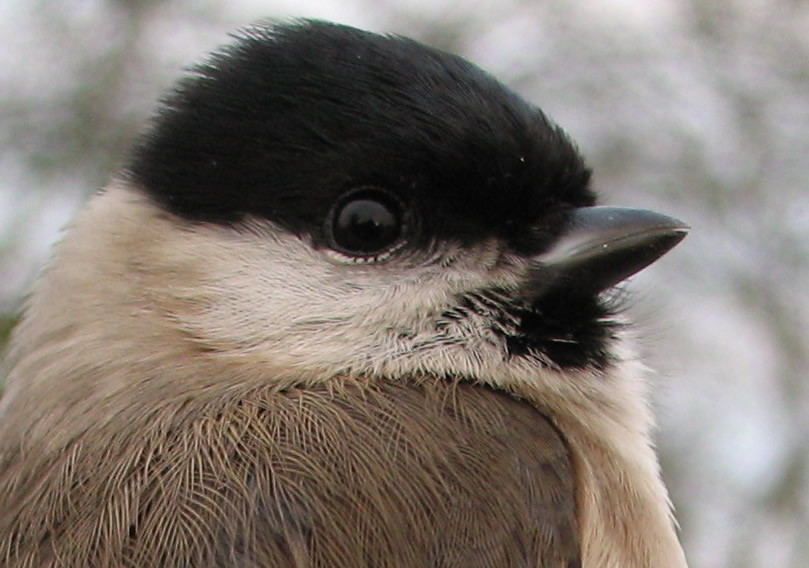
Bird trapped for ringing showing pale 'cutting edges' to bill

The nominate subspecies has a black cap and nape with a blue sheen visible at close quarters. The black 'bib' below the bill is rather small; the cheeks are white, turning dusky brown on the ear coverts. The upperparts, tail and wings are greyish-brown, with slightly paler fringes to the tertials. The underparts are off-white with a buff or brown tinge strongest on the flanks and undertail coverts. The bill is black and the legs dark grey. Juveniles are very similar to adults, but with a duller black cap and bib, more greyish upperparts and paler underparts; they moult into adult plumage by September.

The marsh tit weighs 12 g (0.42 oz), has a length of 11.5 to 12 cm (4.5 to 4.7 in) (from bill to tail) and a wingspan of 19 cm (7.5 in). The wing length ranges from 60–70 mm (2.4–2.8 in). The oldest recorded marsh tit in Europe reached the age of 11 years, 11 months.

Like other tits it has a large range of call notes; most typical is the explosive "pitchou" note, given when agitated, often leading into "pitchou-bee-bee-bee", which can sound like willow tit when not heard clearly. Unlike many other tits, however, the marsh tit has a well-defined song and a wide song repertoire. Individual birds can have more than five songs, which they use interchangeably. Some of the more common songs include a typical tit-like, ringing, "schip-schip-schip-schip-ship", a more liquid "tu-tu-tu-tu-tu" and sometimes a sweet "tyeu-tyeu-tyeu-tyeu-tyeu". The old Staffordshire name for the species, 'Saw Whetter', refers to the bird's scolding call.

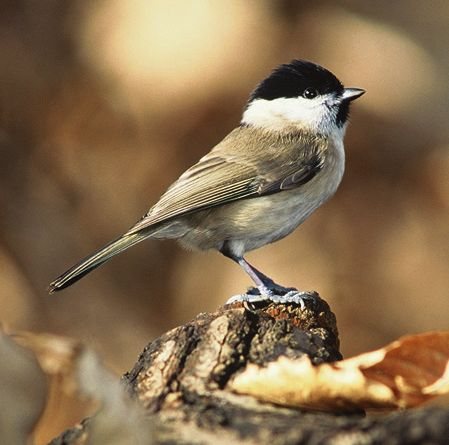
Note the glossy cap, smaller bib and uniform wings which help distinguish it from the willow tit.

Marsh and willow tits are difficult to distinguish on appearance alone; the subspecies occurring in the UK (P. p. dresseri and P. m. kleinschmidti respectively) are especially hard to separate. In good photographs, or when caught for ringing, the pale 'cutting edge' of the marsh tit's bill is a reliable criterion; otherwise, the best way to tell apart the two species is by voice. Other plumage characteristics include the lack of a pale wing panel (formed by pale edges to the secondary feathers in the willow tit), the marsh tit's glossier black cap and smaller black 'bib', although none of these is 'completely reliable'; for example, juvenile marsh tits can show a pale wing panel. The marsh tit has a noticeably smaller and shorter head than the willow tit and overall the markings are crisp and neat, with the head in proportion to the rest of the bird (willow tit gives the impression of being 'bull-necked').

A measure of the difficulty in identification is given by the fact that, in the UK, the willow tit was not identified as distinct from marsh tit until 1897. Two German ornithologists, Ernst Hartert and Otto Kleinschmidt, were studying marsh tit skins at the British Museum and found two wrongly-labelled willow tits amongst them (the two willow tit specimens had been collected at Coalfall Wood in Finchley, north London; and that species was added to the British list in 1900).

== Distribution and habitat ==
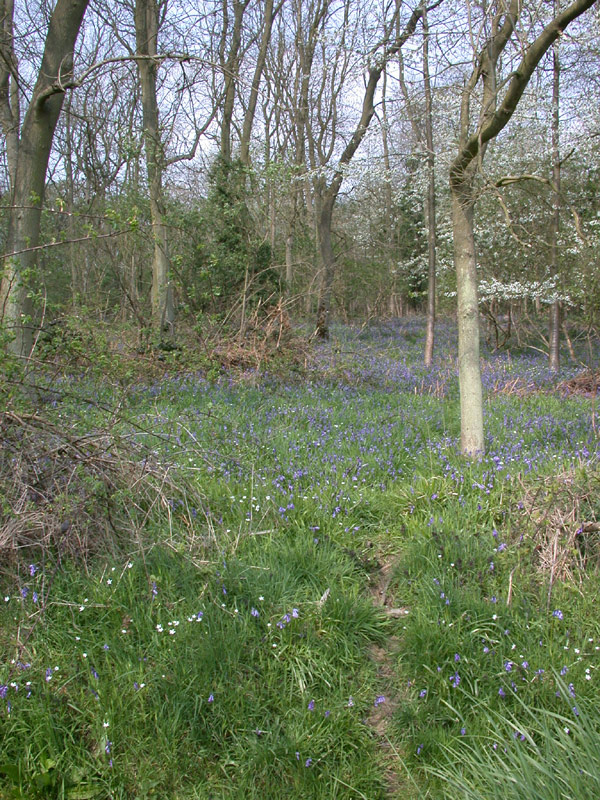
Typical marsh tit habitat in Northamptonshire, England.

The marsh tit has a worldwide Extent of Occurrence of around 10 million square kilometres. The global population includes between 6.1 million and 12 million birds in Europe alone. The species is classified as Least Concern, though there is some evidence of a decline in numbers. For example, between the 1970s and 2007, marsh tit numbers declined in the United Kingdom by more than 50% and consequently it is on the Red List of species compiled by the UK's Joint Nature Conservation Committee. Research suggests that the cause may be low survival rates from year to year, though the nest failure rate has fallen during the decline. Other studies have shown that reduced diversity of woodland structure and plant species, partly because of the impact of deer browsing, is the cause of the bird's decline.

Data from 157 woodlands covered by the RSPB/BTO Repeat Woodland Bird Survey showed that the abundance of marsh tits in 2003–2004 corresponded with the vegetation present 2–4 metres above the ground, the shrub layer. Data from the 1980s did not show the same results, but marsh tit numbers had increased by 2003–2004 in woods with the most shrub cover. The study concluded that damage to the shrub layer, caused by overgrazing by deer, for example, may make woodland less suitable for marsh tits.

It is a widespread and common resident breeder throughout temperate Europe and northern Asia. It occurs from northern Spain north to south-eastern Scotland and east to western Russia, with a broad gap in western Asia and present again in eastern Asia from the Altai Mountains east to northern Japan and northern and western China.

This species is sedentary, making short post-breeding movements in most of its range, but in northern Europe some move southward in winter. However, marsh tits seem not to perform the occasional irruptions that other members of the tit family do. Most marsh tits stay in their breeding territories year-round; presumably this is related to their food-storing strategy. Analysis of UK ringing data showed that of 108 recoveries (when a ringed bird is found dead or caught by another ringer), 85% were less than 5 km from where the bird was originally caught, and only 1% further than 20 km. Young birds join mixed roaming flocks; adults also join the flocks when they pass through, but do not stray from their territory.

Marsh tits breed mostly in lowland areas, but can reach altitudes of up to 1,300 m. They prefer large areas of moist, broadleaved woodland, often oak or beech, though they can occupy wet alder woodland, riverside trees, parks and gardens or orchards. A study at Monks Wood, Cambridgeshire, England, found that marsh tits required mature trees with a shrub layer below the canopy, but that they avoided parts of the wood with many young trees. Another study in the United Kingdom found that during winter and while foraging, marsh tits spent more time than blue tits in the wood's understorey, and more time lower in the woodland canopy and understorey. Trees and shrubs in 10 breeding territories were also compared. The trees varied significantly between territories, but the shrub characteristics did not, suggesting that the shrubs were more important to the birds. In Wytham Woods, Oxfordshire, marsh tits were "largely absent" from parts of the wood with a dense canopy but poor shrub cover.

== Behaviour and ecology ==
In mixed winter tit flocks, seldom more than one or two marsh tits are present, and parties of this species alone are infrequent. Its performances in the bushes and branches are just as neat and agile as those of other tits; it often hangs upside down by one leg.

=== Breeding ===
Marsh tits are monogamous and often pair for life; one pair stayed together for six years. In Europe, hybridisation with the willow tit has been recorded twice.

The nest site is in a hole, usually in a tree but sometimes in a wall or in the ground. Nestboxes may be used. Old willow tit holes may be used and enlarged further. Marsh tits do not usually excavate their own nest holes, though they may enlarge the hollow, carrying the chips to a distance before dropping them. The hole may be within a centimetres or two of the ground or high as 10 m (33 ft). Inside the hole, a nest of moss is made and lined with hair and sometimes a few feathers; 20 cm (7.9 in) of moss is used in damp holes, but much less in dry ones.

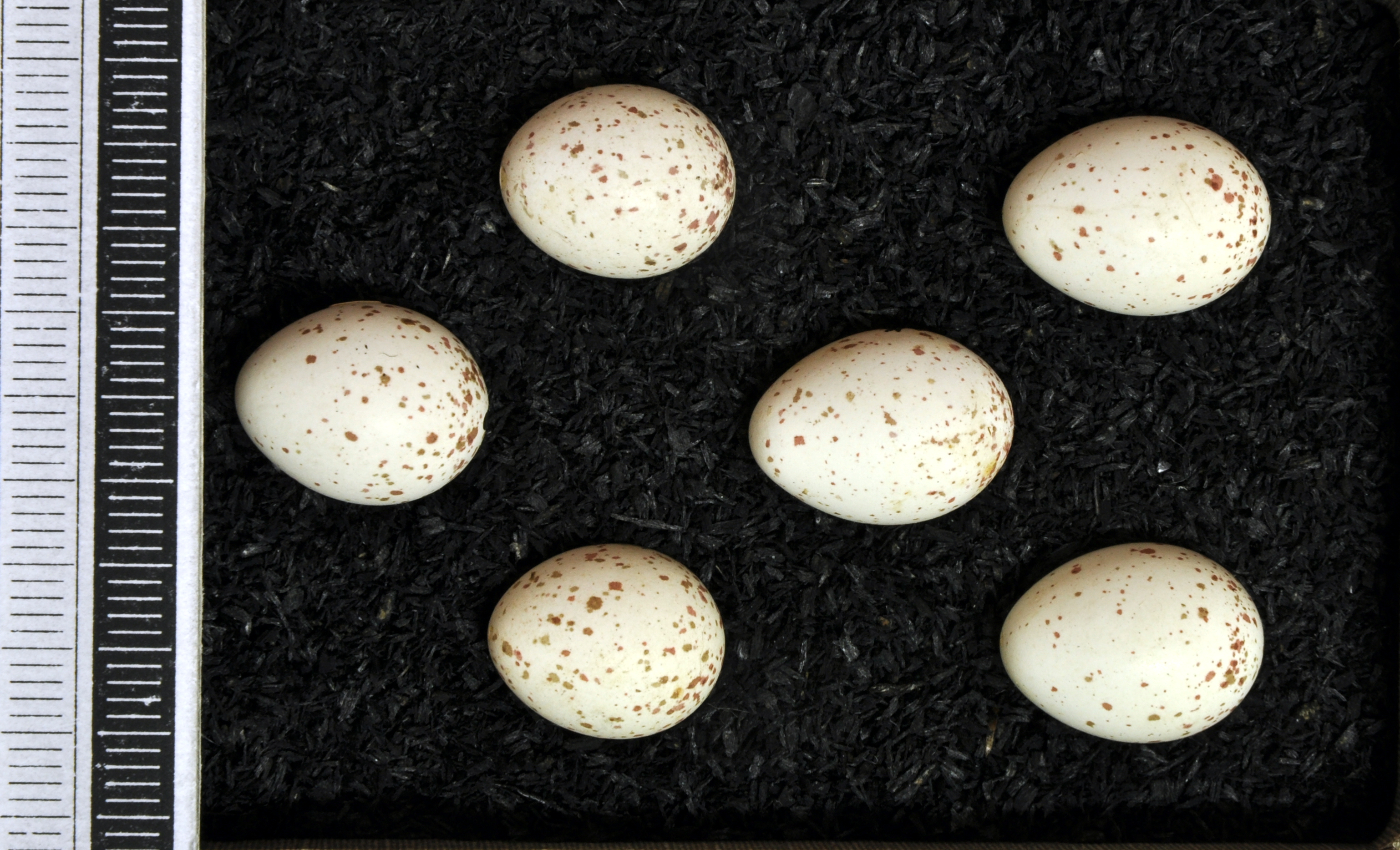
Eggs, Collection Museum Wiesbaden

Between five and nine white and red-speckled eggs are laid late in April or in May, measuring 16 mm × 12 mm (0.63 in × 0.47 in) and weighing 1.2 g (0.042 oz) each, of which 6% is shell. The eggs are incubated by the female for 14–16 days; incubation begins before the clutch is complete, meaning that the chicks hatch over a period of around two days. She sits closely and gives a typical tit "hissing display" if disturbed. The male helps to feed and care for the young and brings nearly all the food for the first four days after hatching. The altricial, downy chicks fledge after 18–21 days. The fledglings are fed by their parents for a week and become independent after a further 1–7 days. The family stays together for between 11 and 15 days after the first flights of the juveniles. Second broods have been recorded, though they are extremely rare in Britain; most are replacement clutches.

A study of marsh tits in Białowieża Forest, Poland, looked at which factors affected birds' choice to re-occupy a nest hole used the previous year. It found that 35.5% of available holes were used again the following year, and that holes where a brood had failed were less likely to be re-used. A study in Bourton Woods, Gloucestershire, England, found that nestboxes were used by marsh tits in successive years in only 20% of cases.

=== Food and feeding ===
Mostly spiders and insects are eaten in spring and summer, but seeds – including those of the thistle – nuts and berries are taken in autumn and winter. Beechmast is the preferred food when it can be found. Marsh tits often take seeds and fruit from the plant before taking them to eat elsewhere.

Marsh tits collect and store large numbers of seeds. For a study in Norway, birds were watched for two hours 15 minutes. They ate 43 and cached 83 seeds per hour. In Sweden, storing food is most frequent between September and late February, with the peak in this behaviour occurring from September to October. Hiding places for the seeds include on and in the ground, in leaf litter, in tree stumps, and under moss and lichen in trees. The hidden seeds are prone to being stolen, by other marsh tits or other species, so birds often fly from one site to another before deciding on a hiding place. They tend to retrieve the oldest items first, and memorise their location rather than searching randomly or checking systematically. The marsh tit's hippocampus is 31% bigger than that of the great tit, despite the great tit's larger overall size and larger forebrain; the relative volume of this part of the brain is greater in birds that cache food.
