= Vice-county Census Catalogue of the Vascular Plants of Great Britain =

2003 book about UK plant distribution

The Vice-county Census Catalogue of the Vascular Plants of Great Britain (ISBN 0-901158-30-5) is an A5 softback book produced in 2003 by the Botanical Society of the British Isles. It attempts to present a complete picture of the vice-county distribution of vascular plant species in Great Britain, the Isle of Man, and the Channel Islands. Its compilers were C. A. Stace, R. G. Ellis, D. H. Kent and D. J. McCosh.

== Contents of the catalogue ==
An introduction explains the purpose of the book, the history of vice-county catalogues in Britain and Ireland, the development of the 2003 work, and the rationale for recording using vice-counties and the merits of this compared with grid-square recording.

The bulk of the book (380 pages) consists of the census catalogue itself. This is presented as a list of taxa, in systematic order, with, for each taxon a list of the vice-counties in which it has been recorded. Vice-county numbers rather than names are used, in order to make efficient use of space. For each vice-county in which a taxon has been recorded, the status (native, archaeophyte, neophyte or casual) in that vice-county is indicated (through the use of different typefaces). A distinction is made between two time-periods: (i) taxa recorded since 1970 and still believed to be extant in the vice-county and (ii) taxa which have not been recorded since 1970 or which have and which are known to be extinct in that vice-county.

The catalogue contains separate entries for every species (including microspecies for all apomictic groups), as well as separate entries for all subspecies and interspecific hybrids. In total 4880 taxa are listed.

== Previous catalogue; criticism ==
The most recent publication dealing with this subject prior to the 2003 work was the Comital Flora of the British Isles by G. C. Druce, which was published in 1932.

The comprehensiveness of the work has been questioned by Hannah (2005), citing the Clyde Isles (vice-county 100), where he was able to trace 166 species for which there are records which he believed to be reliable, but which are not among the 891 listed for that vice-county.

== Errata ==
An errata list, correcting entries for 29 taxa, was published in BSBI News no. 97 p. 60

== See also ==
- List of the vascular plants of Britain and Ireland
