= Microorganisms (journal) =

- Discipline: Biology
- Language: English
- Edited by: Martin Von Bergen

Publication details
- History: 2013–present
- Publisher: MDPI
- Frequency: Continuous
- Open access: Yes
- License: Creative Commons Attribution License
- Impact factor: 4.7 (2025)

Standard abbreviations
- ISO 4: Microorganisms

Indexing
- ISSN: 2076-2607
- LCCN: 2020426864
- OCLC no.: 870683254

Links
- Journal homepage

Microorganisms is a peer-reviewed open-access scientific journal that covers various areas of microbiological research, including microbial taxonomy, molecular biology, genetics, and ecology. It is published by MDPI and was established in 2013. The editor-in-chief is Nico Jehmlich (UFZ-Helmholtz Centre for Environmental Research).

The journal publishes original research articles, review articles, and short communications.

== Abstracting and indexing ==
The journal is abstracted and indexed in:

- CAB Abstracts
- EBSCO databases
- ProQuest databases
- Science Citation Index Expanded
- Scopus

According to the Journal Citation Reports, the journal has a 2025 impact factor of 4.7.
