= UK Centre for Ecology & Hydrology =

UK environmental science research organisation

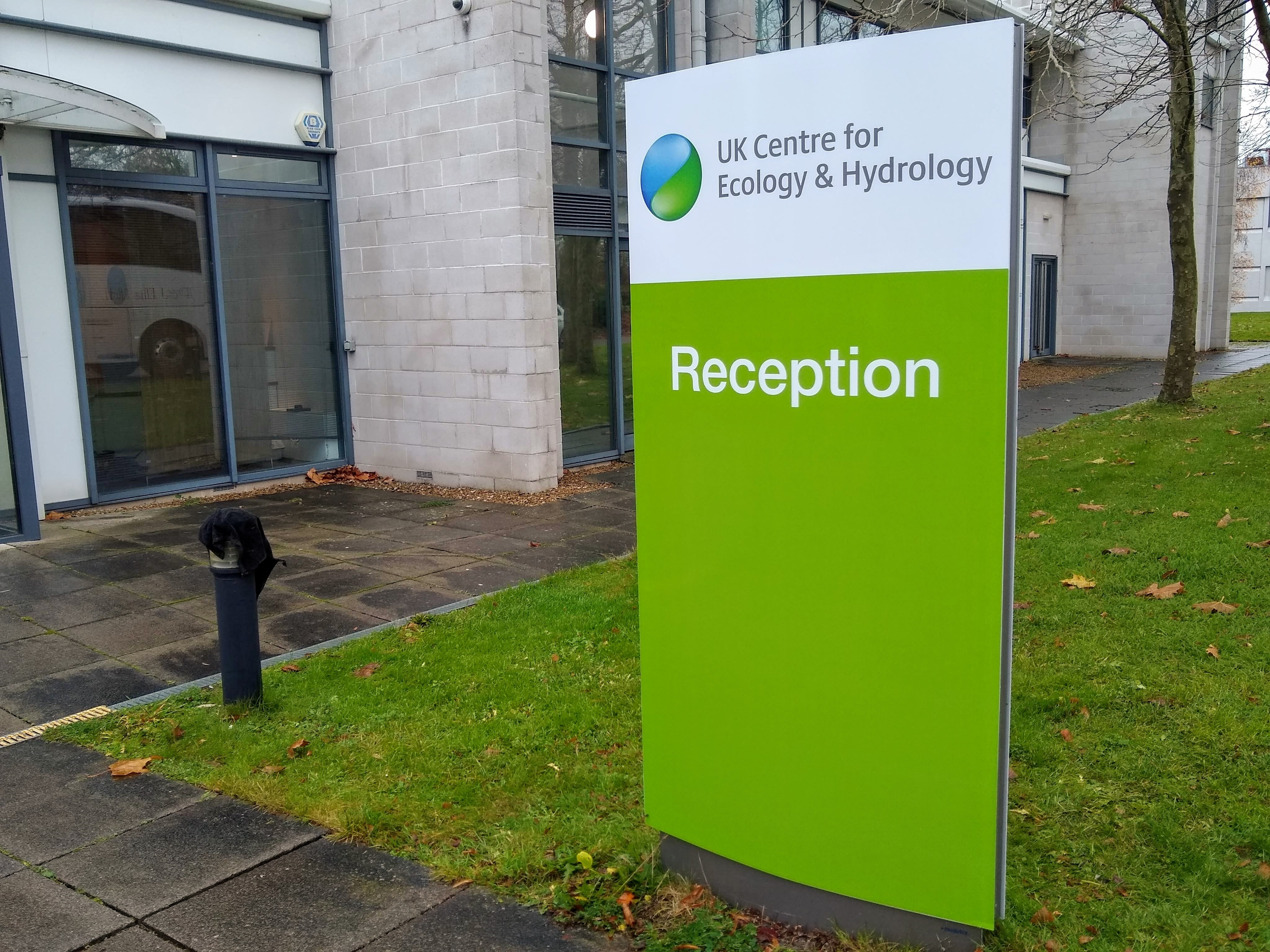
- Abbreviation: UKCEH
- Formation: 1994
- Legal status: Not-for-profit company limited by guarantee with charitable status
- Purpose: Environmental science for a world where people and nature prosper
- Headquarters: Wallingford, Oxfordshire, U.K.
- Location: UK (four sites), Accra, Ghana
- Region served: International
- Chief Executive: Stuart Wainwright
- Website: www.ceh.ac.uk

The UK Centre for Ecology & Hydrology (UKCEH, also known by the former name CEH) is a centre for excellence in environmental science across water, land and air. The organisation has a long history of investigating, monitoring and modelling environmental change. It operates from four sites in the UK and one in Ghana. Research topics include: air pollution, biodiversity, chemical risks in the environment, extreme weather events, droughts, floods, greenhouse gas emissions, soil health, sustainable agriculture, sustainable ecosystems, water quality, and water resources management.

UKCEH coordinates a number of long-term environmental science monitoring sites and programmes, including the Predatory Bird Monitoring Scheme, the Isle of May Long-Term Study, the UK National River Flow Archive, the Plynlimon catchment study, lakes monitoring at Loch Leven and in the English Lake District, the UK Cosmic-ray soil moisture monitoring network (COSMOS-UK), the UK Upland Waters Monitoring Network, the Biological Records Centre, and the UKCEH Countryside Survey. The centre manages an urban atmospheric pollution observatory at the top of BT Tower in London. Its international work includes collaboration with the World Meteorological Organization on a global hydrological monitoring initiative and working with European partners to set up butterfly and wider pollinator monitoring schemes.

UKCEH is a strategic delivery partner for the Natural Environment Research Council (NERC), part of UK Research and Innovation (UKRI). The institute has four locations: Wallingford (its headquarters), Edinburgh, Lancaster and Bangor.

UKCEH is a member of the Partnership for European Environmental Research (PEER).

== History ==
The Centre for Ecology & Hydrology (CEH) was formally established in March 1994 by John Krebs, the then chief executive of NERC. It was formed by the drawing together of four research institutes: the Institute of Hydrology, the Institute of Terrestrial Ecology, the Institute of Freshwater Ecology and the Institute of Virology and Environmental Microbiology (IVEM).

In 1994, Brian Wilkinson, a professor of civil engineering at Cranfield University, director of the Institute of Hydrology, was appointed as the first CEH director. In 1994 CEH had 15 laboratories and field stations across the UK. From 1996 onwards the number of sites was reduced and the centre now operates from 4 locations across the UK.

In the early years there was a need to integrate environmental science across the institutes: joint science programs were established together with an inter-disciplinary science fund. CEH expanded and by 1999 there were some 600 staff and about 300 students linked to the universities, with most registered for post-graduate qualification. CEH had global outreach with around 60 worldwide research projects. A new headquarters was constructed on the Wallingford site.

In 1999 Wilkinson retired and Mike Roberts was appointed as CEH director. He was succeeded by Professor Nuttall in 2001. In 2012 Professor Mark Bailey was appointed to the position of executive director.

In December 2019, following UK Government approval, the Centre for Ecology & Hydrology became autonomous from UK Research and Innovation (UKRI) and the Natural Environment Research Council (NERC), launching as a not-for-profit company limited by guarantee with charitable status on 1 December that year. At the same time, it also changed its name to the UK Centre for Ecology & Hydrology (UKCEH).

Dr Stuart Wainwright OBE became chief executive in June 2023.

Judith Batchelar OBE, became Chair of the UKCEH Board of Trustees in December 2024.

== Notable research and outputs ==
- In 2008 the centre published a hydrological appraisal of the notable flooding in England and Wales in summer 2007.
- In 2010 the centre led research that showed the seasonal timings of biological events in springs and summers were shifting forward in the UK, and that the trend was accelerating.
- In 2017 the centre published research on the impact on honeybees of two commercial neonicotinoid-based seed treatments in commercially grown crops of oilseed rape.
- The centre hosts the UK National River Flow Archive, which publishes monthly UK hydrological summaries and hydrological outlooks.
- The centre is a pioneer in citizen science and hosts the Biological Records Centre in the UK and the iRecord biological records website. It has created numerous biological recording phone apps such as iRecord Butterflies, Asian Hornet Watch and Bloomin' Algae. In 2020 the Biological Records Centre received 1.77 million records from more than 20,000 contributors, covering over 24,000 species.
- It organises and funds the UK Butterfly Monitoring Scheme (UKBMS), along with Butterfly Conservation, the British Trust for Ornithology and the Joint Nature Conservation Committee. UKBMS is one of the longest running insect monitoring schemes in the world.
- It creates and licenses satellite-derived annual UK land cover maps and crop maps.
- UKCEH coordinates development of the Joint UK Land Environment Simulator (JULES) land surface model with the UK Met Office. JULES is used both as a standalone model and as the land surface component in the Met Office Unified Model, used for weather forecasting in the UK.
- The centre is part of a major research consortium announced by the UK Government in August 2021 to help the UK adapt and become more resilient to the impacts of climate change.
- It coordinates international science efforts to encourage sustainable nitrogen management.
- UKCEH is one of the partners in the UK National Climate Science Partnership, announced at COP26 in 2021.

== Notable people ==
- Ewen Cameron, Baron Cameron of Dillington, Chair of UKCEH Board of Trustees until November 2024
- Mark J. Bailey, executive director until June 2023
- Mark O. Hill, mathematical ecologist and botanist known for developing Hill numbers, a type of diversity index used in ecology, as well as detrended correspondence analysis (DCA), two-way indicator species analysis (TWINSPAN), and the frequency scaling using local occupancy ("FreScaLo") technique used for adjusting for variable sampling effort in species' distribution time trends
- Pat Nuttall, director between 2001 and 2011
- Christopher D. Preston, botanist and historian, known for editing various vascular plant and bryophyte species distribution atlases for Britain and Ireland
- Mike Roberts, director between 1999 and 2001
- Helen Roy, principal scientist-ecologist at UKCEH and president of the Royal Entomological Society between 2020-2022
- Mark Sutton, nitrogen scientist and chair of the International Nitrogen Initiative
- Sarah Wanless, ornithologist and seabird ecologist
- Brian Wilkinson, director between 1994 and 1999

== See also ==
- OpenMI Standard · UKCEH is the lead organisation for the Open Modelling Interface standard.
