= Clive A. Stace =

British botanist and botanical author

Clive Anthony Stace
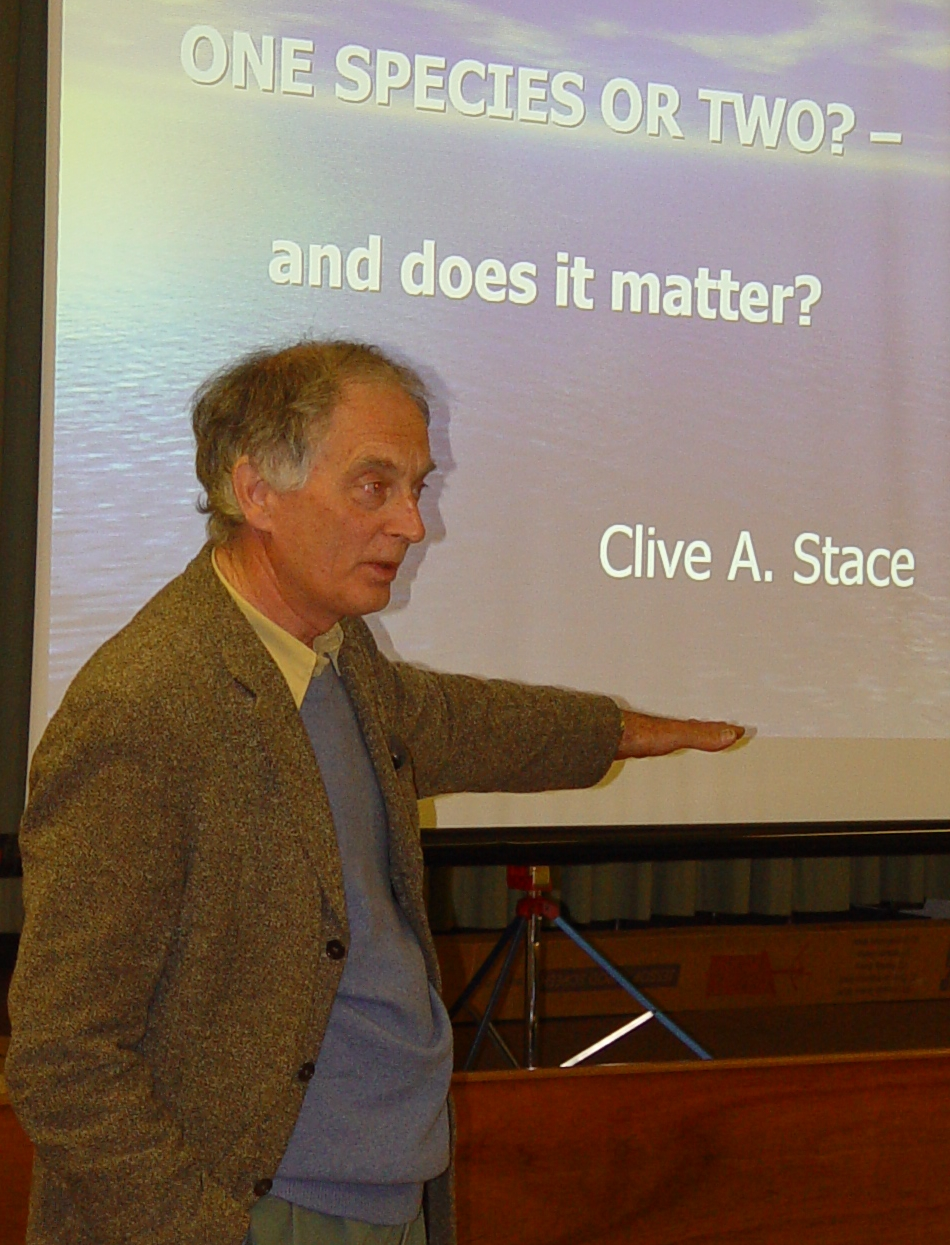
- Clive Stace, lecturing to members of Derby Natural History Society in April 2005.
- Born: 1938 (age 87–88); Tunbridge Wells, UK
- Education: University of London
- Spouse: Margaret Stace
- Scientific career
- Fields: botanist; taxonomy, biosystematics, cytogenetics
- Workplaces: University of Manchester; University of Leicester
- Doctoral advisor: Arthur Wallis Exell
- Website: www.clivestace.com

Clive Anthony Stace (born 1938) is a British botanist and botanical author. He studied at King's College London, graduated from University of London in 1959 and then studied at the Natural History Museum, London. He was awarded a PhD in 1963. His academic career was based at the University of Leicester, where he held the post of Professor of Plant taxonomy. He is a past president of the Botanical Society of Britain and Ireland from 1987 to 1989.

== Career ==
The New Flora of the British Isles, first published in 1991 with subsequent revised editions, is considered the authoritative and comprehensive flora of the British Isles for the late twentieth and early twenty-first century. It aims to include all the taxa that could reasonably found in the British Isles during the year and also to keep up with developments in taxonomy. The second edition was substantially improved over the first in terms of general appearance, typography and illustrations as well as by including chromosome numbers and an index, as well as species included. As a consequence, by the 2nd edition, 4630 species and hybrid were covered. The native flora of the British Isles comprises around 1190 non-apomictic species, so very many are naturalised species. Line drawings from the second edition onwards, along with some black and white photographs, provide illustrations of key features for some species.

In 2012, a newly described grass species, Brachypodium stacei (previously regarded as a form of purple false brome), was named in his honour. In 2019 Stace was awarded the Marsh Botany Award in recognition of his lifetime's work as a plant taxonomist but in particular the fourth edition of his New Flora of the British Isles which has become the standard flora of the British Isles.

== Works ==
He has also been responsible for a number of notable publications relating to the vascular plant flora of Britain and Ireland:

- edited by Stace, C.A. 1975 Hybridization and the flora of the British Isles Academic Press in collaboration with The Botanical Society of the British Isles, London, New York, San Francisco. ISBN 0-12-661650-7. 626 pp.
- Stace, C.A., New Flora of the British Isles 1991 (ed 2 1997; ed 3 2010; ed 4 2019) C & M Floristics, Middlewood Green, Suffolk. ISBN 978-1-527226-30-2. (in-line drawings mainly by Hilli Thompson; enhancement of illustrations and desk-top publishing by Margaret Stace) 1266pp.
- Stace, C.A., Ellis, R.G., Kent, D.H. and D. J. McCosh. 2003 Vice-county Census Catalogue of the Vascular Plants of Great Britain Botanical Society of the British Isles, ISBN 0-901158-30-5. 380pp.
- Clive A. Stace and Michael J. Crawley 2015 Alien Plants New Naturalist Library Book 129. William Collins ISBN 978-000750215-8. 640pp
- Stace, C.A., Preston, C.D. & Pearman, D.A. 2015. Hybrid flora of the British Isles. Bristol: Botanical Society of Britain and Ireland. ISBN 978-0-901158-48-2. 501 pp.

He also wrote the student textbook Plant Taxonomy and Biosystematics (1980, 2nd ed 1991) (Contemporary Biology Series) Edward Arnold, then Cambridge University Press. ISBN 978-0-521427-85-2. 272pp
