= Nature Conservancy (disambiguation) =

The Nature Conservancy is a global charitable organization.

Nature Conservancy may also refer to:

- Nature Conservancy of Canada, a Canadian organization
- Nature Conservancy (UK), the former UK government organization
