= Christian Wissel =

German physicist and ecologist

Christian Wissel is a German a physicist and an pioneer of ecological modelling in West-Germany.

Wissel was born in 1948 and studied physics. He was professor at the University of Marburg. e developed computer based population models. Wissel became the important pioneer of modern ecological modelling in Germany. He became known for his involvement in the study of population dynamics and survival analysis—work that is reflected in various publications and specialized software, such as META-X (used for analyzing the viability of metapopulations).

Wissel established an influential department at the Helmholtz Centre for Environmental Research (UFZ) and led it until his retirement in 2005.

== Selected publications ==
- chriSimone K. Heinz, Christian Wissel & Karin Frank: The Viability of Metapopulations: Individual Dispersal Behaviour Matters In: Landscape Ecology Volume 21, pages 77–89 (2006) doi:10.1007/s10980-005-0148-3
- V. Grimm & Christian Wissel: Babel, or the ecological stability discussions: an inventory and analysis of terminology and a guide for avoiding confusion In: Oecologia Volume 109, Pages 323–334 (1997) doi:10.1007/s004420050090
- Birgit Müller, Karin Frank & Christian Wissel: Relevance of rest periods in non-equilibrium rangeland systems – A modelling analysis In Agricultural Systems Volume 92, Issues 1–3, January 2007, Pages 295-317 doi:10.1016/j.agsy.2006.03.010
- Christian Wissel: Theoretische Ökologie. Eine Einführung Springer, 30 August 1989, ISBN 978-3-540-50848-9 doi:10.1007/978-3-642-74535-5
