= Gordon McGregor Reid =

Gordon McGregor Reid PPFLS (born 9 February 1948) was Director General and Chief Executive of the North of England Zoological Society, popularly known as Chester Zoo. He stepped down in 2010. The North of England Zoological Society is an independent charity for conservation, education and science. It is also one of the leading wildlife attractions in the UK, receiving well over one million paying guests each year.

Under Gordon McGregor Reid's leadership, this major wildlife attraction has gained more than 100 international, national and regional awards for success in conservation, environment management education, science, and business excellence, including the Queen's Award for Enterprise in the category of Sustainable Development–the highest business accolade in the UK.

== Africa research ==
From humble beginnings as a 16-year-old technician in the zoology department at Glasgow University, Gordon rose to conduct leading research into aquatic life in Botswana and Nigeria. He completed his PhD at King's College London with a thesis on the morphology of tropical fish.

In recent years, he has taken Chester Zoo from strength to strength to its current position as the sixth largest visitor attraction in the UK, with 6,000 animals of 600 species, half of them on the World Conservation Union's endangered list.

In 2008 Gordon was made an Honorary Doctor in Science for his contribution to knowledge of the natural world from the Faculty of Science and Engineering at Manchester Metropolitan University (MMU). The conservation work of the zoo spans more than 50 countries, including Kenya, where it works with MMU’s Behaviour and Ecology Group on the Chyulu Project for Rhino Conservation. MMU is soon to embark on a new Masters programme in Zoo Conservation Biology, jointly run with Chester Zoo.

== Death of Staff and UK Health & Safety Ruling ==
Professor Gordon Reid, director of the North of England Zoological Society, which runs Chester Zoo, admitted at Chester Crown Court that the law on health and safety had been broken. The Zoo was fined 25,000. Elephant keeper Richard Hughes, 34, died following the incident at Chester Zoo on February 8, 2001. https://www.manchestereveningnews.co.uk/news/greater-manchester-news/25000-fine-on-death-zoo-1130233

== Recognition ==
He has served as president of the Linnean Society of London (2003-2006), president of rECOrd (Local Biological Records Centre for Cheshire), president of the World Association of Zoos and Aquariums

IUCN-CBSG Ulysses Seal Medal for Conservation Innovation (2010); Gold Medal of North of England Zoological Society;E.D. Le Cren Medal of the Fisheries Society of the British Isles; Heini Hediger Award of the World Association of Zoos and Aquariums; IUCN Chair's Citation for Excellence; ZSL Award for Outstanding Contributions to the Zoo Community; EAZA Lifetime Achievements Award for Conservation, Education and Science; DSc (and Medal) Manchester Metropolitan University; DSc University of Chester; Honorary Fellowship Liverpool John Moore's University.
