= Partnership for European Environmental Research =

Environmental research cooperative

Partnership for European Environmental Research (PEER) is a network of seven European environmental research centres, created in 2001.

One of the aims of PEER is to foster innovative interdisciplinary research and cross-cutting approaches in support of national and EU policy-makers, industry and society. Member institutes employ about 15,200 persons and have a combined annual budget of 1.6 billion euro.

Member institutes have for example training and research co-operation. Through its METIER courses, PEER centres have trained young researchers.

== Joint projects ==
In recent climate change projects, PEER studied climate policy integration and compared adaptation strategies in European countries. The final reports of these projects deal with several aspects of implementing climate policy in Europe. The first report analyses the adaptation strategies of the EU member states, identifying a number of common strengths and weaknesses of the current strategies in the countries studied. The second report assesses the degree of climate policy integration in six different European countries, at national and local levels, as well as within key policy sectors such as energy and transport. It analyses measures and means to enhance climate policy integration and improve policy coherence. The reports show that communication and awareness raising is going to be important to get public support for adaptation measures, and to help stakeholders to adapt. Since adaptation is very different from mitigation, communication should be designed specifically for that purpose, including exchange of experiences on adaptation practices. Although the inclusion of climate change mitigation and adaptation in general governmental programmes and strategies has substantially increased in recent years, much more is needed in terms of integrating climate issues into specific policy measures. Annual budgets, environmental impact assessments and spatial planning procedures are three examples of existing measures which we believe have significant potential to be climate policy instruments.

PEER Research on EcoSystem Services (PRESS) initiative addresses the existing knowledge gaps in land-use information to perform a spatially-explicit, biophysical, monetary and policy assessment of ecosystem services in Europe. Also, it aims to reflect the social and economic values of ecosystem services. The third PEER report demonstrates methodologies to map at different spatial scales the role of ecosystems as providers of recreation to citizens and the function of river networks in providing clean water. The report investigates how ecosystem services can be mainstreamed into agriculture, fisheries or forestry policies. It includes an analysis of policy options and shows that the perception of what services are provided by ecosystems varies according to the respondents, the region and the scales of decision-making. A fourth report summarizes the final results of the PRESS projects for policy makers. The full technical version of the same report is also available at the PEER website.

== Member centres ==
- Alterra – The Institute for Applied Environmental Research of Wageningen University and Research Centre, The Netherlands
- Centre for Ecology & Hydrology (CEH), United Kingdom
- National Research Institute for Agriculture, Food and the Environment (INRAE), France
- Joint Research Centre, Institute for Environment and Sustainability (JRC-IES), European Commission
- DCE - Danish Centre for Environment and Energy, Aarhus University, Aarhus University, Denmark
- Finnish Environment Institute (SYKE), Finland
- Helmholtz Centre for Environmental Research (UFZ), Germany
