= Vice-county =

Biological recording division of the British Isles

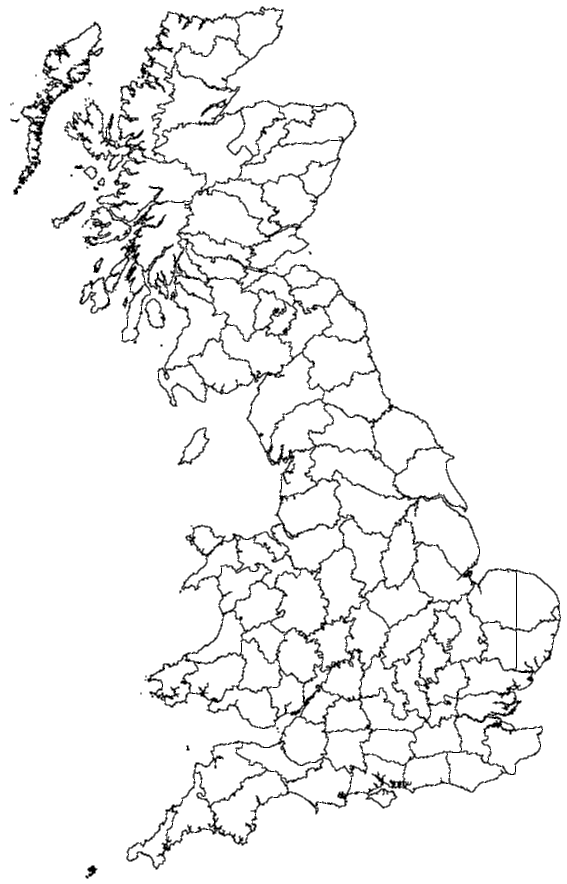
Vice-counties of Great Britain and the Isle of Man (Orkney and Shetland not shown)

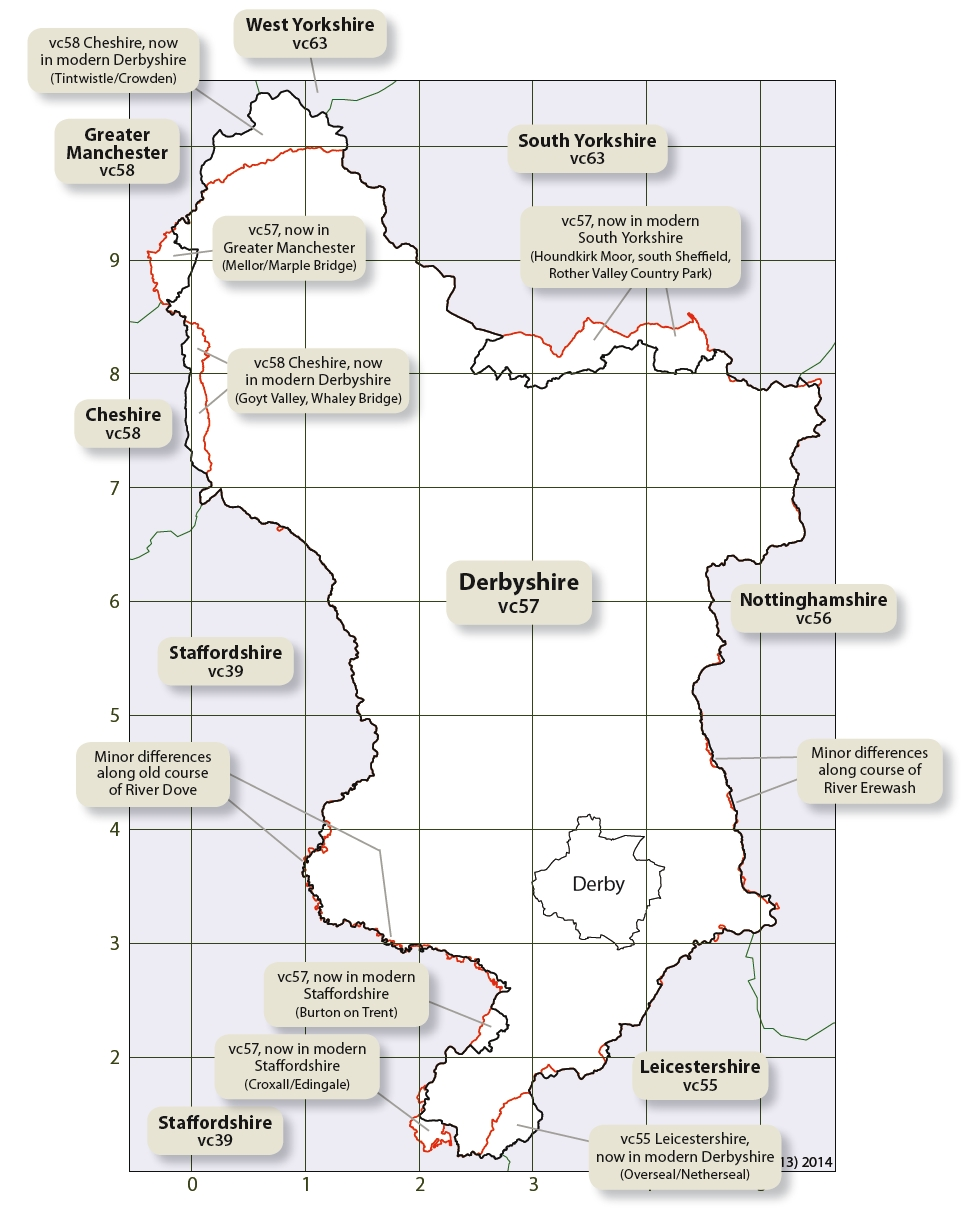
Map showing detailed differences between Derbyshire vice-county (VC57) and the modern administrative county of Derbyshire, England

A vice-county (also spelled vice county) is a geographical division of the British Isles. It is also called biological vice-county as it is used for purposes of biological recording and other scientific data-gathering, or sometimes called a Watsonian vice-county as vice-counties were introduced by Hewett Cottrell Watson in the third volume of his Cybele Britannica, published in 1852. Watson's vice-counties were based on the ancient counties of Britain, but often subdividing these boundaries to create smaller, more uniform units, and considering exclaves to be part of the surrounding vice-county.

In 1901 Robert Lloyd Praeger introduced a similar system for Ireland and its off-shore islands.

Vice-counties are the "standard geographical area for county based [...] recording". They provide a stable basis for recording using similarly sized units, and, although National Grid-based reporting has grown in popularity, vice-counties remain a useful mapping boundary, employed in many regional surveys, especially county floras and national lists. This allows data collected over long periods of time to be compared easily. The vice-counties remain unchanged by subsequent local government reorganisations, allowing historical and modern data to be more accurately compared.

In 2002, to mark the 150th anniversary of the introduction of the Watsonian vice-county system, the NBN Trust commissioned the digitisation of the 112 vice-county boundaries for England, Scotland and Wales, based on 420 original one-inch to the mile maps annotated by Dandy in 1947, and held at the Natural History Museum, London. The resulting datafiles were much more detailed than anything readily available to recorders up to that point, and were made freely available (as a beta version). Intended for use with modern GIS and biological recording software, a final 'standard' version was released in 2008. Up until that point, county recorders only had general access to a set of two fold-out vice-county maps covering the entirety of Great Britain, published in 1969.

== Vice-county systems ==
The vice-county system was first introduced by Hewett Cottrell Watson in the third volume of his Cybele Britannica published in 1852. He refined the system in later volumes. The geographical area that Watson called "Britain" consisted of the island of Great Britain with all of its offshore islands, plus the Isle of Man, but excluding the Channel Islands. This area was divided into 112 vice-counties with larger counties divided; for example, Devon into the vice-counties of North Devon and South Devon, and Yorkshire into five vice-counties. Each of these 112 vice-counties has a name and a number. Thus Vice-county 38, often abbreviated to "VC38", is called "Warwickshire".

In 1901, Robert Lloyd Praeger extended the system of vice-counties to Ireland and its off-shore islands, based on an earlier suggestion by C. C. Babington in 1859. The Irish vice-counties were based on the historic 32 counties of Ireland, with the six largest being sub-divided; for example, the county of Cork was divided into three vice-counties. This produced a total of 40 vice-counties for Ireland, which were numbered from H1 to H40 ("H" for "Hibernia"). As with the 112 vice-counties of Britain, each vice-county has a name as well as a number. Thus Vice-county (or VC) H3 is "West Cork".

Combining these two systems produces a 152 vice-county system. The exclusion of the Channel Islands from Watson's system for Britain has led to variations between different recording schemes. The geographical area covered by the 152 vice-counties may be described as the "British Isles", as in the 2008 Checklist of Beetles of the British Isles. Other recording schemes regard the "British Isles" as including the Channel Islands. As they are not part of the 152 vice-county system, the Channel Islands may be added as an extra vice-county, making 153 in total, being indicated by letter codes such as "C" or "CI". Less usually, each of the five separate islands may be treated as a vice-county, giving 157 vice-counties in total.

Alternative counts of vice-counties used in different recording schemes are shown in the table below.

Alternative counts of vice-counties
Count	Originator	Descriptions
112	Watson	Great Britain (including the Isle of Man)
40	Praeger	Ireland
0, 1 or 5		Channel Islands (Jersey, Guernsey, Alderney, Sark and Herm)
152, 153 or 157		British Isles, (Great) Britain and Ireland

The vice-counties of Britain alone may be described as "Watsonian vice-counties", or this term may be used for the combined vice-counties of Britain and Ireland, which may also be described as "Watson-Praeger vice-counties". In all cases, the Channel Islands may be excluded or included, so that the count of vice-counties varies, as noted in the table above.

== List of vice-counties ==
=== Southern England ===
VC	Vice county
VC1	West Cornwall with Scilly
VC2	East Cornwall
VC3	South Devon
VC4	North Devon
VC5	South Somerset
VC6	North Somerset
VC7	North Wiltshire
VC8	South Wiltshire
VC9	Dorset
VC10	Isle of Wight
VC11	South Hampshire
VC12	North Hampshire
VC13	West Sussex
VC14	East Sussex
VC15	East Kent
VC16	West Kent
VC17	Surrey
VC18	South Essex
VC19	North Essex
VC20	Hertfordshire
VC21	Middlesex
VC22	Berkshire
VC23	Oxfordshire
VC24	Buckinghamshire
VC25	East Suffolk
VC26	West Suffolk
VC27	East Norfolk
VC28	West Norfolk
VC29	Cambridgeshire
VC30	Bedfordshire
VC31	Huntingdonshire
VC32	Northamptonshire
VC33	East Gloucestershire
VC34	West Gloucestershire

=== Northern England, Wales ===
VC	Vice county
VC35	Monmouthshire
VC36	Herefordshire
VC37	Worcestershire
VC38	Warwickshire
VC39	Staffordshire
VC40	Shropshire
VC41	Glamorganshire
VC42	Breconshire
VC43	Radnorshire
VC44	Carmarthenshire
VC45	Pembrokeshire
VC46	Cardiganshire
VC47	Montgomeryshire
VC48	Merionethshire
VC49	Caernarvonshire
VC50	Denbighshire
VC51	Flintshire
VC52	Anglesey
VC53	South Lincolnshire
VC54	North Lincolnshire
VC55	Leicestershire with Rutland
VC56	Nottinghamshire
VC57	Derbyshire
VC58	Cheshire
VC59	South Lancashire
VC60	West Lancashire
VC61	South-east Yorkshire
VC62	North-east Yorkshire
VC63	South-west Yorkshire
VC64	Mid-west Yorkshire
VC65	North-west Yorkshire
VC66	County Durham
VC67	South Northumberland
VC68	North Northumberland
VC69	Westmorland with Furness
VC70	Cumberland

=== Scotland, Isle of Man ===
VC	Vice county
VC71	Isle of Man
VC72	Dumfriesshire
VC73	Kirkcudbrightshire
VC74	Wigtownshire
VC75	Ayrshire
VC76	Renfrewshire
VC77	Lanarkshire
VC78	Peeblesshire
VC79	Selkirkshire
VC80	Roxburghshire
VC81	Berwickshire
VC82	East Lothian
VC83	Midlothian
VC84	West Lothian
VC85	Fifeshire
VC86	Stirlingshire
VC87	West Perthshire
VC88	Mid Perthshire
VC89	East Perthshire
VC90	Angus
VC91	Kincardineshire
VC92	South Aberdeenshire
VC93	North Aberdeenshire
VC94	Banffshire
VC95	Moray
VC96	East Inverness-shire
VC97	West Inverness-shire
VC98	Argyllshire
VC99	Dunbartonshire
VC100	Clyde Isles
VC101	Kintyre
VC102	South Ebudes
VC103	Mid Ebudes
VC104	North Ebudes
VC105	West Ross & Cromarty
VC106	East Ross & Cromarty
VC107	East Sutherland
VC108	West Sutherland
VC109	Caithness
VC110	Outer Hebrides
VC111	Orkney
VC112	Shetland

=== Ireland ===
VC	Vice county
H1	South Kerry
H2	North Kerry
H3	West Cork
H4	Mid-Cork
H5	East Cork
H6	Waterford
H7	South Tipperary
H8	Limerick
H9	Clare
H10	North Tipperary
H11	Kilkenny
H12	Wexford
H13	Carlow
H14	Laois
H15	South-east Galway
H16	West Galway
H17	North-east Galway
H18	Offaly
H19	Kildare
H20	Wicklow
H21	Dublin
H22	Meath
H23	Westmeath
H24	Longford
H25	Roscommon
H26	East Mayo
H27	West Mayo
H28	Sligo
H29	Leitrim
H30	Cavan
H31	Louth
H32	Monaghan
H33	Fermanagh
H34	East Donegal
H35	West Donegal
H36	Tyrone
H37	Armagh
H38	Down
H39	Antrim
H40	Londonderry

== Vice-counties of Ireland listed by county, province and jurisdiction ==
Praeger's fieldwork mostly predates and ignores the county boundary changes made in 1899 under the Local Government (Ireland) Act 1898. Divergences from the pre-1899 boundaries are noted below.

Irish vice counties

Vice-counties of Ireland
VC	Vice county	County	Province	Jurisdiction
H1	South Kerry	Kerry	Munster	Republic of Ireland
H2	North Kerry	Kerry	Munster	Republic of Ireland
H3	West Cork	Cork	Munster	Republic of Ireland
H4	Mid-Cork	Cork	Munster	Republic of Ireland
H5	East Cork	Cork	Munster	Republic of Ireland
H6	Waterford	Waterford (Note: County Waterford (Munster) north of the River Suir (i.e. Kilculliheen) is in Kilkenny vice-county (Leinster))	Munster	Republic of Ireland
H7	South Tipperary (Note: The North and South Tipperary vice-counties are divided by the Dublin–Cork railway line and do not correspond to the county's North and South ridings.)	Tipperary	Munster	Republic of Ireland
H8	Limerick	Limerick (Note: County Limerick north-west of the River Shannon (i.e. the North Liberties) is in Clare vice-county)	Munster	Republic of Ireland
H9	Clare	Clare (Note: The Aran Islands (County Galway, Connacht) are in Clare vice-county (Munster)) (Note: The only 1899 transfer accepted by Praeger is the land east of Lough Derg transferred from Galway (Connacht) to Clare (Munster).)	Munster	Republic of Ireland
H10	North Tipperary	Tipperary	Munster	Republic of Ireland
H11	Kilkenny	Kilkenny	Leinster	Republic of Ireland
H12	Wexford	Wexford	Leinster	Republic of Ireland
H13	Carlow	Carlow	Leinster	Republic of Ireland
H14	Queen's County	Laois	Leinster	Republic of Ireland
H15	South-east Galway	Galway	Connacht	Republic of Ireland
H16	West Galway	Galway (Note: Praeger's 1933 map inconsistently includes in West Mayo an area transferred from Galway to Mayo under the 1898 act; his 1901 map has it in West Galway.)	Connacht	Republic of Ireland
H17	North-east Galway	Galway	Connacht	Republic of Ireland
H18	King's County	Offaly	Leinster	Republic of Ireland
H19	Kildare	Kildare	Leinster	Republic of Ireland
H20	Wicklow	Wicklow	Leinster	Republic of Ireland
H21	Dublin	Dublin	Leinster	Republic of Ireland
H22	Meath	Meath	Leinster	Republic of Ireland
H23	Westmeath	Westmeath	Leinster	Republic of Ireland
H24	Longford	Longford	Leinster	Republic of Ireland
H25	Roscommon	Roscommon	Connacht	Republic of Ireland
H26	East Mayo	Mayo	Connacht	Republic of Ireland
H27	West Mayo	Mayo	Connacht	Republic of Ireland
H28	Sligo	Sligo	Connacht	Republic of Ireland
H29	Leitrim	Leitrim	Connacht	Republic of Ireland
H30	Cavan	Cavan	Ulster	Republic of Ireland
H31	Louth	Louth	Leinster	Republic of Ireland
H32	Monaghan	Monaghan	Ulster	Republic of Ireland
H33	Fermanagh	Fermanagh	Ulster	Northern Ireland
H34	East Donegal	Donegal (Note: The area of County Londonderry (Northern Ireland) west of the River Foyle is in East Donegal vice-county (Republic of Ireland).)	Ulster	Republic of Ireland
H35	West Donegal	Donegal	Ulster	Republic of Ireland
H36	Tyrone	Tyrone	Ulster	Northern Ireland
H37	Armagh	Armagh	Ulster	Northern Ireland
H38	Down	Down	Ulster	Northern Ireland
H39	Antrim	Antrim	Ulster	Northern Ireland
H40	Londonderry	Londonderry	Ulster	Northern Ireland

== See also ==
- Subdivisions of England
- Subdivisions of Scotland
- Subdivisions of Wales
- Local government in Northern Ireland
- Counties of Ireland
