= Biological recording =

Technique in biology for recording presence and distribution of all living organisms

Biological recording is the scientific study of the distribution of living organisms, biological records describe the presence, abundance, associations and changes, both in time and space, of wildlife. There has been a long tradition of biological recording in the United Kingdom dating back to John Ray (1627–1705), Robert Plot (1640–1696) and their contemporaries.

== Methods ==
The basis of a biological record is the 'four Ws':

- What: the identification of the organism recorded
- Where: The locality where the organism was seen
- When: the date (and time) when the organism was recorded
- Who: the person or persons making the observation

Additionally a variety of additional information is often necessary to increase the value of any biological record, including:

- How: the method of recording the observation, e.g. pitfall trap or moth trap

== Biological recording in the UK ==
In the UK biological recording is a popular hobby and much is organised by national recording schemes for many taxonomic groups of which almost 90 are registered with the national Biological Records Centre.

At a national level biological records are managed by the Biological Records Centre, originally set up at Monks Wood Experimental Station, but now based at Wallingford in Oxfordshire which has operated since 1964 to manage records of the country's biodiversity. Following the CCBR report in 1995 the National Biodiversity Network was established as an ideal. This is overseen by the NBN Trust which is responsible for the NBN Gateway which in May 2016 passed 127 million records.

At a local level there are a number of field natural history clubs promoting biological recording, including Essex Field Club and Sandwell Valley Naturalists' Club. On a professional level, most of the UK is covered by a network of Local Environmental Records Centres. It was estimated in 1995 that over 60,000 individuals were actively and directly involved in biological recording of which the vast majority were voluntarily engaged out of personal interest.

== Additional References ==
- Biological Records Centre, Wallingford
- The Association of Local Environmental Records Centres
- National Forum for Biological Recording
