= Two-way indicator species analysis =

Statistical analysis method

Two-way indicator species analysis (TWINSPAN) is a Fortran-based statistical analysis method described in 1979 by Mark O. Hill. It is widely used in ecological research.

As of 1997, it was the only widespread standardized method to identify indicator plants.
