= Helmholtz Centre for Environmental Research =

Research institute in Leipzig, Germany

Helmholtz Centre for Environmental Research – UFZ
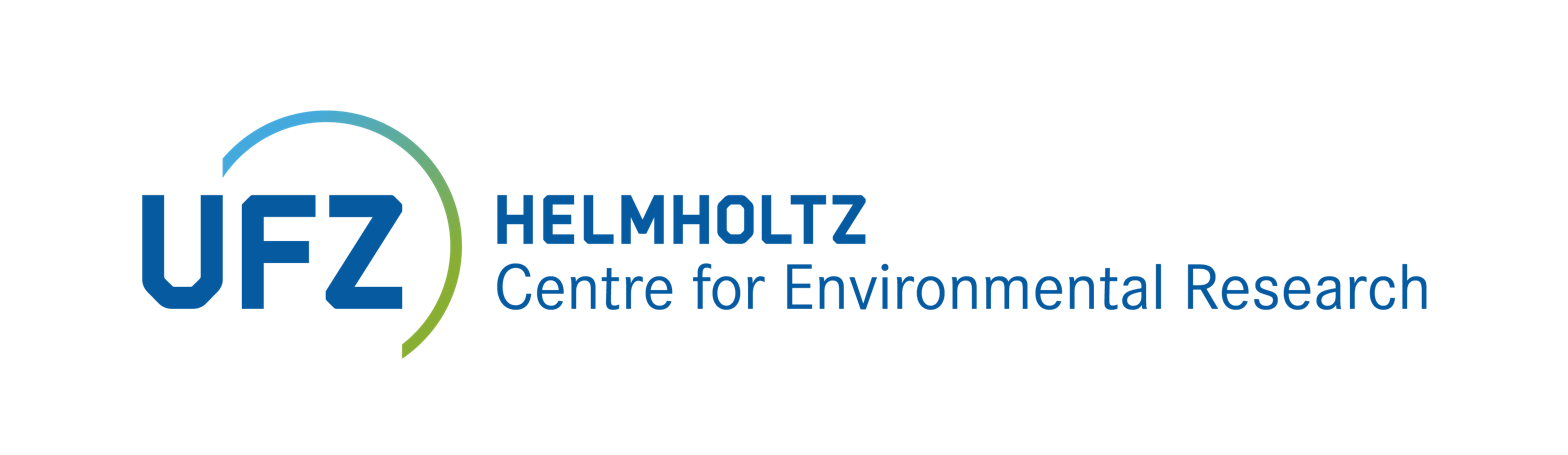
- Predecessor: UFZ-Umweltforschungszentrum Leipzig-Halle GmbH
- Established: 1991; 35 years ago
- Type: Registered association
- Headquarters: Leipzig, Halle and Magdeburg
- Scientific Managing Director: Katrin Böhning-Gaese
- Budget: € 135,4 million (2025)
- Employees: 1.241 (Dec. 2025)
- Website: www.ufz.de

The Helmholtz Centre for Environmental Research – UFZ (prior to 28 November 2006 UFZ-Umweltforschungszentrum Leipzig-Halle GmbH) is an institution seeking to research more sustainable uses of nature and the environment. It is one of the most prominent centers for biodiversity, nature conservation and environmental policy research on a systemic level in Germany, performing both basic and applied research. The UFZ is one of the largest members of the Helmholtz Association of Research Centres.

The founding of the UFZ was closely linked to German reunification; established on December 12, 1991, the center was intended to develop approaches for addressing the massive environmental pollution in the former GDR—particularly in the Leipzig-Halle-Bitterfeld lignite-mining region and the areas dominated by heavy chemical industry.

UFZ distinctive feature is the interdisciplinary approach: natural sciences, engineering, and the social sciences working side by side to tackle environmental problems.

== History ==
The Centre commenced its research activities on 2 January 1992. At the time of its founding, existing structures and personnel from former institutes of the GDR Academy of Sciences e.g., those focused on isotope and radiation research and biotechnology, as well as the Academy of Agricultural Sciences (Akademie der Landwirtschaftswissenschaften) were partly integrated and realigned. That is why the center has locations in Leipzig, Halle and Magdeburg. In addition, it operates an experimental station in Bad Lauchstädt, Saxony-Anhalt.

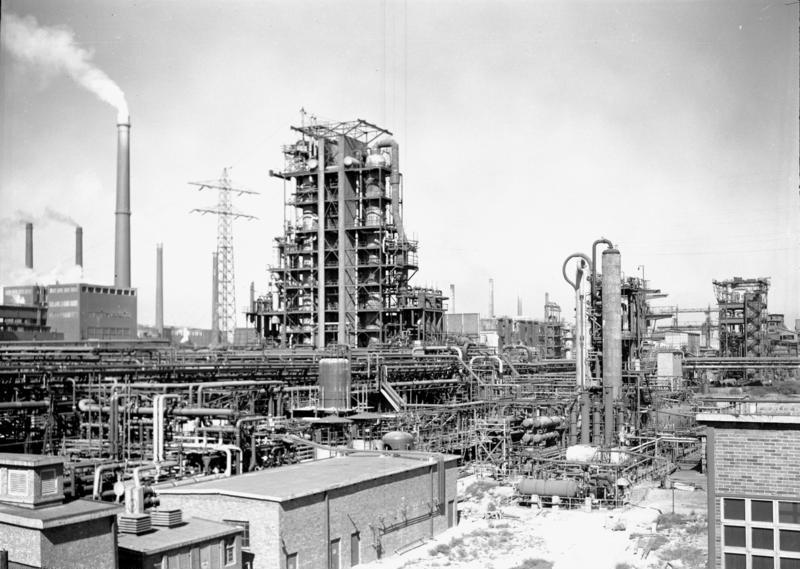
Destillation devision of Leuna works in 1959

In the years following its founding, the UFZ developed into a world-leading center for research and the conceptualization of approaches to dealing with landscapes degraded by heavy industry. Concepts were developed for the residual pits from open-cast mining and for contaminated industrial land.

From the turn of the millennium, the research spectrum was expanded beyond the scope of legacy environmental contamination. It was broadened to include global issues such as the preservation of biodiversity, sustainable water management, and the study of environmental chemicals.

A distinctive feature is the interdisciplinary approach: it has been possible to bring the natural sciences, engineering, and the social sciences together under one roof. UFZ is labeling that cooperation as "integrated environmental research."

The UFZ has been operating KUBUS, a modern communications and event venue in Leipzig, since 2004. KUBUS is designed to have flexible event spaces in a range of sizes and accommodates up to 550 people.

== Academic excellence in research and teaching ==
As an international centre for environmental sciences, the UFZ investigates interrelationships between humans and nature under the influence of global change. The research of UFZ scientists focus on the terrestrial environment with a focus on the condition in middel europe: a mixture of densely populated urban and industrial conurbations, agricultural landscapes and near-natural landscapes. They examine issues relating to future land use, the preservation of biological diversity and of ecosystem services, the sustainable management of soil and water resources and the effect of chemicals on humans and the environment on different scales.

=== Research ===
Marine pollution poses a major threat to the northern gannets (Morus bassanus) that breed on the North Sea island of Heligoland. As part of the "P-LEACH" project, the UFZ, the Helmholtz-Zentrum Hereon in Geesthacht, GEOMAR Kiel, and the Alfred Wegener Institute in Bremerhaven are analyzing the chemical components of plastic waste found in oceans and rivers. They aim to determine how the sun's UV radiation contributes to the release of chemical substances from these plastics.

The work of the UFZ is characterised by integrated environmental research that overcomes disciplinary boundaries between the natural and social sciences (interdisciplinarity) and brings together decision-makers from business, government and society (transdisciplinarity). Major scientific infrastructures such as climate and land-use experiments (e.g., GCEF Global Change Experimental Facility, ProVis Centre for the visualisation of biochemical processes at cellular level), platforms and technologies for environmental monitoring (e.g. TERENO terrestrial environmental observatories), modelling and visualisation (e.g., TESSIN/VisLab Terrestrial Environmental System Simulation & Integration Network) have been or are being initiated, developed and used as part of cooperation arrangements and networks at national and international level.

The goal of UFZ research is to identify ways in which fundamental natural resources can be used sustainably for the well-being of humans and the environment.

=== Teaching ===
Although the UFZ is a non-university research institution, it is closely and systematically integrated into university-level teaching and the development of early-career researchers. Historically and geographically, its strongest ties are with the University of Leipzig, the Martin Luther University of Halle-Wittenberg, and the Friedrich Schiller University of Jena. Most of the research group leaders hold professorships at one of these universities.

For PhD candidates, the UFZ has a dedicated platform called HIGRADE (Helmholtz Interdisciplinary Graduate School for Environmental Research). In addition to pursuing their doctorate at an external university, candidates at the UFZ receive structured, interdisciplinary supplementary training, financial support, and sound research conditions.

== Structure ==
The topic areas have been developed by the UFZ in response to challenges facing society in times of global change: climate change, land-use change, population growth, societies working under conditions of scarcity, globalization, urbanisation, decline in biodiversity, rising energy and food demands, rising quantity and variety of chemicals impacting people and the environment, new patterns in national and global governance.

A total of 37 method-oriented departments are assigned to the six strategic topic areas. The large number of departments shows the wide subject range and diversity of research at the UFZ.

=== Departements ===
The integrated environmental research is organized into six thematic areas. Thematic areas 1–4 are core topics, while thematic areas 5 and 6 represent cross-cutting competencies:

1. Ecosystems of the Future
2. Water Resources and the Environment
3. Chemicals in the Environment
4. Sustainable Technologies for the Environment
5. Smart Models and Monitoring
6. Environment and Society
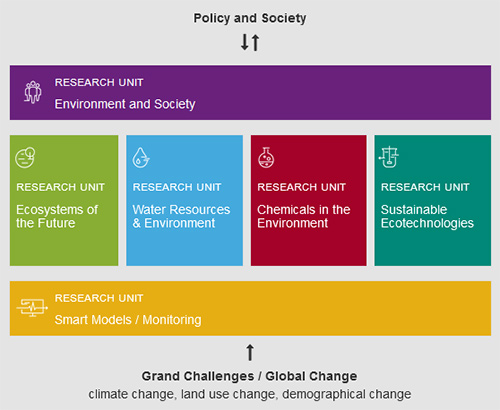
7.

=== Personal ===
The UFZ employs a total of more than 1,200 employees (as of October 2026).

Notable schoolar woriking at UFZ are:

- François Buscot (soilecology)
- Beate Escher (cyto-toxicology)
- Katrin Böhning-Gaese (onithology, UFZ-director)
- Ingolf Kühn (macro-ecology)
- Stan W. Harpole (Physiological ecology)
- Dagmar Haase (urban ecology)
- Josef Settele (Conservation research & socio-ecological systems)
- Tesfaye Weubet (environmental genomics & microbial ecology)
- Christian Wissel (ecological modelling)
- Jakob Zscheischler (climate change and extreme weather events)

== Networks ==
The UFZ is a member of the Helmholtz Association of German Research Centres. The UFZ carries out its research in one of six research fields of the Helmholtz Association: Earth and Environment.

The UFZ cooperates and works with a large number of government agencies, research facilities and organisations at a national and international level (including UNEP, EU, Intergovernmental Panel on Climate Change (IPCC), Intergovernmental Science-Policy Platform on Biodiversity and Ecosystem Services (IPBES), the Umweltbundesamt (UBA), the Federal Institute for Risk Assessment (BfR), and the Federal Agency for Nature Conservation (BfN)).

UFZ is a member of PEER (Partnership for European Environmental Research). PEER is a network of eight European environmental research centres, and was established in 2001. By carrying out joint research projects and fostering cooperation between European and international researchers, PEER aims to contribute to the strengthening of environmental research and its role at the European level.

The UFZ, together with the universities of Leipzig, Halle-Wittenberg and Jena and other research facilities, is a cooperation partner of the German Centre for Integrative Biodiversity Research (iDiv), which was established in 2012. iDiv is based in Leipzig and is funded by the Deutsche Forschungsgemeinschaft (DFG, German Research Foundation).

The UFZ has been accredited under EMAS (Eco-Management and Audit System) since 2005. It has been certified under the "berufundfamilie" (job and family) audit since 2014.

== Funding ==
The basic funding for the UFZ is provided by the Federal Republic of Germany (90%) and the Federal States of Saxony and Saxony-Anhalt (5% each) to a total of about €85 million. The total budget including third-party funds and other income is about € 135 million (as of December 2025).

== Publications ==
The UFZ publishes a series of brochures, research papers and other publications. An annual report on the work of the Centre is published each year. An overview of publications can be found on the UFZ website.
