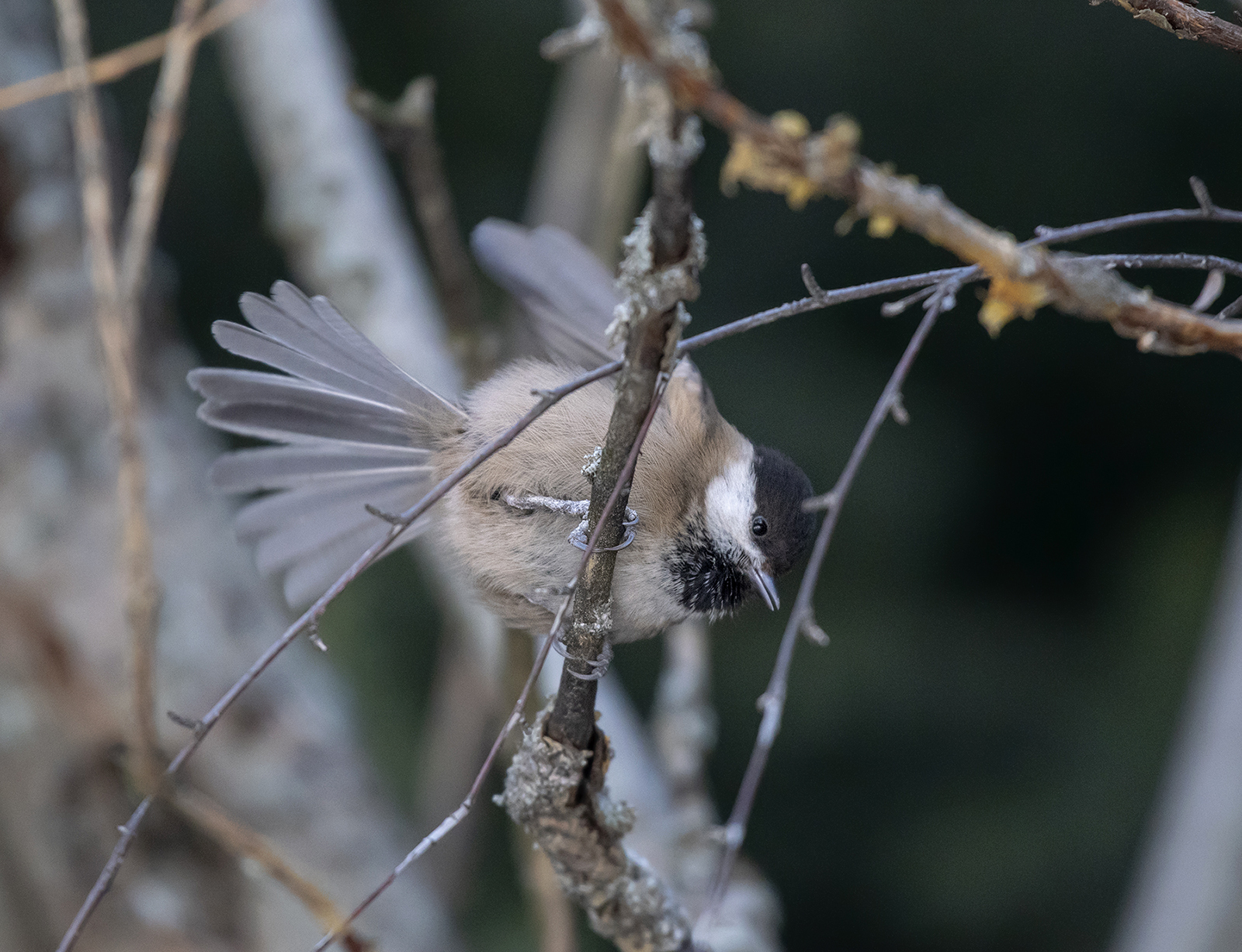

Scientific classification
- Kingdom: Animalia
- Phylum: Chordata
- Class: Aves
- Order: Passeriformes
- Family: Paridae
- Genus: Poecile
- Species: P. montanus
- Subspecies: P. m. songarus

Trinomial name
- Poecile montanus songarus (Severtzov, 1873)

Synonyms
- Poecile songarus Parus songarus

= Songar tit =

Subspecies of bird

The Songar tit (Poecile montanus songarus) is a passerine bird in the tit family. It is the southern counterpart of the willow tit (P. montanus), and is usually included in it as a subspecies.

It breeds in the deciduous mountain forests of southeast Kazakhstan, Kyrgyzstan and northern China.

The 13 cm long Songar tit has a dark brown cap, blackish bib, rich brown upperparts, white cheeks and cinnamon buff underparts. The sexes are similar, but juveniles are somewhat duller.

The most common call is a nasal zee, zee, zee, but the notes of the bird evidently vary considerably

The Songar tit usually excavates its own nesting hole, often in a rotten stump or in a tree, more or less decayed. Most nests examined are cups of felted material, such as fur, hair and wood chips, but feathers are sometimes used. The number of eggs is from five to six, white with small reddish spots or blotches.

They feed on caterpillars, insects and seeds, much like other tits.
