= Wildlife trust =

The term wildlife trust can be used in one of two senses to describe organisations concerned with wildlife:

- in a specific sense, to refer to the Royal Society of Wildlife Trusts in the United Kingdom, or one of its constituent members known as The Wildlife Trusts; a list of these can be found at that page.
- in a more generic sense to refer to a charitable organisation whose aims relate to wildlife (usually wildlife conservation, but also education); a (very incomplete) list of these is below.

Wildlife trusts (other than those that are part of the UK movement The Wildlife Trusts):

- EcoHealth Alliance, formerly called Wildlife Trust, a US-based organisation
- Endangered Wildlife Trust
- The Irish Wildlife Trust
- The Vincent Wildlife Trust
- The David Sheldrick Wildlife Trust
- Wildlife Trust of India
- Okavango People's Wildlife Trust
- Earth Trust
