= Atlas of the British Flora =

- First edition
- Author: Franklyn Perring and S. Max Walters
- Language: English
- Publisher: Botanical Society of the British Isles
- Publication date: 1962
- Publication place: United Kingdom
- Media type: Print
- ISBN: 0-901158-19-4 (3rd edition)
- OCLC: 28734311

The Atlas of the British Flora is a book by Franklyn Perring and S. Max Walters, published by the Botanical Society of the British Isles.

It was first published in 1962, with a second edition published in 1976, and a third in 1982.

The atlas contains 10-km square distribution maps for all non-critical native and frequently occurring alien vascular plant species found in Britain and Ireland.

== Importance ==
The 1962 Atlas was a groundbreaking publication that revolutionized the study of natural history by introducing a scientific approach to observation. This approach, which was initially developed for national purposes, has since been adopted on an international scale and is now widely used in biological recording programs. In recent decades, advances in technology such as affordable personal computers, civilian GPS, and the internet have greatly enhanced the ability to record and share biological records. This has led to a significant increase in the accuracy and precision of these records, as well as the speed with which they can be shared online. As a result, the volume of available records has increased tenfold and they are now routinely used for research, conservation, and public policy purposes.

Over the past 50 years, rapid industrialization and urbanization have led to significant environmental changes, with plants often bearing the brunt of these changes in intensively managed landscapes. Even in remote areas, the effects of air pollution and climate change are becoming increasingly evident. The 1962 Atlas is one of the few existing biological baselines that can be used to measure these changes, and it has played a critical role in documenting and understanding the main drivers of change. While research into these processes is still in its early stages, the increase in data quality and improvements in data analysis methods have made it possible to produce more accurate and powerful results.

== Bibliography ==
- Braithwaite, Michael; Walker, Kevin (2012). 50 years of mapping the British and Irish flora 1962-2012 (PDF). London: Botanical Society of the British Isles. ISBN 9780901158468.
- Perring, Franklyn; Walters, Stuart Max (1962). Atlas of the British flora. Botanical Society of the British Isles. ISBN 9780715811993.
