= Monks Wood =

Nature reserve in Sawtry, Cambridgeshire, England

Monks Wood and The Odd Quarter
- Site of Special Scientific Interest
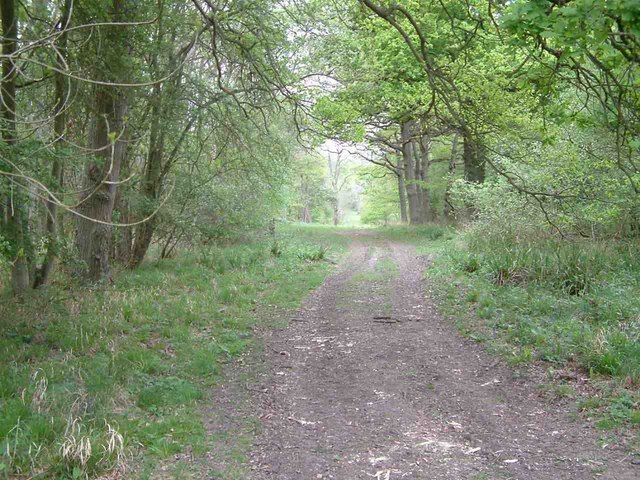

- Location within Cambridgeshire
- Location of Monks Wood and The Odd Quarter.
- Area of search: Cambridgeshire
- Grid reference: TL 196 801
- Coordinates: 52.406°N 0.243°W
- Interest: Biological
- Area: 169.3 hectares (418 acres)
- Notification date: 1986
- Location map: Magic Map

Monks Wood is a 157-hectare (390-acre) National Nature Reserve north-west of Huntingdon in Cambridgeshire, and a Nature Conservation Review site, Grade I. A slightly more extensive area of 169.3 hectares (418 acres) is the Monks Wood and The Odd Quarter biological Site of Special Scientific Interest.

The site is described by Natural England as one of Britain's most essential lowland woods. It is mainly of the wet ash-maple type, with a creamy shrub layer that was formerly coppiced. Trees include the rare wild service tree, particularly in The Odd Quarter. There is ground flora typical of ancient woodland, together with woodland rides, ponds, streams, and herb-rich grassland.

Monks Wood was the site of an experimental biological research station of The Nature Conservancy from 1961 to 2009. The marsh tits in the wood have been the subject of several studies. Beginning in 1961, a 4-hectare (9.9-acre) former barley field next to the station was allowed to naturally regenerate as a rewilding experiment.

There is access to Monks Wood from the road, which runs along its southern boundary. The Odd Quarter is private property with no public access.

== See also ==
- Biological Records Centre
