= Nature Conservancy (United Kingdom) =

The Nature Conservancy was a British government agency established in 1949 under the National Parks and Access to the Countryside Act 1949, drafted in part by Max Nicholson. It was a research council for natural sciences and 'biological service'. This provided legal protection of national nature reserves and Sites of Special Scientific Interest (SSSI).

The first Director General was Captain Cyril Diver. In 1952 Max Nicholson took over as Director General and served until 1966. During this time Nature Conservancy developed, despite opposition from vested interests, as a research and management body which promoted ecology as having broad relevance and application to land use decision-making and management. This included helping to establish the Monks Wood Experimental Station, which was perhaps the first to examine the effect of pesticides on the environment.

In 1966 it was incorporated in to the newly created Natural Environment Research Council (NERC). The Nature Conservancy was separated from the NERC in 1973 and became the Nature Conservancy Council.
