= Botanical Society of Britain and Ireland =

Learned society

- Predecessor: Botanical Society of London
- Formation: 1836
- Type: Registered Charity
- Location: Head office in Durham
- Region served: UK
- Members: 2,774 (2017)
- Revenue: £1,410,384 (2018)
- Volunteers: 350+
- Website: https://bsbi.org

The Botanical Society of Britain and Ireland (BSBI) is a scientific society for the study of flora, plant distribution and taxonomy relating to Great Britain, Ireland, the Channel Islands and the Isle of Man. The society was founded as the Botanical Society of London in 1836, and became the Botanical Society of the British Isles, eventually changing to its current name in 2013. It includes both professional and amateur members and is the largest organisation devoted to botany in Britain and Ireland. Its history is recounted in David Allen's book The Botanists.

The society publishes handbooks and journals, conducts national surveys and training events, and hosts conferences. It also awards grants and bursaries, sets professional standards (with Field Identification Skills Certificates (FISCs)), and works in an advisory capacity for governments and NGOs.

The society is managed by a council of elected members, and is a Registered Charity in England & Wales (212560) and Scotland (SC038675).

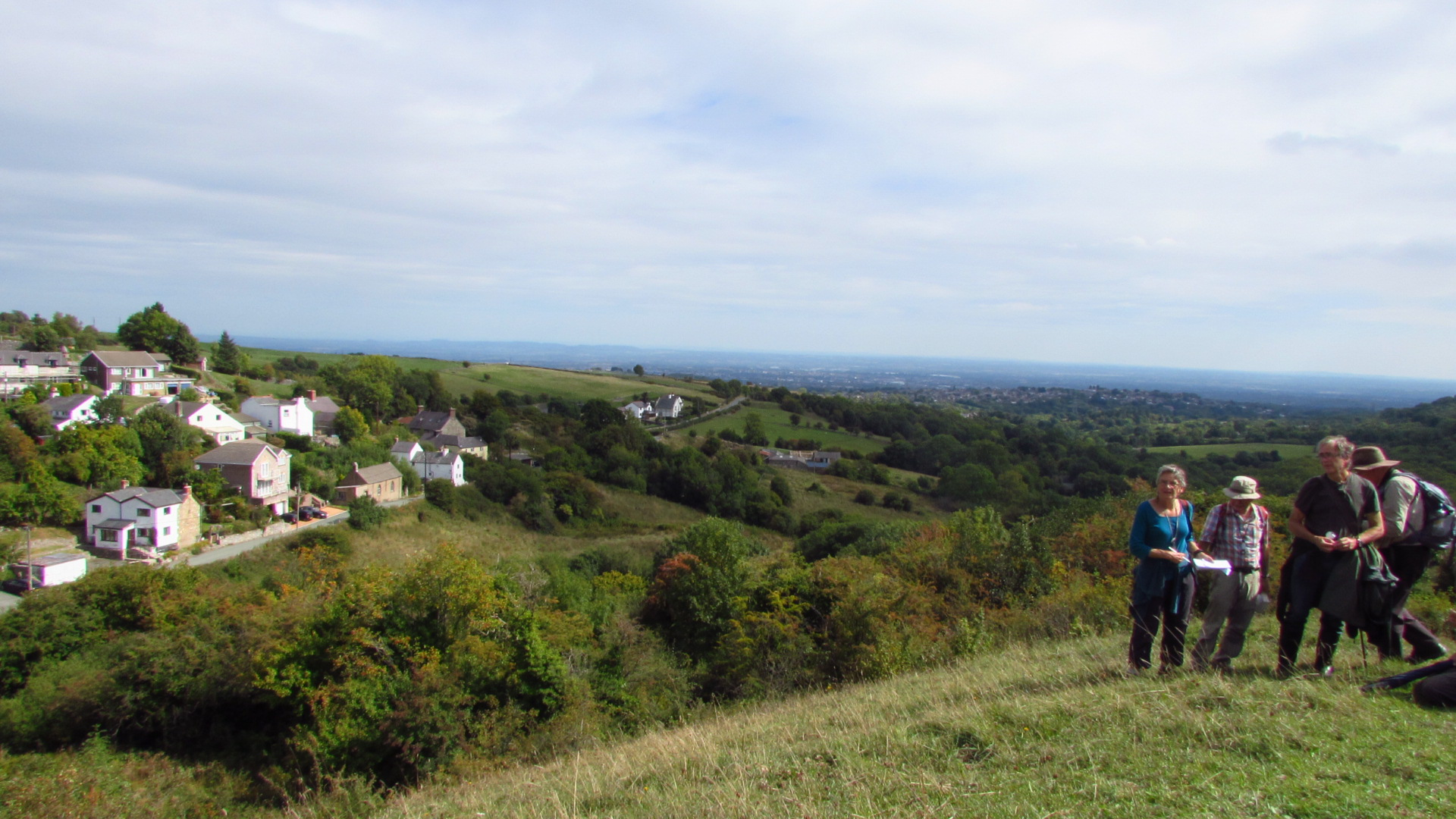
BSBI VC51 surveying Minera Mountain

== Publications ==
The BSBI has produced three atlases covering the distribution of vascular plants in British Isles. The third atlas, Atlas 2020, was published in March 2023.

It publishes a newsletter, BSBI News (ISSN 0309-930X), that is distributed to members three times a year and is available online.

The BSBI published a scientific periodical, New Journal of Botany (formerly Watsonia), that was discontinued in 2017. The journal had a north-western European scope covering vascular plants, their taxonomy, biosystematics, ecology, distribution and conservation, as well as topics of a more general or historical nature". This has been replaced by an online journal, British and Irish Botany.

The society produced the Atlas of the British Flora in 2002, the Vice-county Census Catalogue of the Vascular Plants of Great Britain in 2003, and publishes the BSBI Handbooks series.

=== Handbook series ===
The following Handbooks have been produced, with more promised for the future.

1. Sedges. (3rd edition) 2007. A.C. Jermy, D.A. Simpson, M.J.Y. Foley & M.S. Porter
2. Umbellifers. 1980. T.G. Tutin
3. Docks and Knotweeds. 1981. J.E. Lousley & D.H. Kent
4. Willows and Poplars. 1984. R.D. Meikle
5. Charophytes. 1986. J.A. Moore
6. Crucifers. 1991. T.C.G. Rich
7. Roses. 1993. G.G. Graham & A.L. Primavesi
8. Pondweeds. 1995. C.D. Preston
9. Dandelions. 1997. A.A. Dudman & A.J. Richards
10. Sea Beans & Nickar Nuts. 2000. E.C. Nelson
11. Water-starworts of Europe. 2008. R.V. Lansdown
12. Fumitories. 2009. R.J. Murphy
13. Grasses. 2009. T. Cope & A. Gray
14. Whitebeams, Rowans and Service Trees. 2010. T.C.G. Rich, L. Houston, A. Robertson & M.C.F. Proctor.
15. British Northern Hawkweeds. 2011. T.C.G. Rich & W. Scott.
16. Evening-primroses. 2016. R.J. Murphy.
17. Violas. 2017. M. Porter & M. Foley.
18. Eyebrights. 2018. C. Metherell & F. Rumsey.
19. Gentians of Britain and Ireland. 2019. Tim Rich & Andy McVeigh.
20. Hawkweeds of South-East England. 2020. Mike Shaw.
21. Monograph of British and Irish Hieracium section Foliosa and section Prenanthoidea. 2021. Tim Rich and David McCosh.
22. Broomrapes of Britain and Ireland. 2021. Chris Thorogood & Fred Rumsey.
23. Field Handbook to British and Irish Dandelions. 2021. A.J. Richards.
24. Alchemilla: Lady's Mantles of Britain and Ireland. 2022. Mark Lynes.
25. Brambles of Scotland. 2025. A. Hannah.
26. Wild roses of Great Britain and Ireland. 2025. Roger Maskew and Gareth Knass.

=== Publications dealing with rare plants ===
The BSBI's attitudes to publication of details of locations of rare plants have changed over time. In 1991, it publicly criticised the author John Fisher, for writing "A Colour Guide to Rare Wild Flowers", a book which gave details of the locations of a selection of rare plants, stating that it was not in the interests of conservation. Following this criticism, Fisher resigned his membership of the BSBI. Fourteen years later, David Pearman, the Society's General Secretary, contrasted the way in which Fisher was, as Pearman termed it, "hounded out", with the more open attitudes that had then taken hold. In more recent times, the BSBI has produced or supported the production of a number of County Rare Plant Registers, books which list all known locations for all rare plants in their county of coverage.

== Bibliography ==
- Perring, Franklyn; Walters, Stuart Max (1962). Atlas of the British flora. Botanical Society of the British Isles. ISBN 9780715811993.
